= Tokyo Metropolitan Art Museum =

Museum in Tokyo, Japan

Tokyo Metropolitan Museum
- Established: 1926
- Location: Tokyo, Japan
- Coordinates: 35.7172°N 139.7729°E
- Type: Art museum
- Collection size: 49 objects
- Architect: Kunio Maekawa
- Public transit access: Ueno Station (with JR East and Tokyo Metro); Uguisudani Station (with JR East); Keisei Ueno Station (with Keisei Electric Railway)
- Website: www.tobikan.jp/en/index.html

The Tokyo Metropolitan Art Museum (東京都美術館, Tōkyōto Bijutsukan) is a museum of art located in Ueno Park, Tokyo, Japan. The first public art museum in Japan, it opened in 1926 as the Tokyo Prefectural Art Museum and was renamed in 1943 after Tokyo became a metropolitan prefecture. The original building was replaced by one built in 1975 designed by modernist architect Kunio Maekawa.

== History ==
In March 1921 Keitaro Sato, a coal magnate from Kyushu, donated one million yen to the prefectural government for a "permanent art museum" and on May 1, 1926, the Tokyo Prefectural Art Museum opened.

Upon its opening, the new institution was quickly lambasted by several art critics, including Shizuka Shikazaki who said it was a "complete failure" because it was planned as a permanent art museum and had no permanent collection; it was mainly used as a leased exhibition space to local art collectives. Two years later critic Seisui Sakai also wrote a critical review, stating that the museum would not truly be complete until it had established a permanent collection.

A new museum building was built in 1975. The original site was then demolished.

== Collection ==
The building, designed in 1975 by modernist architect Kunio Maekawa, was built with the surrounding green space of Ueno park in mind and has been praised by critics and visitors alike for an aesthetic that is avant-garde and harmonious with the park surrounding it.
