= Ueno Park =

Park in Tokyo, Japan

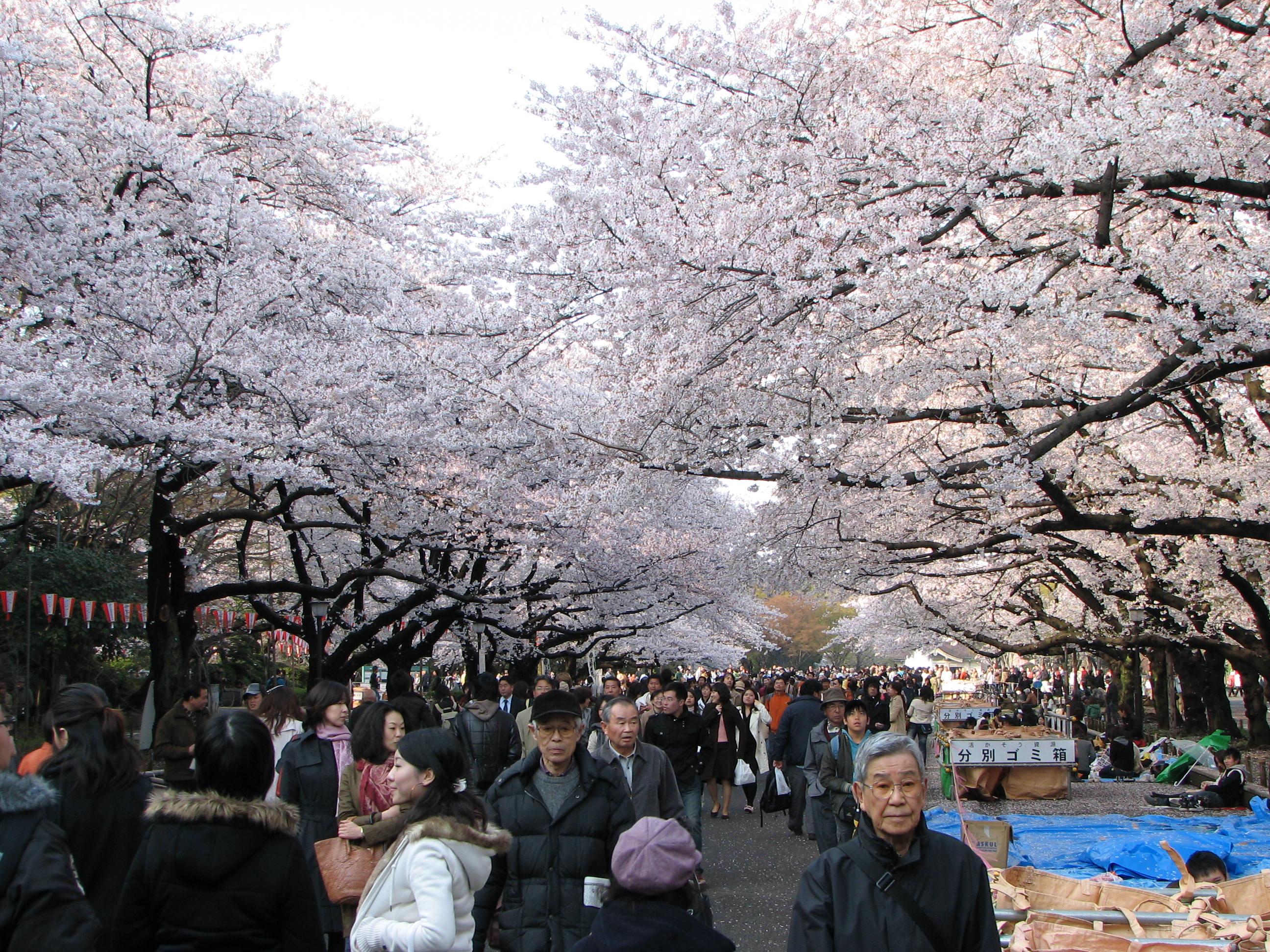
- Visitors enjoying the cherry blossoms
- Interactive map of Ueno Park
- Location: Taitō, Tokyo, Japan
- Coordinates: 35°42′44″N 139°46′16″E
- Area: 538,506.96 square metres (133.06797 acres)
- Created: 19 October 1873
- Public transit: Keisei-Ueno; Ueno; Okachimachi; Uguisudani; Ueno-hirokoji; Ueno-okachimachi; Naka-okachimachi; Yushima; Nezu

Ueno Park (上野公園, Ueno Kōen) is a spacious public park in the Ueno district of Taitō, Tokyo, Japan. The park was established in 1873 on lands formerly belonging to the temple of Kan'ei-ji. Amongst the country's first public parks, it was founded following the Western example as part of the borrowing and assimilation of international practices that characterizes the early Meiji period. The home of a number of major museums, Ueno Park is also celebrated in spring for its cherry blossoms and hanami. In recent times the park and its attractions have drawn over ten million visitors a year, making it Japan's most popular city park.

== History ==
Ueno Park occupies land once belonging to Kan'ei-ji, founded in 1625 in the "demon gate", the unlucky direction to the northeast of Edo Castle. Most of the temple buildings were destroyed in the Battle of Ueno in 1868 during the Boshin War, when the forces of the Tokugawa shogunate were defeated by those aiming at the restoration of imperial rule. In December of that year Ueno Hill became the property of the city of Tokyo, other than for the surviving temple buildings which include the five-story pagoda of 1639, the Kiyomizu Kannondō (or Shimizudō) of 1631, and approximately coeval main gate (all designated as Important Cultural Properties of Japan).

Various proposals were put forward for the use of the site as a medical school or hospital, but Dutch doctor Bauduin urged instead that the area be turned into a park. In January 1873 the Dajō-kan issued a notice providing for the establishment of public parks, noting that "in prefectures including Tokyo, Osaka, and Kyoto, there are places of historic interest, scenic beauty, and recreation and relaxation where people can visit and enjoy themselves, for example Sensō-ji and Kan'ei-ji..." This was the year after the foundation of Yellowstone, the world's first national park.

Later that year Ueno Park was established, alongside Shiba, Asakusa, Asukayama, and Fukugawa Parks. It was administered first by the Home Ministry's Museum Bureau, then by the Ministry of Agriculture and Commerce, before passing to the Ministry of the Imperial Household. In 1924, in honour of the marriage of Hirohito, Ueno Park was presented to the city by Emperor Taishō, receiving the official name that lasts to this day of Ueno Onshi Kōen (上野恩賜公園), lit. "Ueno Imperial Gift Park".

Following the end of World War II, Ueno Park became a prominent site of illegal drug trade and sex work, offered by cisgender panpan girls and assigned male at birth danshō (男娼) in women's clothes. Police Chief Eiichi Tanaka was at a forefront of fight with those, and led an intervention of a large group of policemen and politicians on Ueno Park on November 22, 1948. The intervention turned into a riot, with some of the danshō (including their leader Okiyo) beating and hitting Tanaka and the police. The public reaction was sympathetic to the sex workers resisting the widely maligned police, who would continue to crack down on the activity through the decades, eg. by closing the park after dark.

Several scenes in the park, 2026

== Natural features ==
The park has some 8,800 trees, including Ginkgo biloba, Cinnamomum camphora, Zelkova serrata, Formosan cherry, Somei-Yoshino cherry, and Japanese cherry. There is a further 24,800 m^{2} (267,000 sq ft) of shrubs. Shinobazu Pond is a small lake with an area of 16 ha (40 acres), extensive lotus beds, and marshland. It provides an important wintering ground for birds. Species commonly found include the tufted duck, Eurasian wigeon, northern pintail, common pochard, little grebe, great egret, and great cormorant. The Baer's pochard, ring-necked duck, and American wigeon have also been recorded.

The central island houses a shrine to Benzaiten, goddess of fortune, modelled on Chikubu Island in Lake Biwa. The area was once full of "rendezvous teahouses", equivalent of the modern love hotel. After the Pacific War the pond was drained and used for the cultivation of cereals and subsequently there were plans to turn the site into a baseball stadium or multi-story carpark. The lotus pond was restored in 1949, although much of it was again accidentally drained in 1968 during work on a new subway line.

In all there are some 800 cherry trees in the park, although with the inclusion of those belonging to the Ueno Tōshō-gū shrine, temple buildings, and other neighbouring points the total reaches some twelve hundred. Inspired, Matsuo Bashō wrote "cloud of blossoms - is the temple bell from Ueno or Asakusa".

== Cultural facilities ==
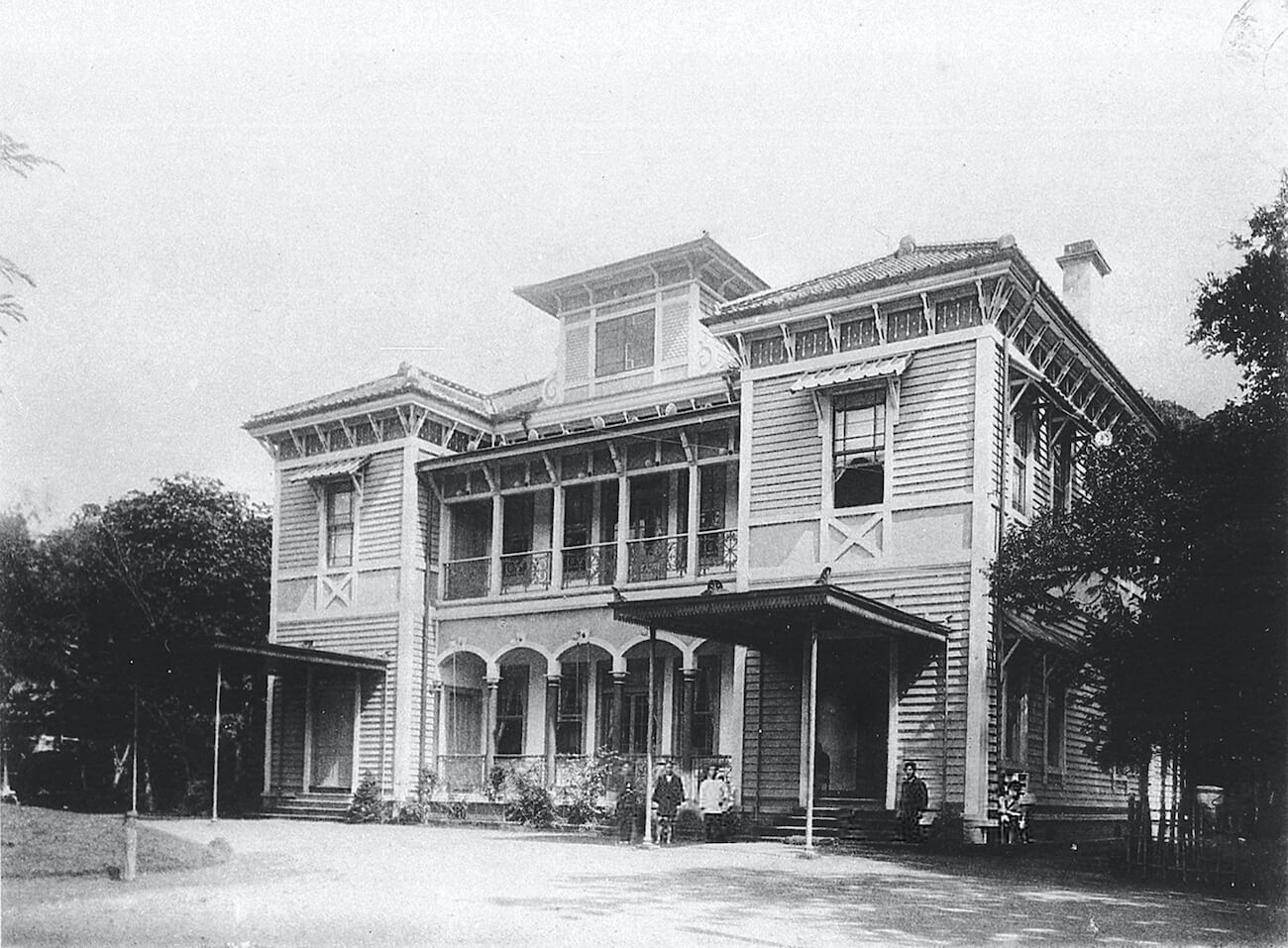
Seiyōken was founded in 1872, one of the first western-style restaurants in Japan; the first coffee house followed nearby in 1888.

Ueno Park is home to a number of museums. The very words in Japanese for museum as well as for art were coined in the Meiji period (from 1868) to capture Western concepts after the Iwakura Mission and other early visits to North America and Europe. The Tokyo National Museum was founded in 1872 after the first exhibition by the Museum Department of the new Ministry of Education. In the same year the Ministry of Education Museum opened, now the National Museum of Nature and Science.

The National Museum of Western Art was founded in 1959 based on the collection of the industrialist (Kawasaki group) Matsukata Kōjirō; the collection was left in storage in France by Matsukata and it was returned by the French government in 1959 after the Treaty of San Francisco. The building is by Le Corbusier who used it to express his concept of the Museum of Unlimited Growth, based on an expanding spiral. It has been inscribed on the UNESCO World Heritage List.

Other museums include the Tokyo Metropolitan Art Museum, dating back to 1926, and Shitamachi Museum of 1980, which is dedicated to the culture of the "Low City".

The park was also chosen as home for the Japan Academy (1879), Tokyo School of Fine Arts (1889), and Tokyo School of Music (1890).

The first western-style concert hall in the country, the Sōgakudō Concert Hall of 1890 (ICP) was donated to the ward in 1983 and reconstructed on another site in the park, where it is used for concerts. The Tokyo Bunka Kaikan opened in 1961 as a venue for opera and ballet, in celebration of the five hundredth anniversary of the foundation of the city of Edo.

The Imperial Library was established as the national library in 1872 and opened in Ueno Park in 1906; the National Diet Library opened in Chiyoda in 1948 and the building now houses the International Library of Children's Literature.

== Other landmarks ==
Tokugawa Ieyasu is enshrined at Ueno Tōshō-gū, dating to 1651.

Flame of Hiroshima and Nagasaki Memorial: On the right of the alley leading North to Tokugawa Ieyasu Tōshō-gū shrine is a grey stone memorial with a permanently burning flame in memory of the atomic bombings of Hiroshima and Nagasaki of August 1945 at the end of World War II. This Flame of Hiroshima and Nagasaki memorial was initiated in Hiroshima shortly after the nuclear bombings by Mr. Tatsuo Yamamoto (1916–2004), from the town of Hoshino. This flame was later merged with a flame started in Nagasaki. In 1968 members of the Tokyo's Shitamachi People Association put forward the idea of lighting the flame at the precinct of Tosho-gu shrine in Tokyo's Ueno Park. In April 1989, an "Association for the Flame of Hiroshima and Nagasaki Lit at Ueno Toshogu" was founded and tens of thousands of people took part in the fundraising for over one year. The construction of the monument was completed on July 21, 1990. The dedication carved into the memorial stone states that "We, hereby pledge to keep burning the A-bomb flame, convinced that this monument will contribute to strengthening the worldwide people's movement to abolish nuclear weapons and achieve peace, which is the most urgent task for the people across the borders".

Gojōten Jinja is dedicated to scholar Sugawara no Michizane, while neighbouring Hanazono Inari Jinja has red-bibbed Inari fox statues in an atmospheric grotto. There is a Yayoi-period burial mound on a small hill near the park's centre. For a decade until 1894 there was horse racing near Shinobazu Pond. Nowadays there is a baseball field, named in honour of poet Masaoka Shiki, fan of the sport. As well as the first art museum in Japan, the park had the first zoo, first tram, first May Day celebrations (in 1920), and staged a number of industrial expositions. Ueno Station opened nearby in 1883. After the Great Kantō earthquake in 1923, notices of missing persons were attached to the statue of Saigō Takamori. Ueno Park and its surroundings figure prominently in Japanese fiction, including The Wild Geese by Mori Ōgai.

One of the lanterns that is present at the park is a stone lantern that was one of two carved in 1651 to memorialize Tokugawa Iemitsu. Both lanterns stood at the park until the governor of Tokyo gifted one of them in 1954 to the city of Washington, D.C., to commemorate the 100th anniversary of Commodore Matthew C. Perry's signing of the 1854 Japan-US Treaty of Amity and Friendship. The lantern brought to Washington is known as the Japanese Lantern and currently resides in West Potomac Park among a number of cherry trees, the first of which were gifted by Tokyo mayor Yukio Ozaki in 1912. For over 50 years, the lighting of the lantern by the Embassy of Japan’s appointed Cherry Blossom Princess has opened the United States' annual National Cherry Blossom Festival.

== Education ==
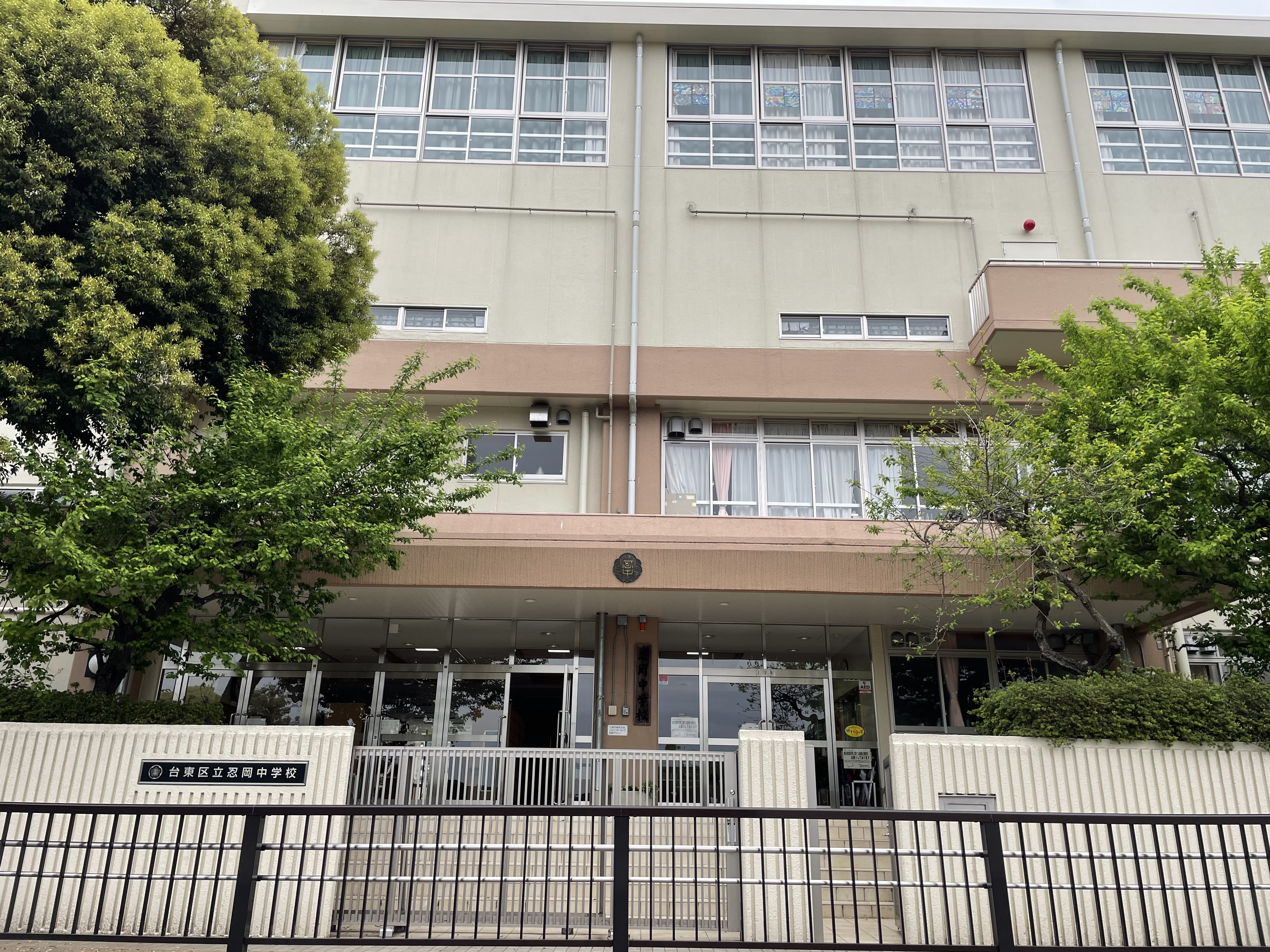
Shinobugaoka Junior High School (忍岡中学校) in Ueno Park

Taito City Board of Education operates public elementary and junior high schools.

Ueno Park 1-11-ban are zoned to Shinobugaoka Elementary School (忍岡小学校), while 12-18-ban are zoned to Negishi Elementary School (根岸小学校).

Part of Ueno Park (1-14 ban and parts of 15-17 ban) is zoned to Ueno Junior High School (上野中学校), while another part (18-ban and the rest of 15-17 ban) is zoned to Shinobugaoka Junior High School (忍岡中学校).

== Squatting ==
Many homeless people squat in Ueno Park. Found among the park's treelines and wooded areas, homeless camps border on the size of small villages, with an internal structure, culture, and support system. The long-term shelters are typically constructed of cardboard covered with blue tarps. The police occasionally tear down the camps and drive out or arrest the homeless, who return as soon as they can. While squatting is illegal in Japan, homelessness is seen as an endemic problem in Tokyo and other cities, and the presence of squatters is accepted as an inevitability.

== Access ==
- From the east (convenient access to the main park and most museums):
  - Ueno Station
- From the southeast (convenient access to the main park and Shinobazu Pond):
  - Keisei Ueno Station (located beneath the park)
  - Okachimachi Station
  - Ueno-hirokoji Station
  - Ueno-okachimachi Station
  - Naka-okachimachi Station
- From the southwest (convenient access to Shinobazu Pond):
  - Yushima Station
- From the northwest (convenient access to Shinobazu Pond and Ueno Zoo):
  - Nezu Station
- From the north (convenient access to the Tokyo National Museum):
  - Uguisudani Station

== Gallery of main attractions ==
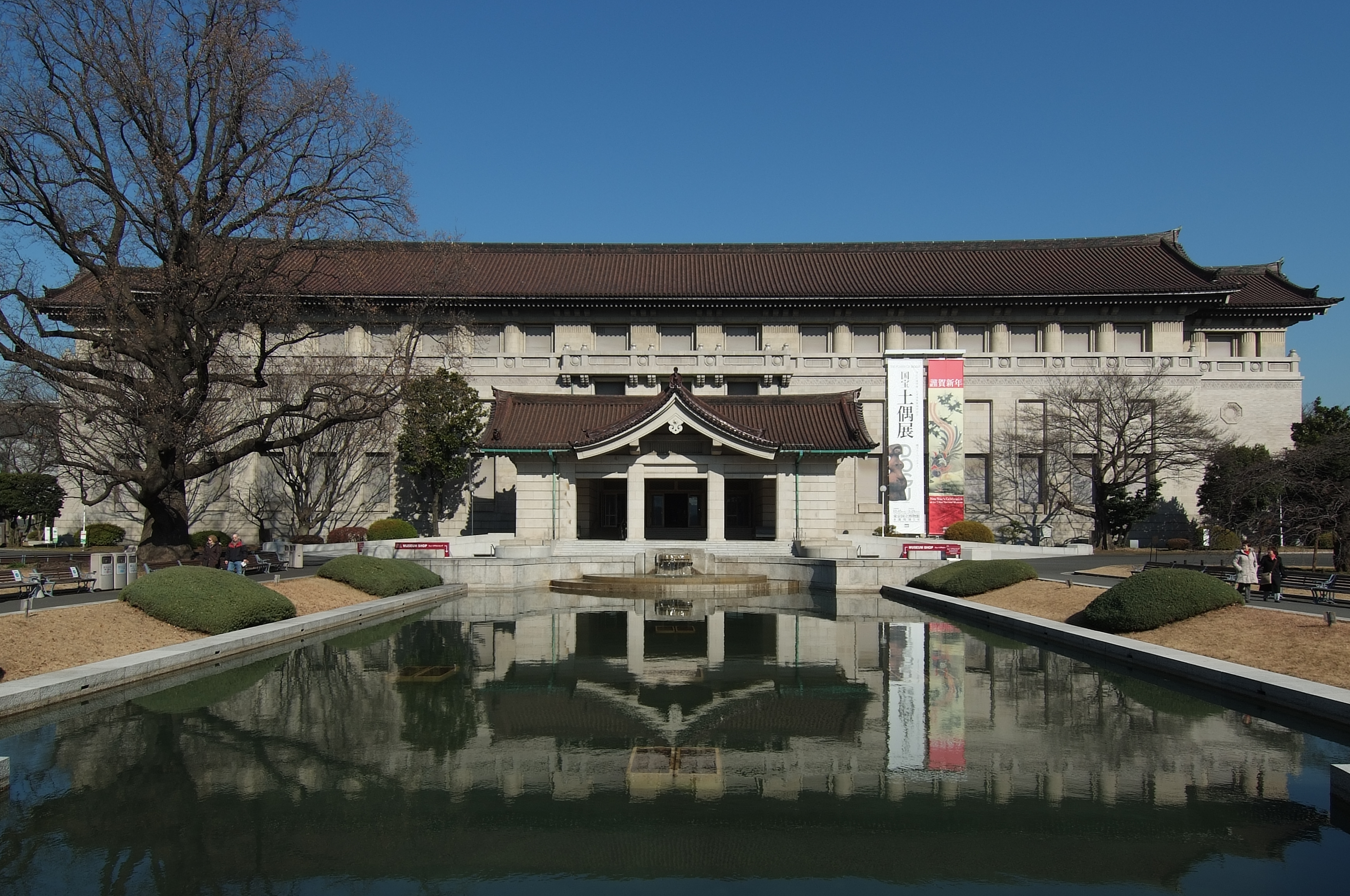
Tokyo National Museum

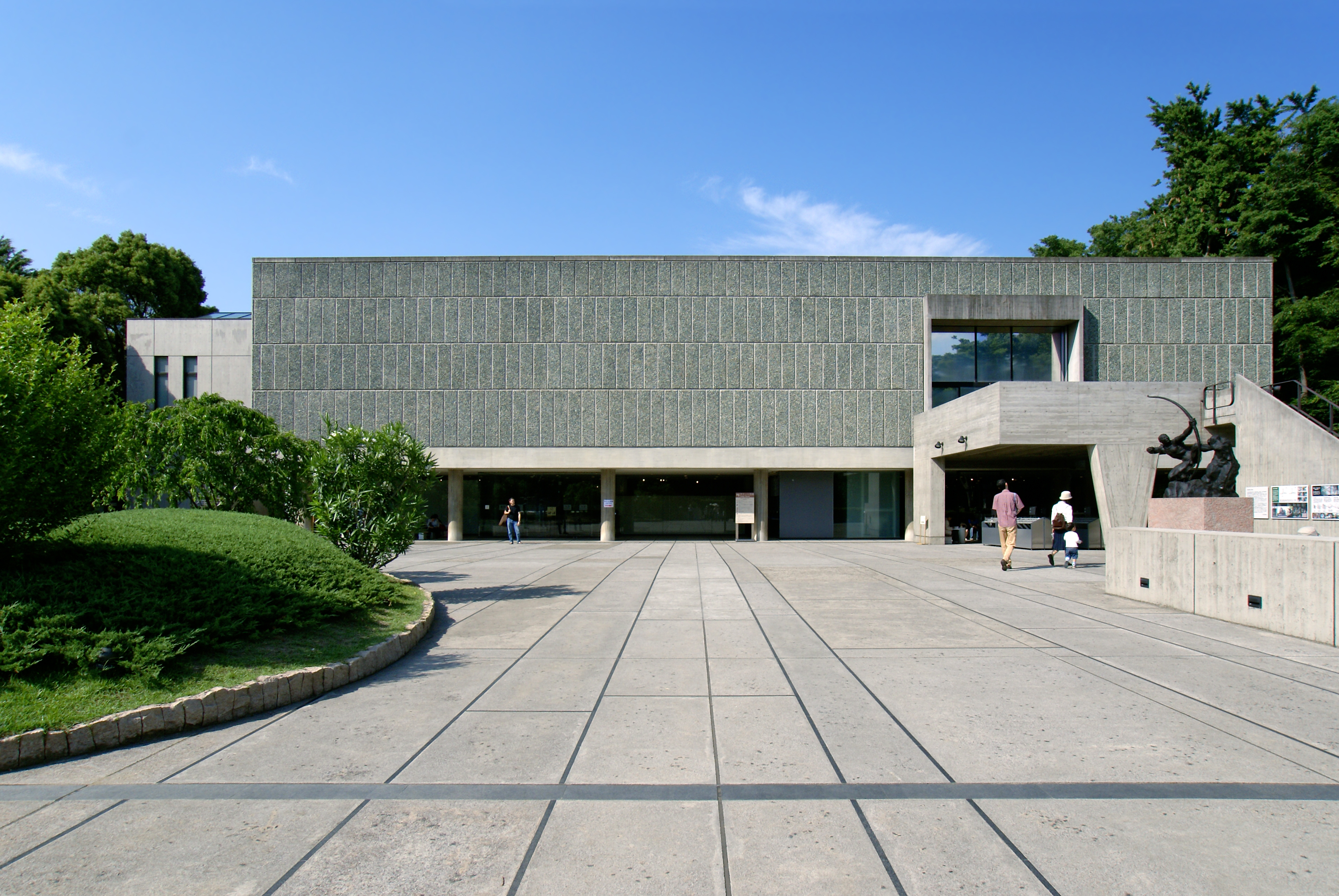
National Museum of Western Art

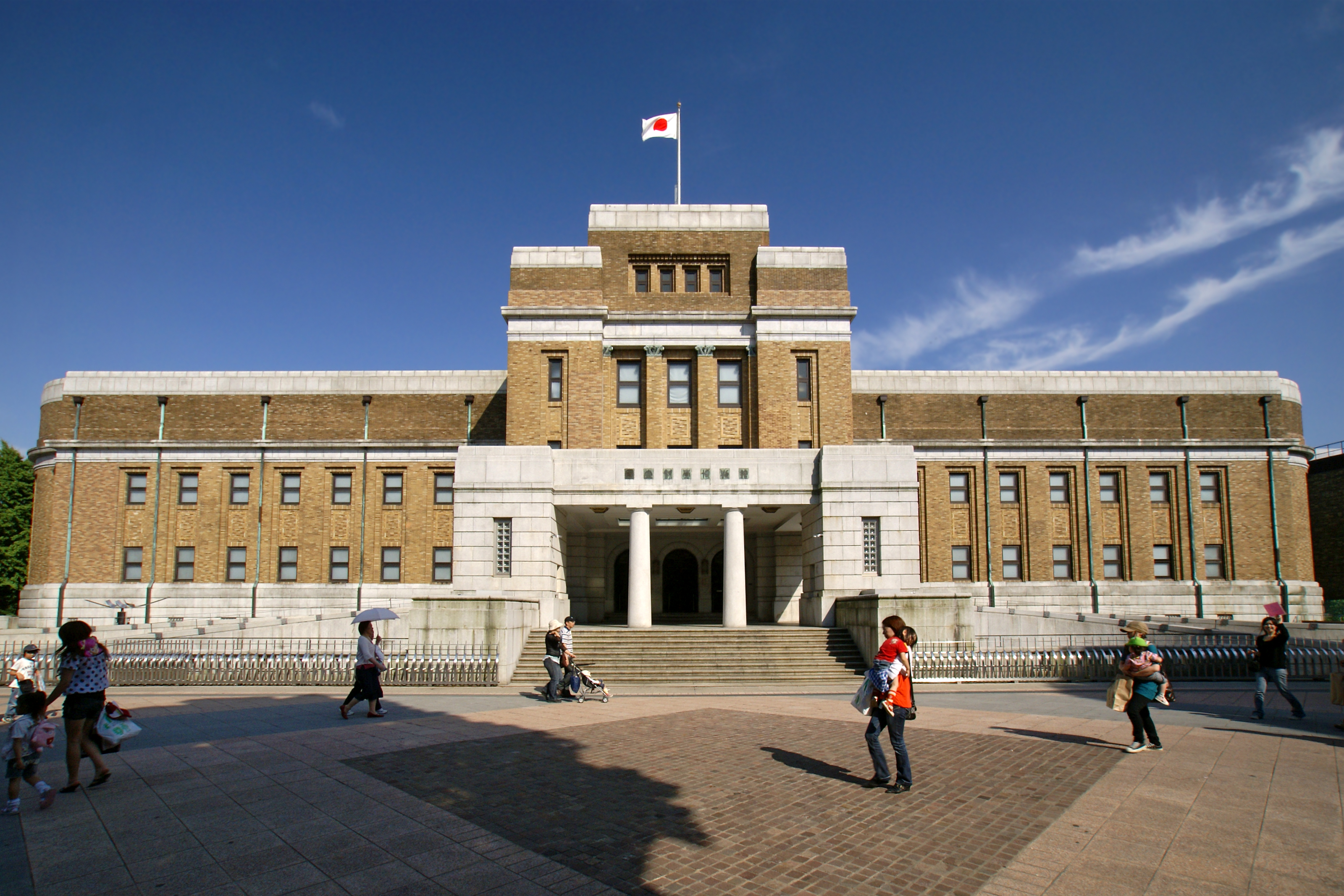
National Museum of Nature and Science

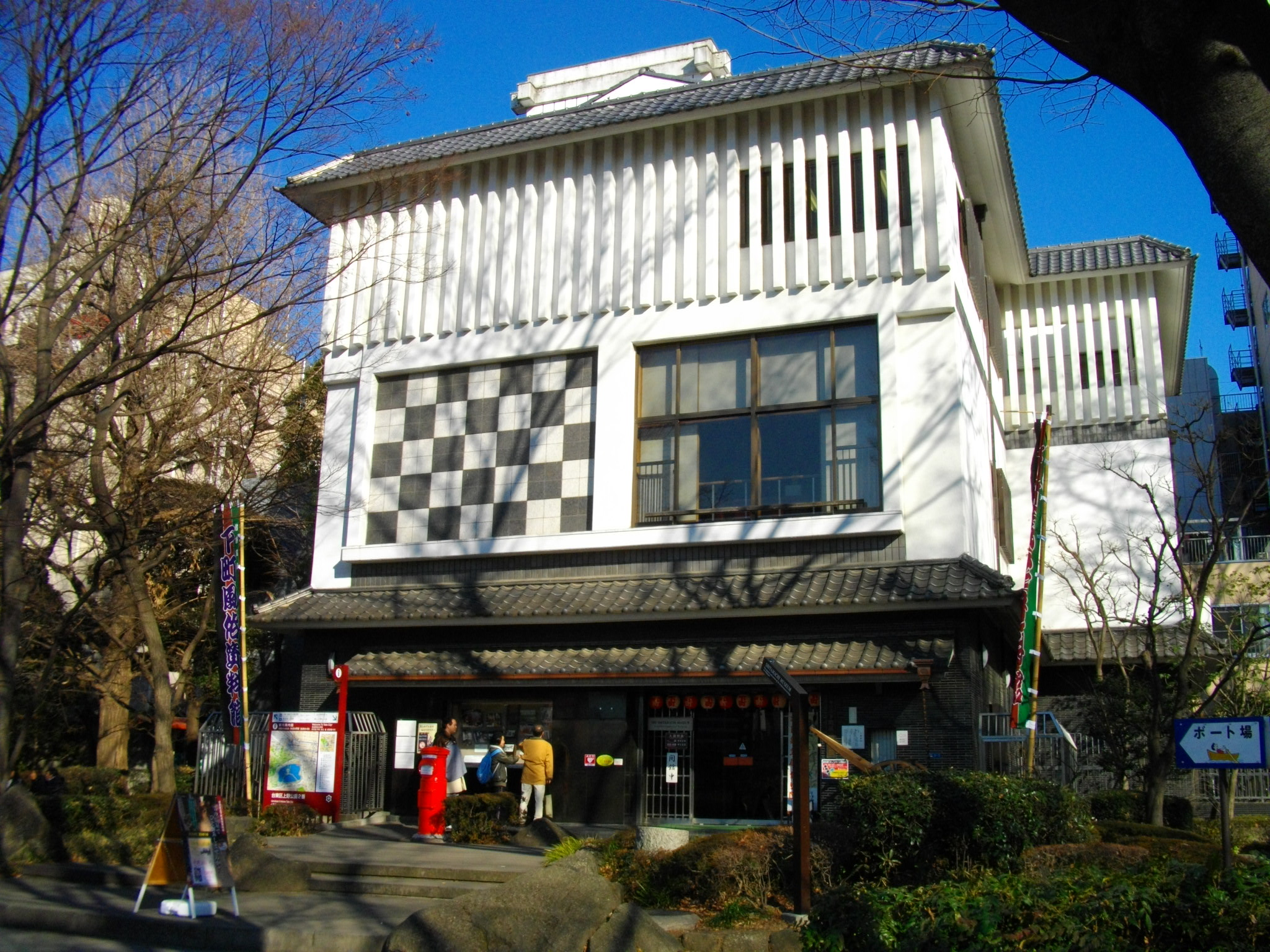
Shitamachi Museum

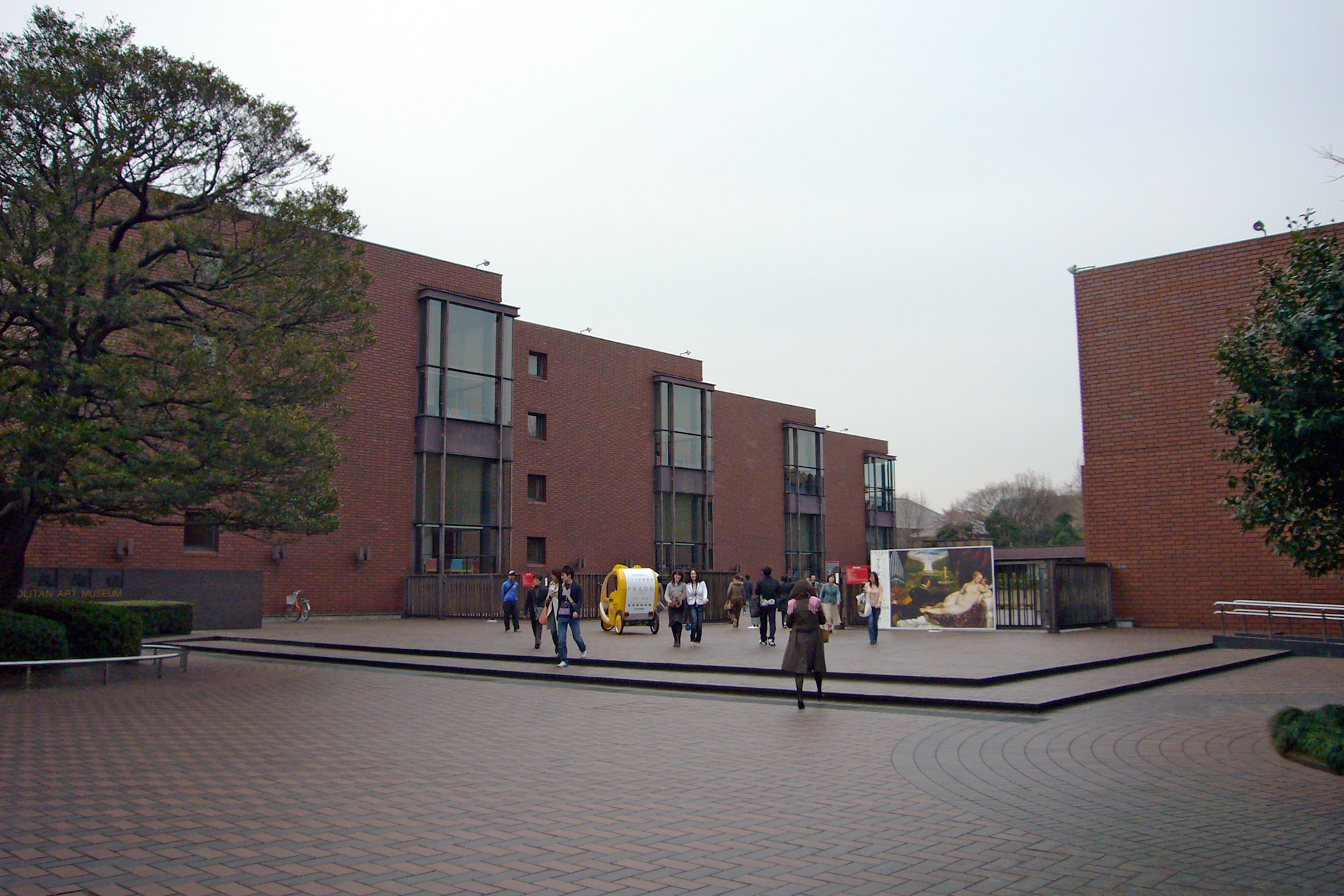
Tokyo Metropolitan Art Museum

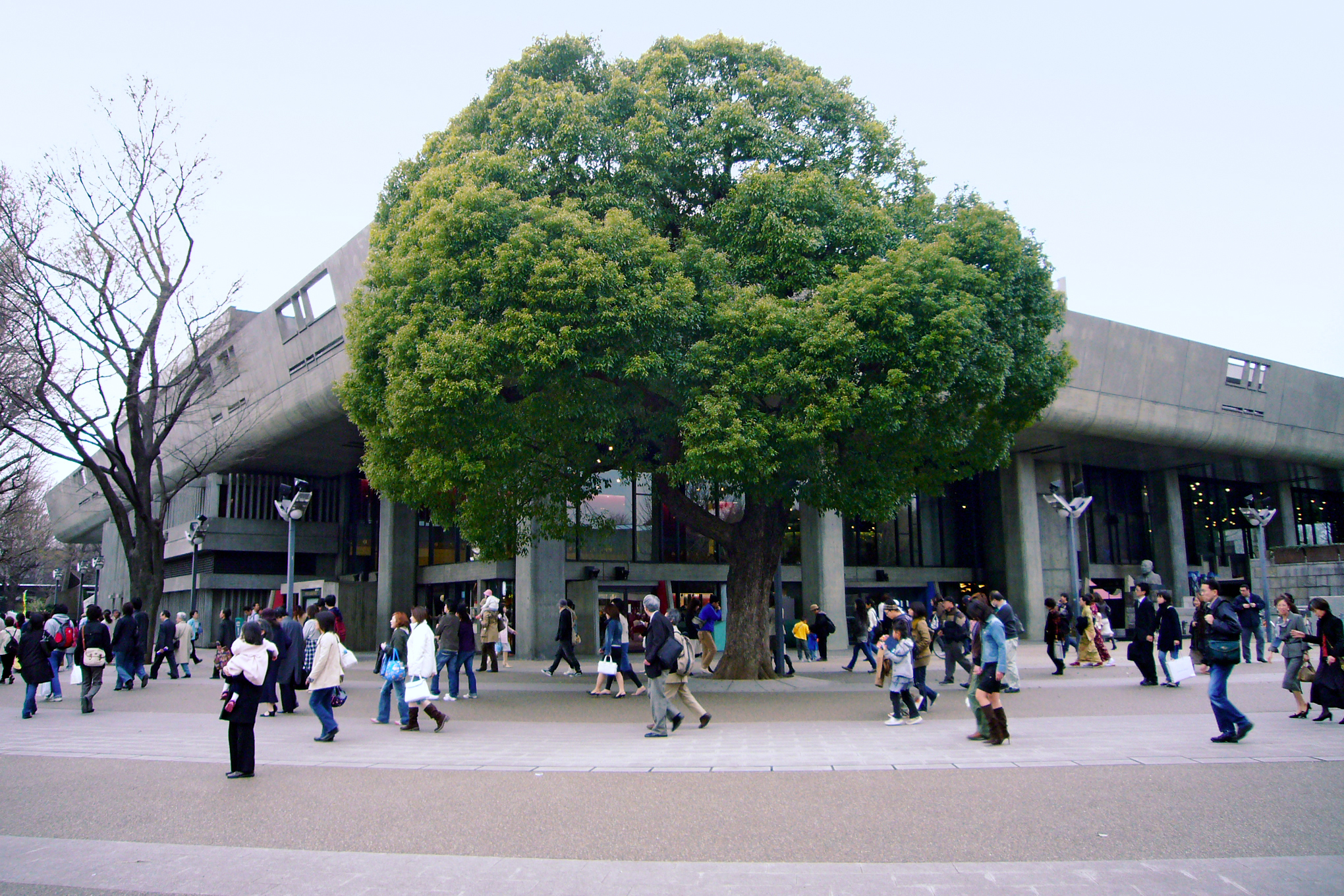
Tokyo Bunka Kaikan

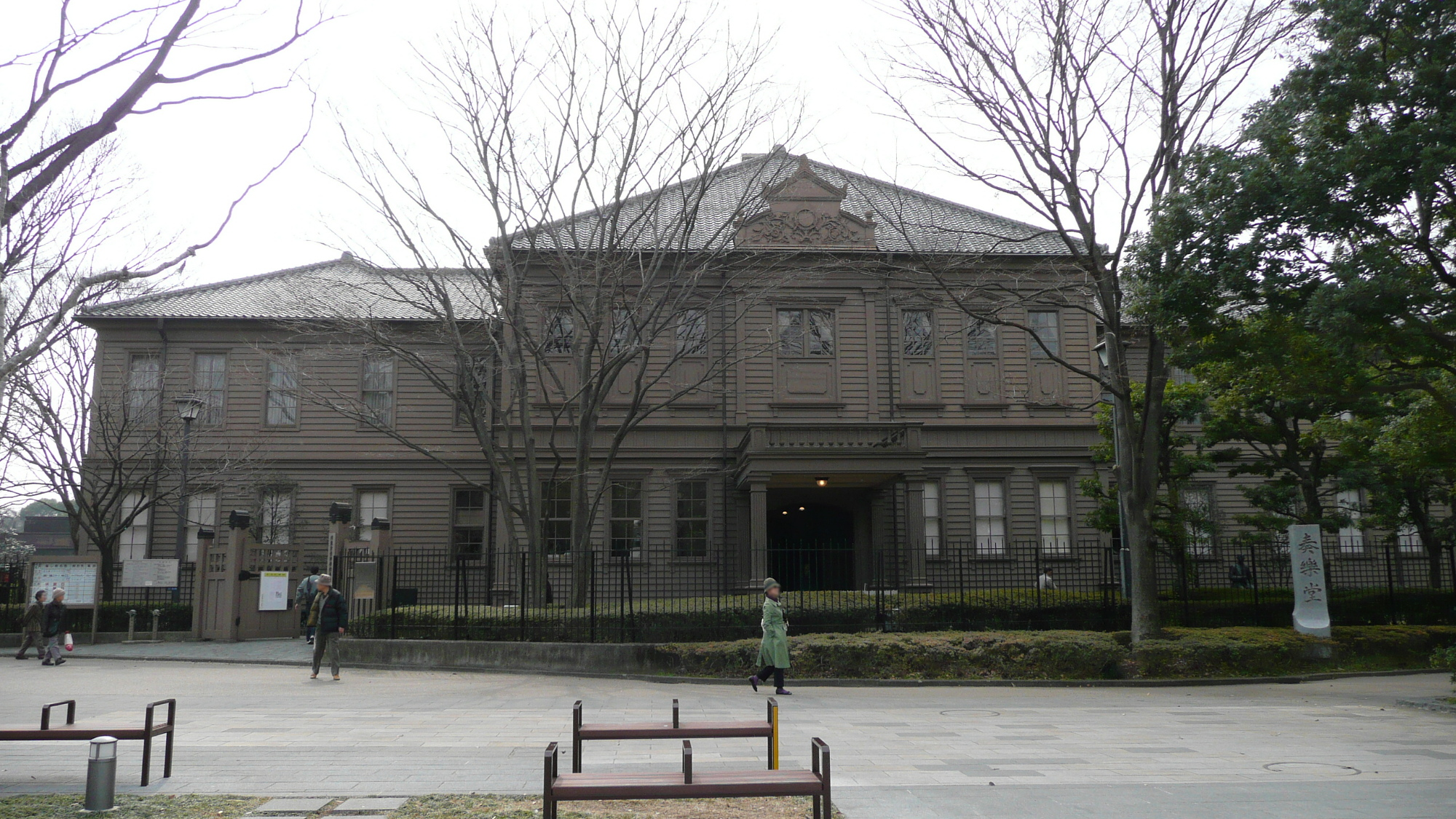
Sōgakudō Concert Hall

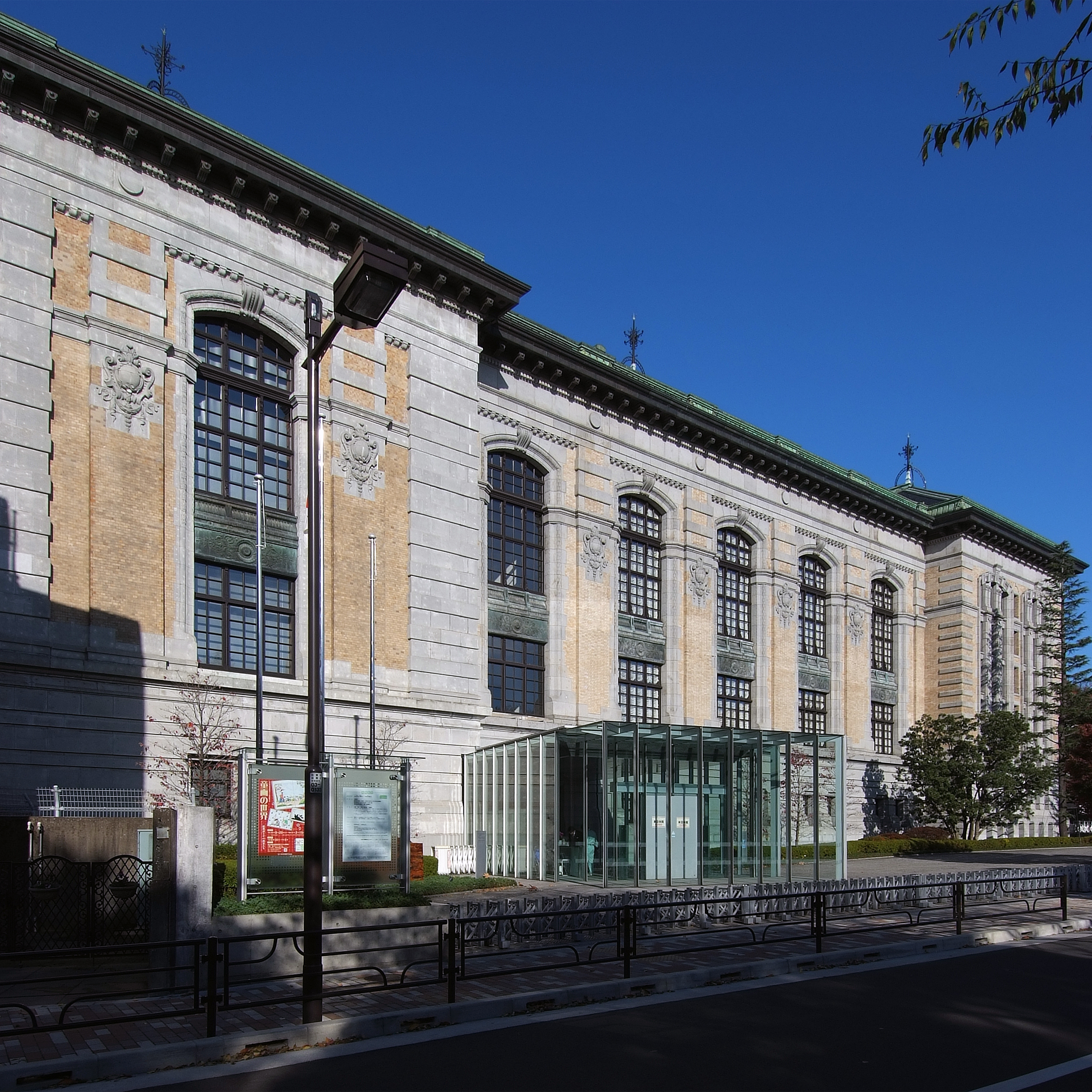
International Library of Children's Literature

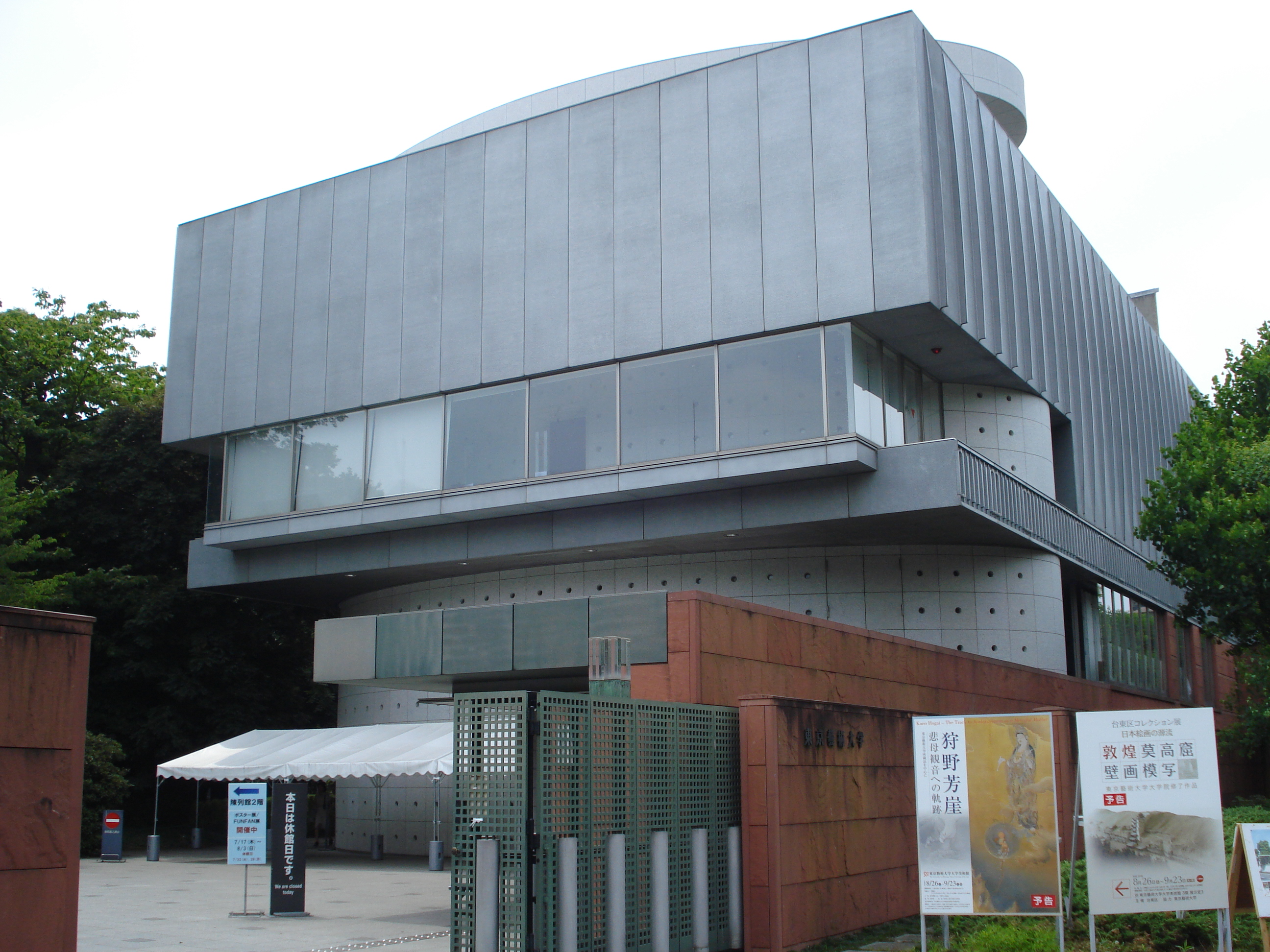
The University Art Museum, Tokyo University of the Arts

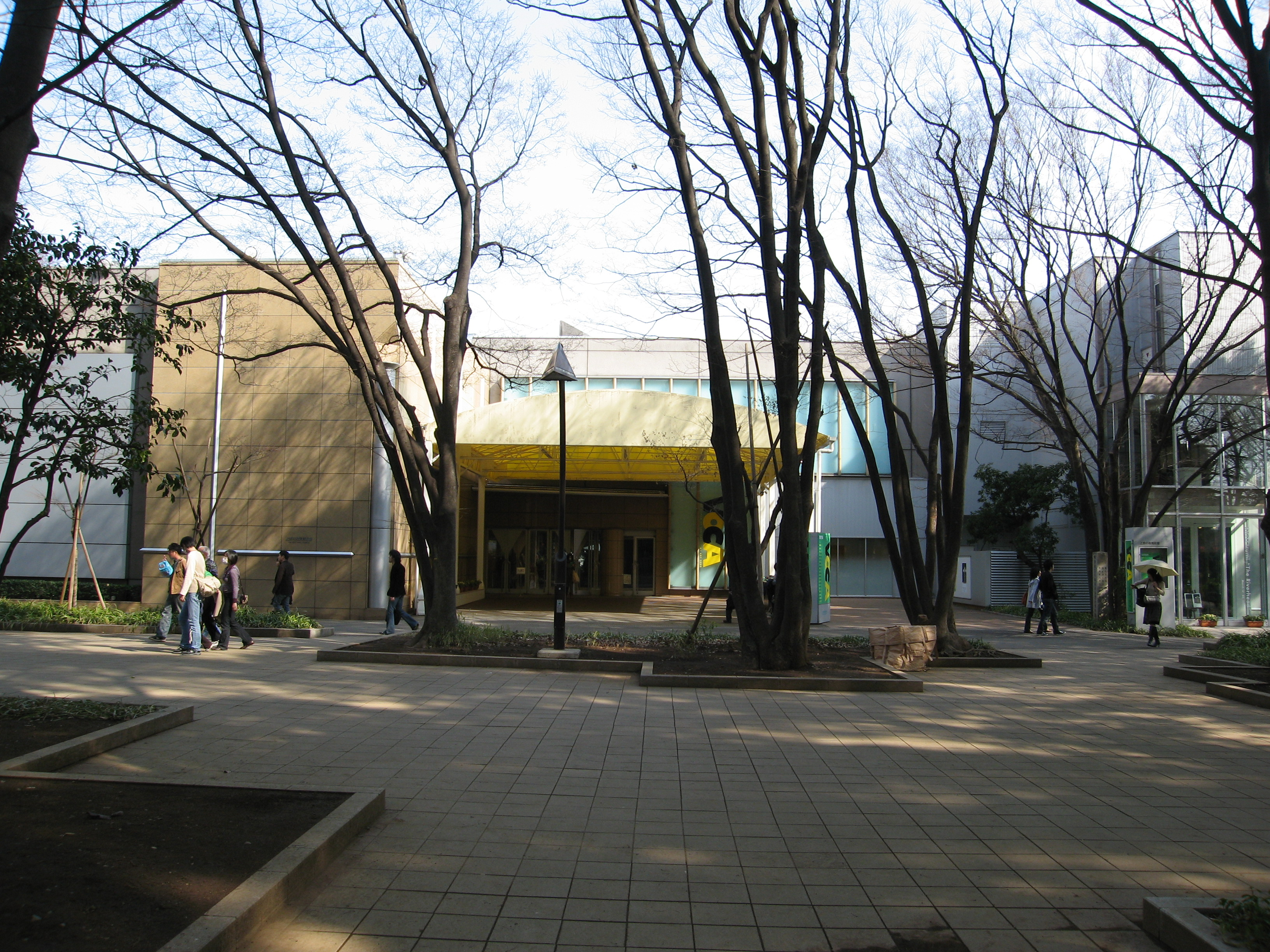
Ueno Royal Museum

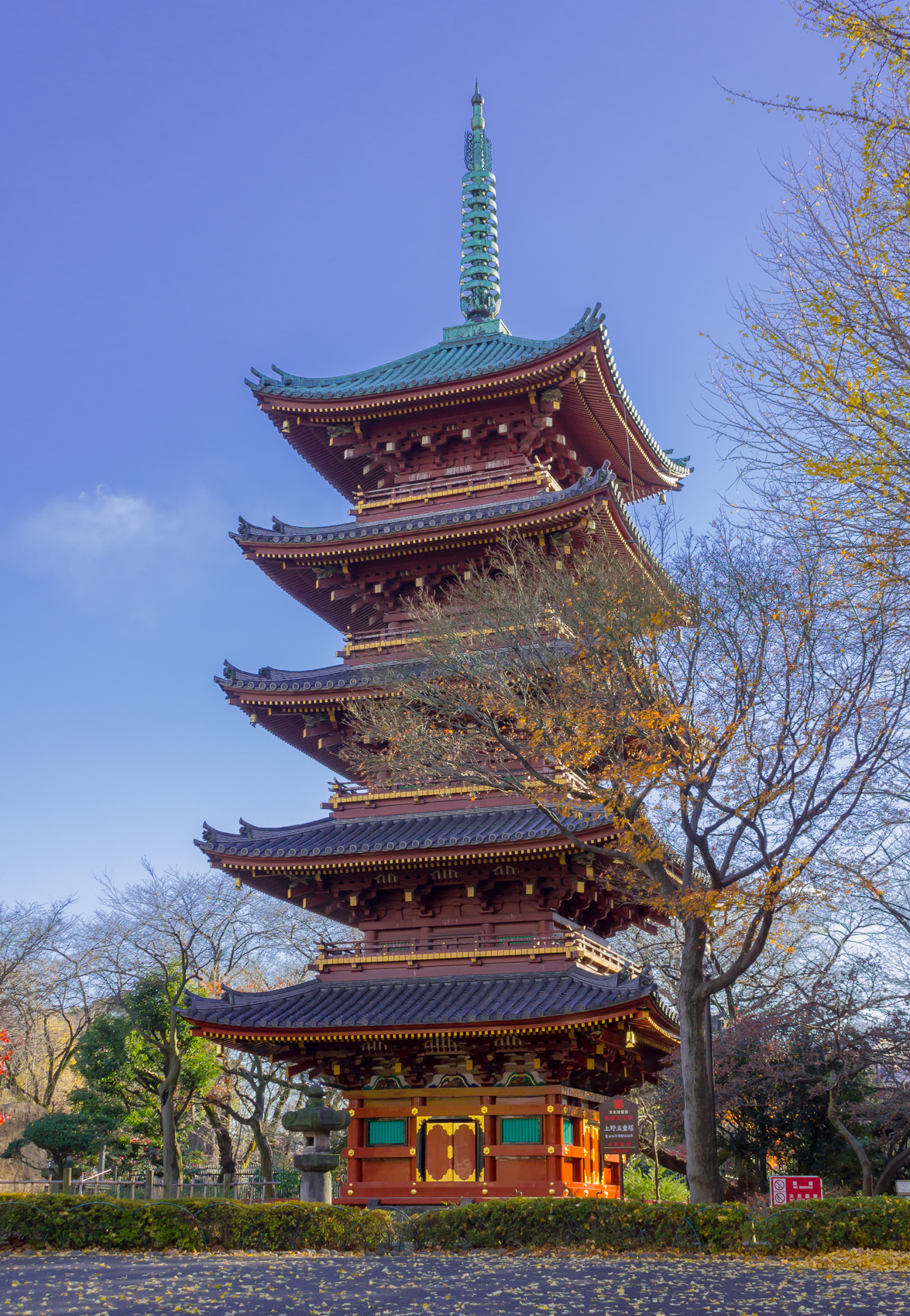
Pagoda of Kan'ei-ji

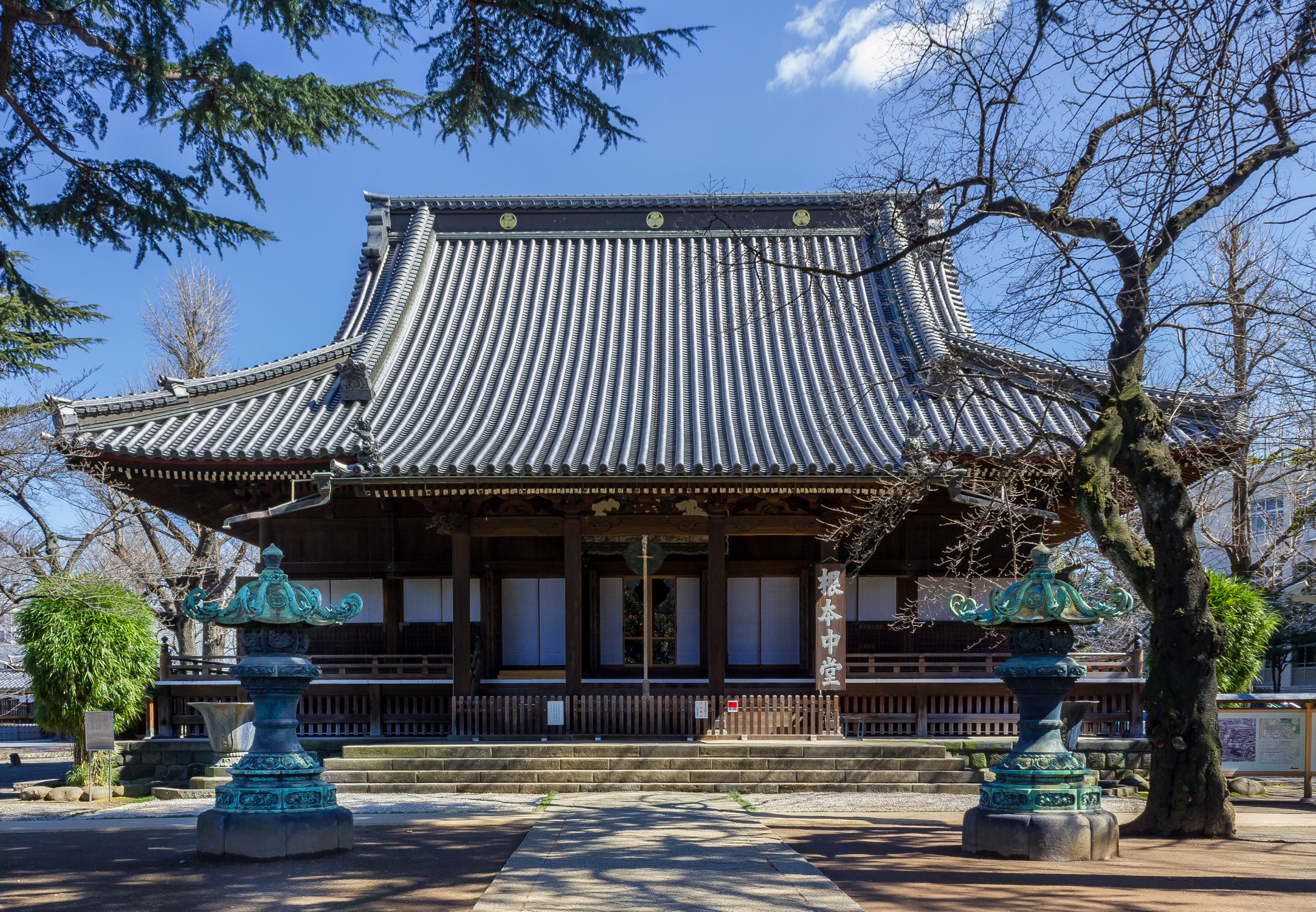
Kan'ei-ji Hondō

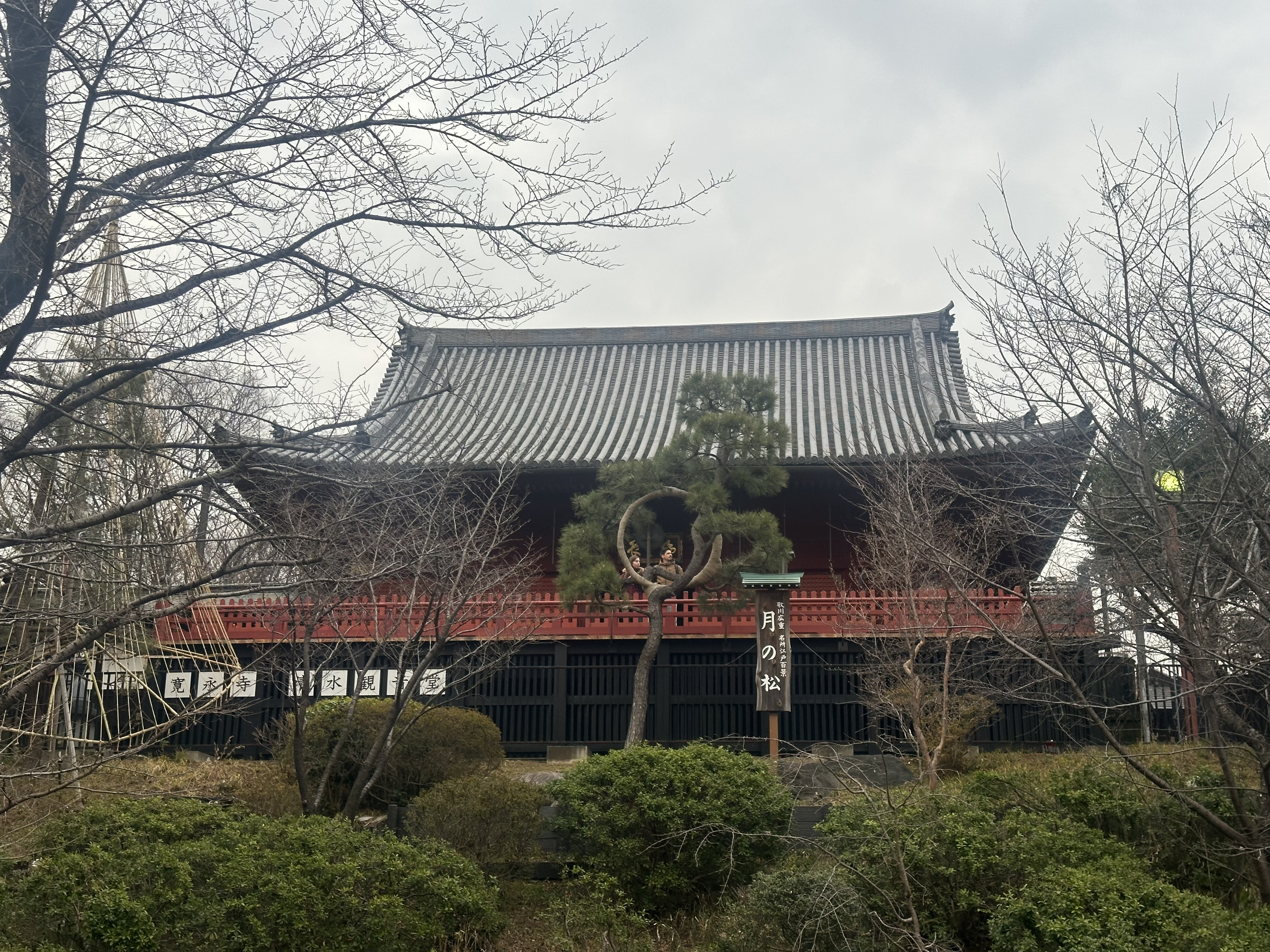
Kiyomizu Kannondō

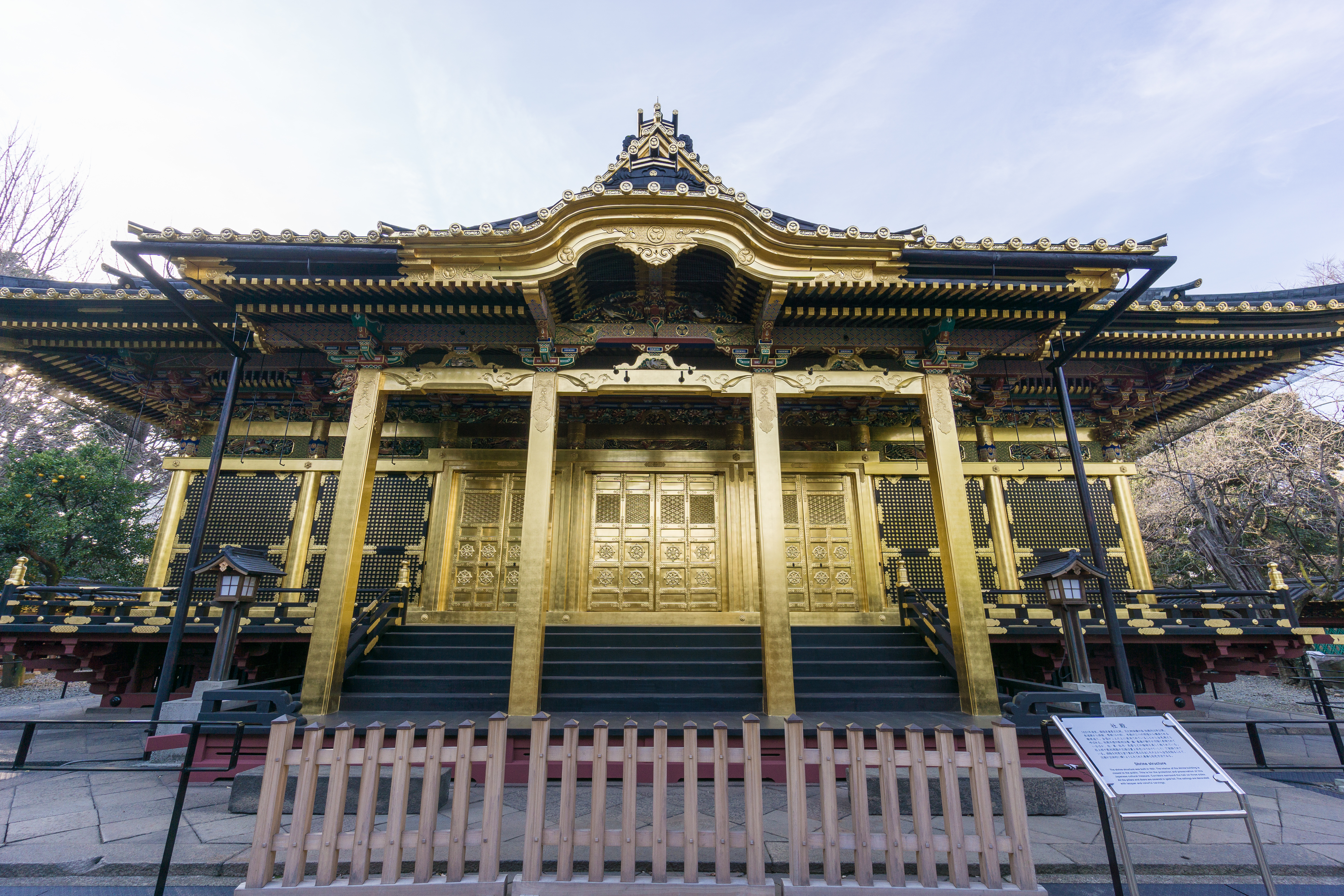
Ueno Tōshō-gū

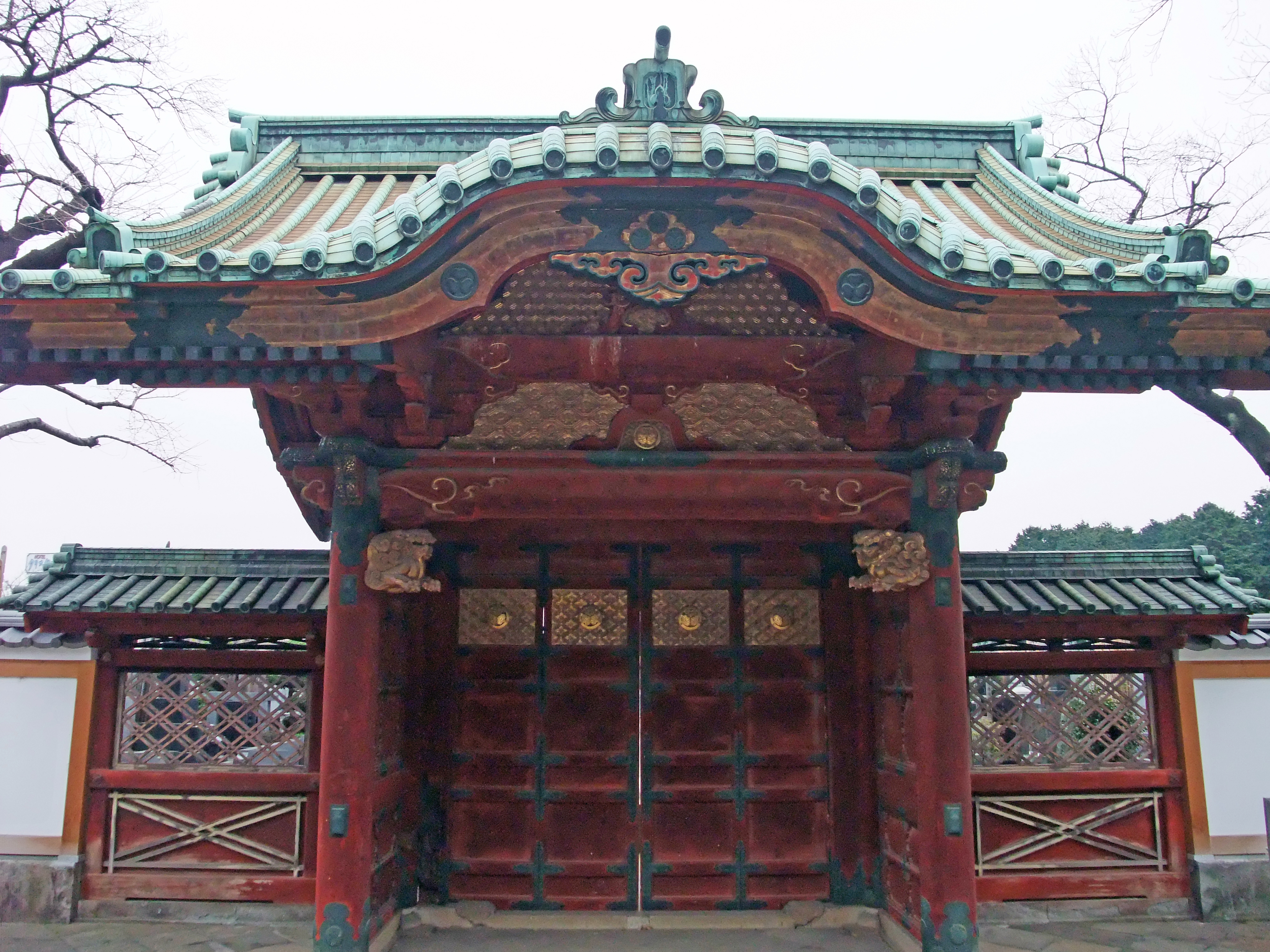
Tokugawa mausoleum

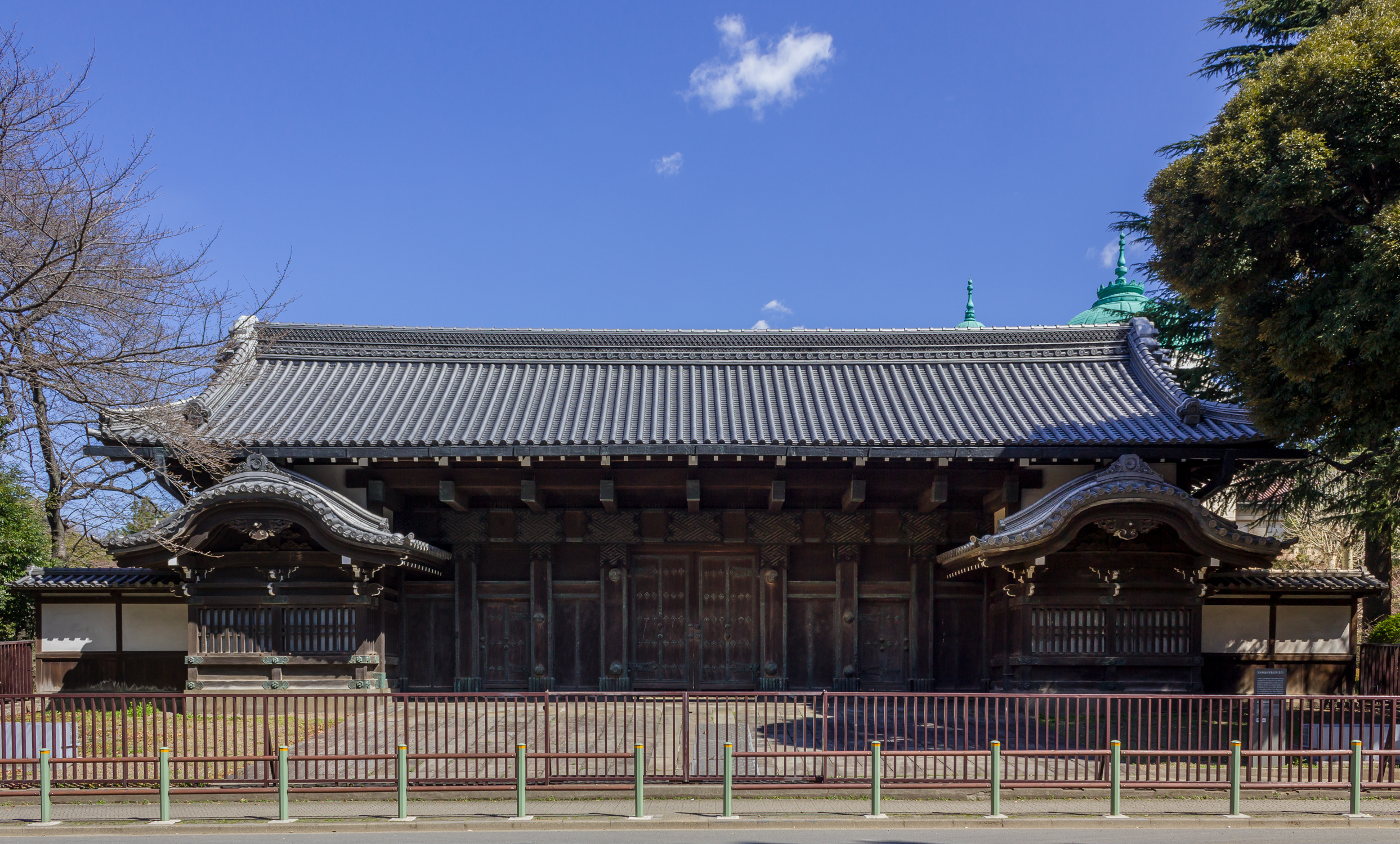
Kuromon

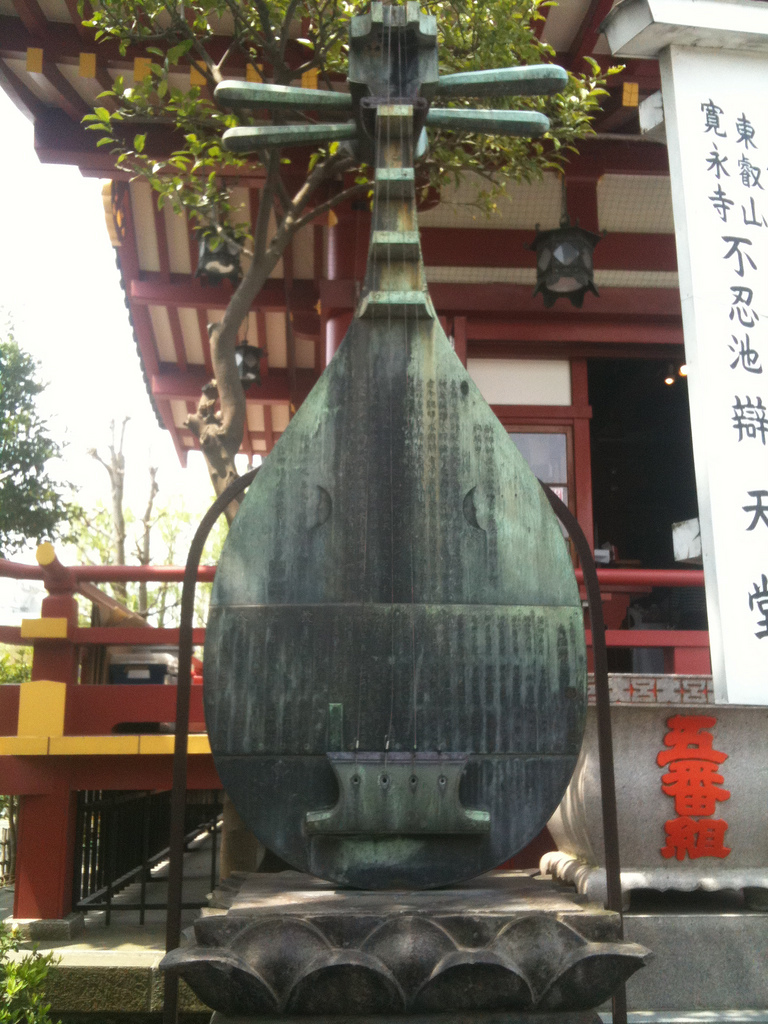
Bentendō

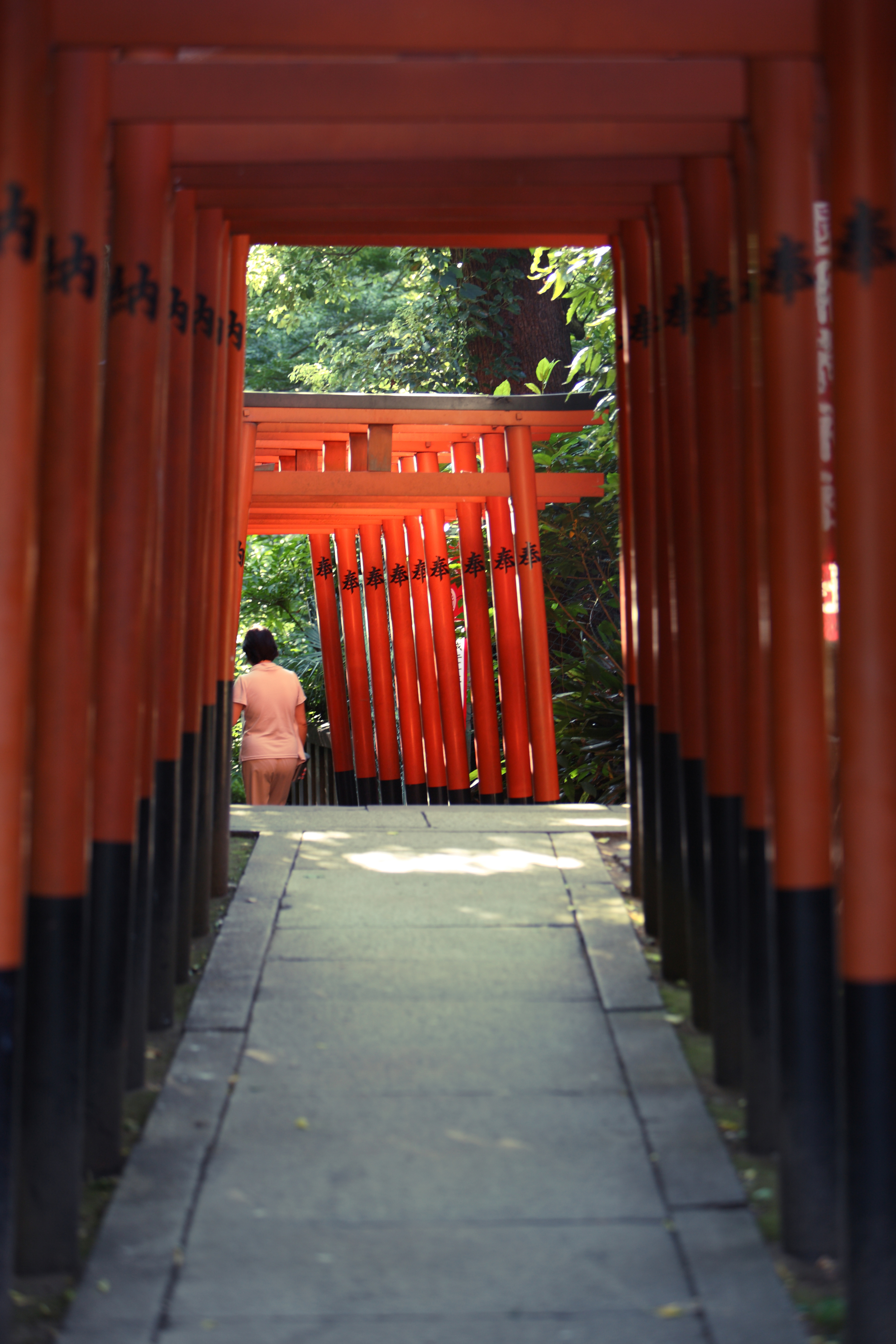
Gojōten Jinja (Hanazono Inari Jinja)

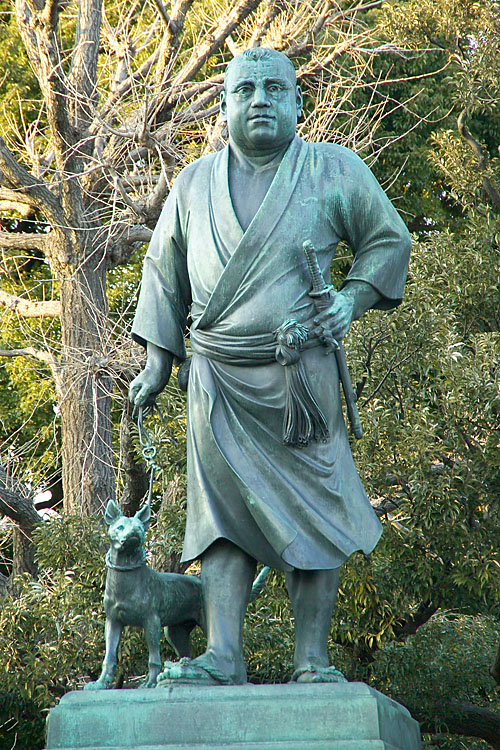
Statue of Saigō Takamori walking his dog

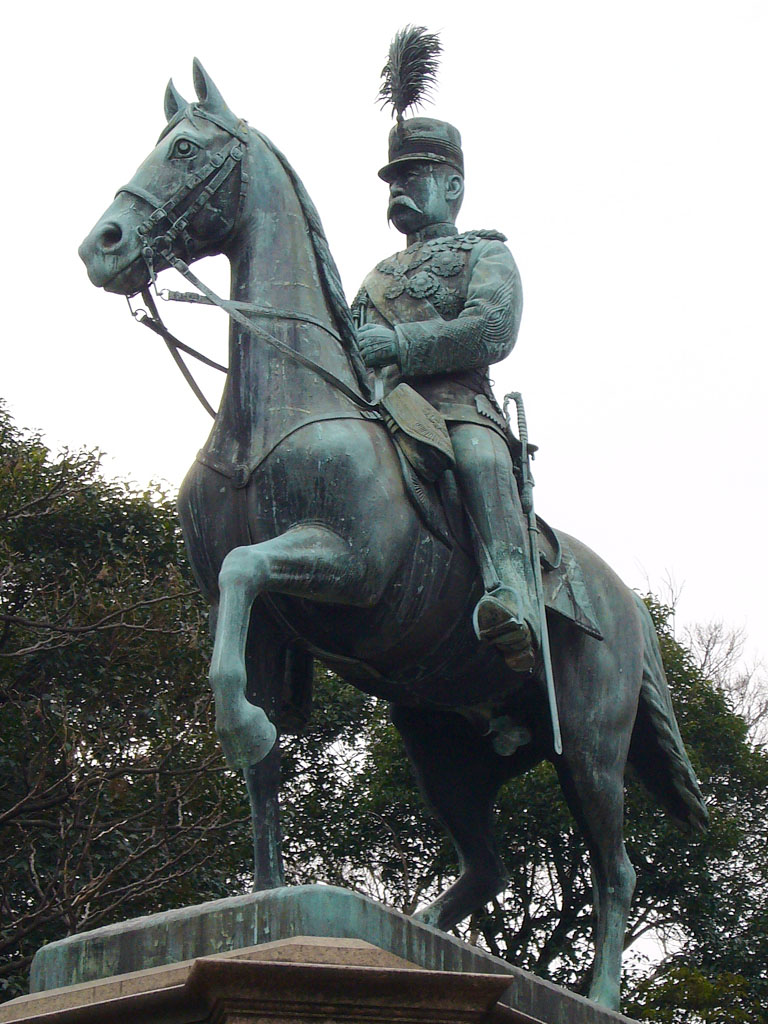
Equestrian statue of Prince Komatsu Akihito

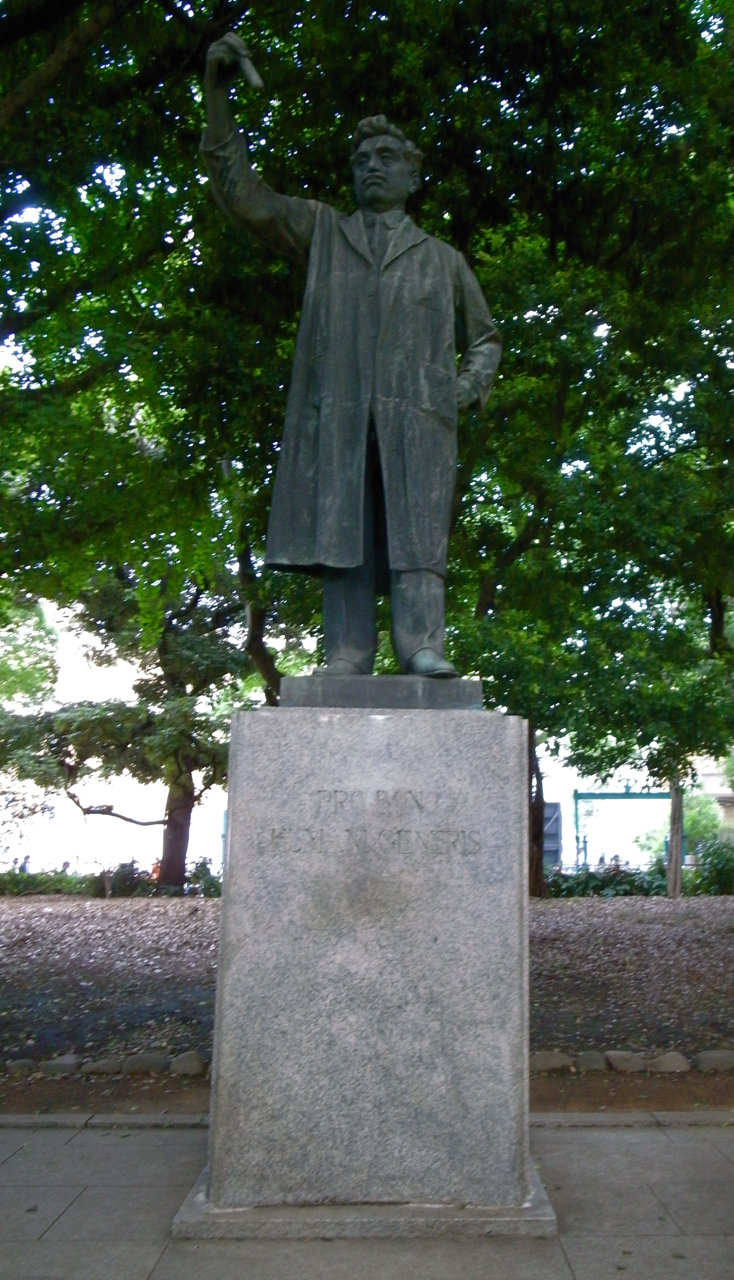
Statue of Hideyo Noguchi

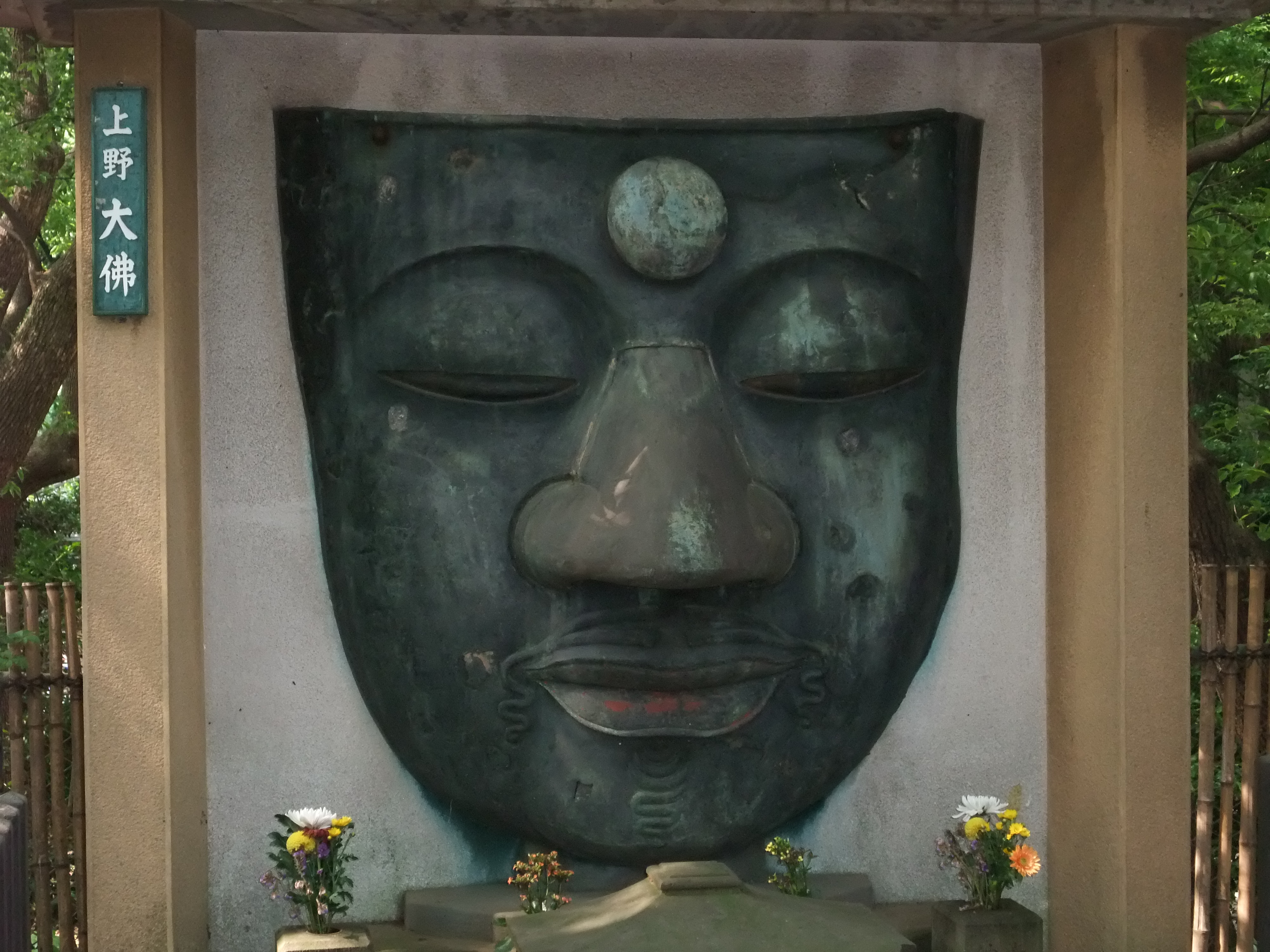
Remains of the Ueno Daibutsu

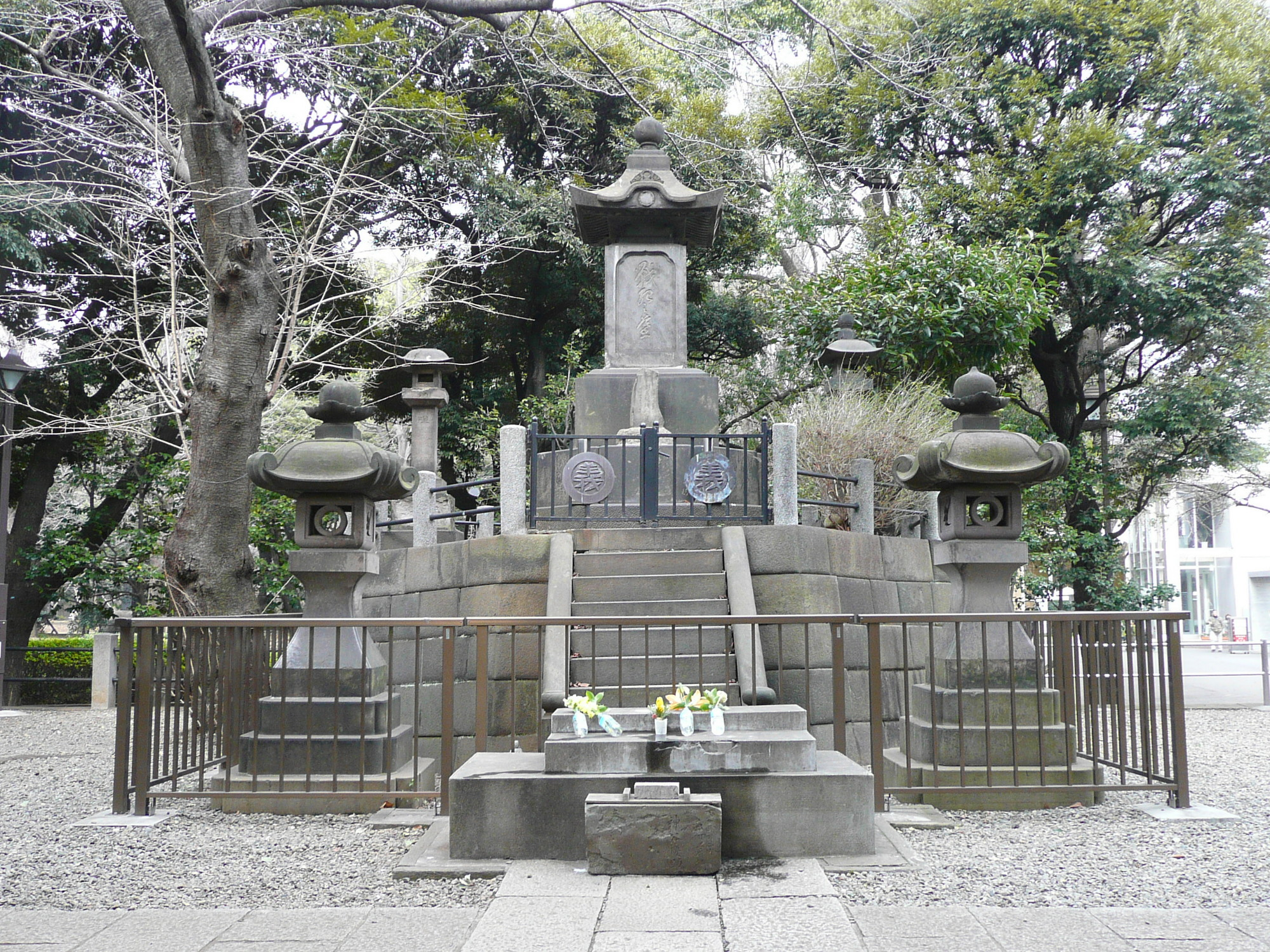
Monument to the Shōgitai

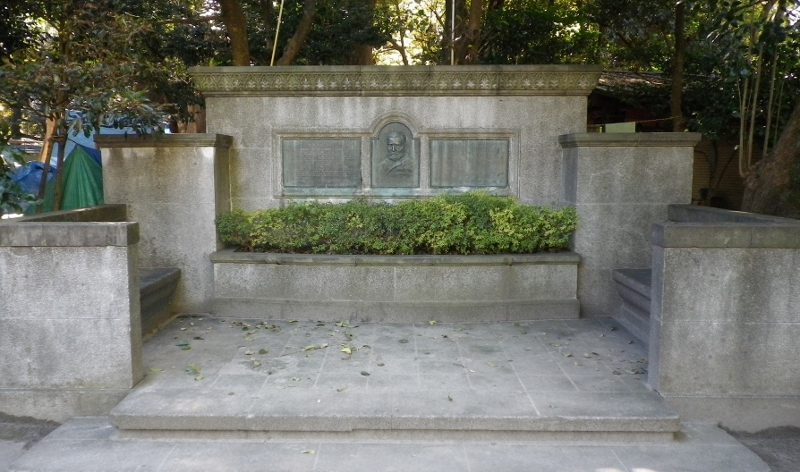
Monument to Ulysses Grant

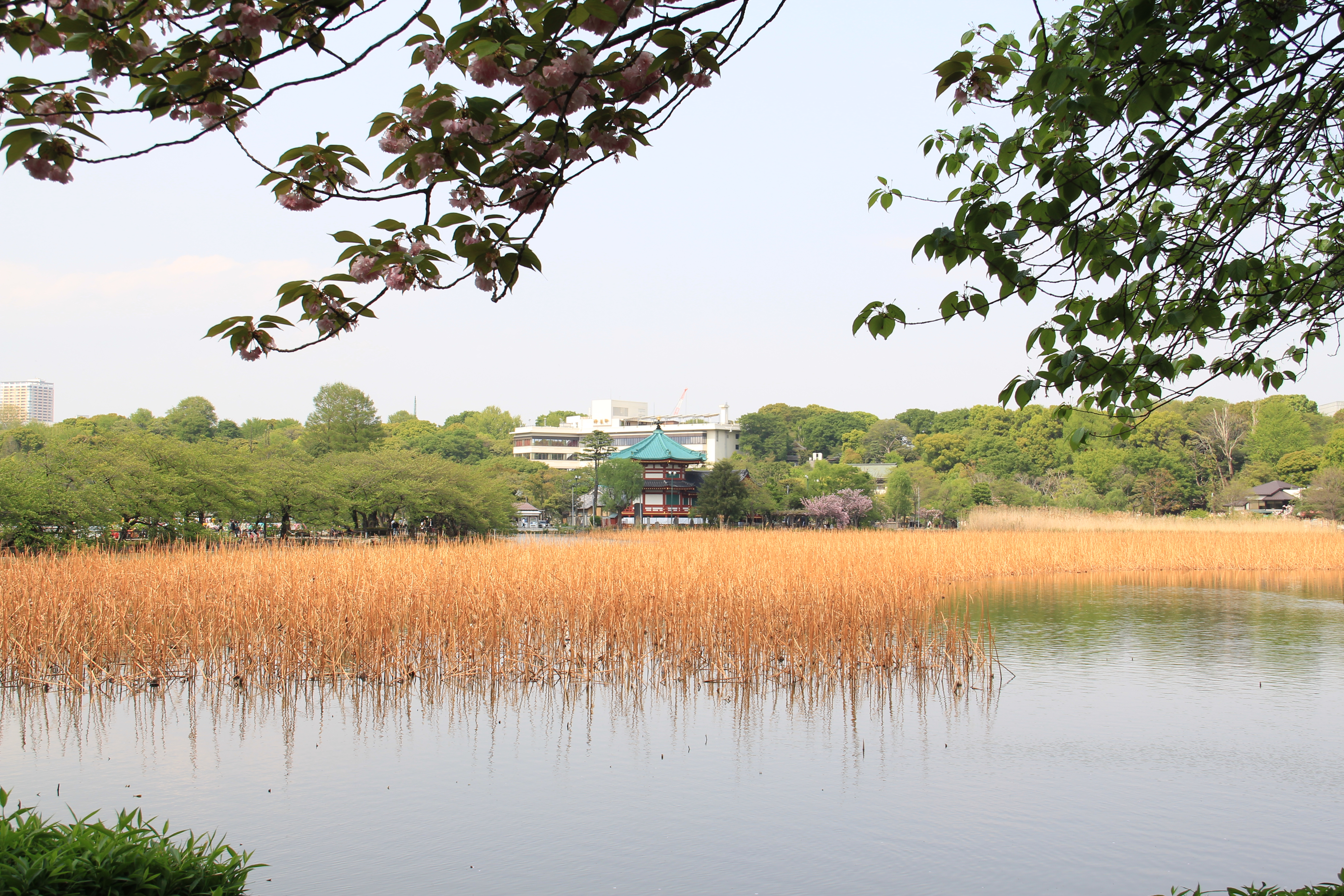
Shinobazu Pond

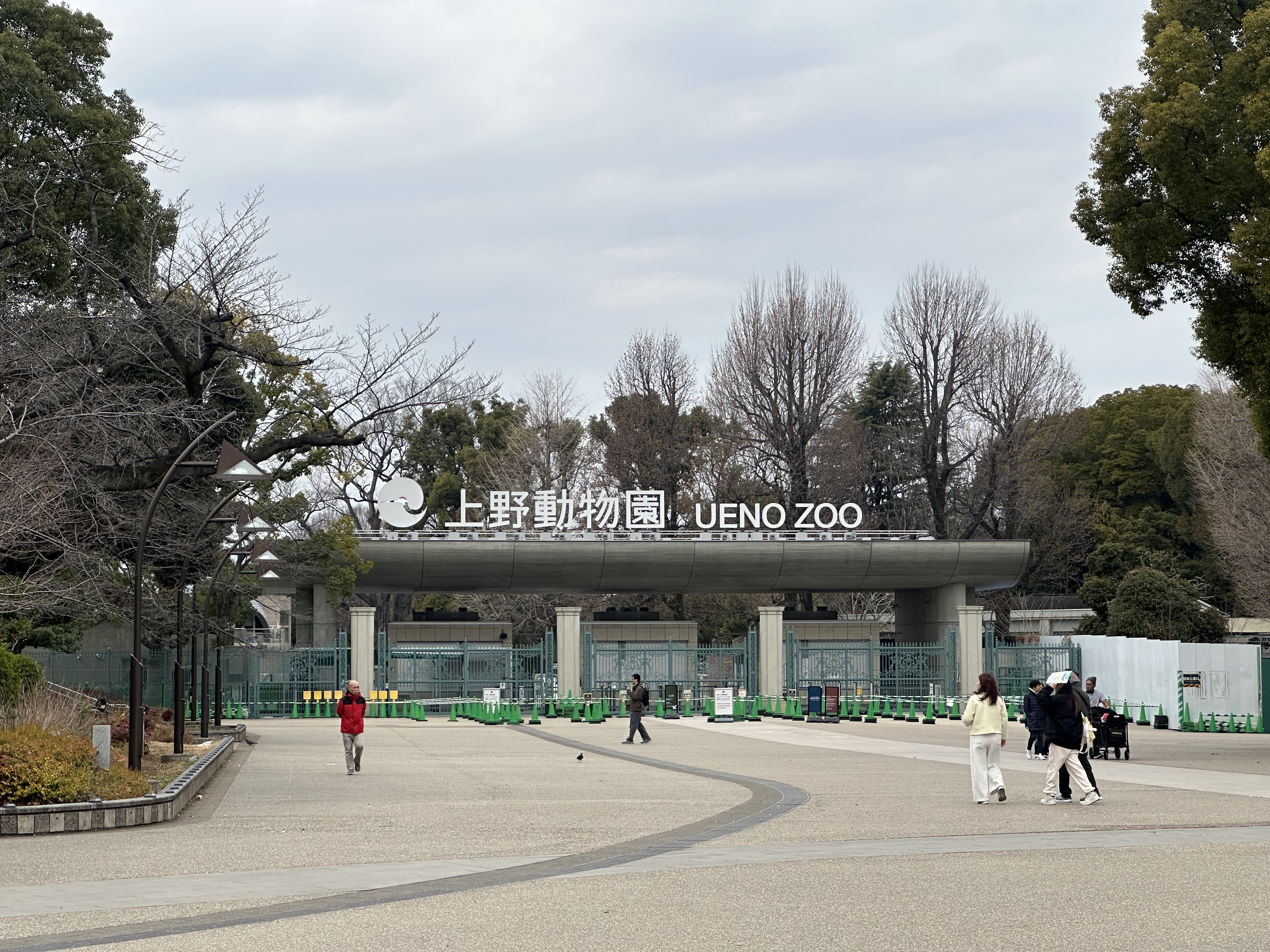
Ueno Zoo

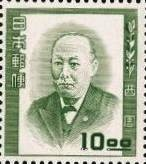
Japan Academy

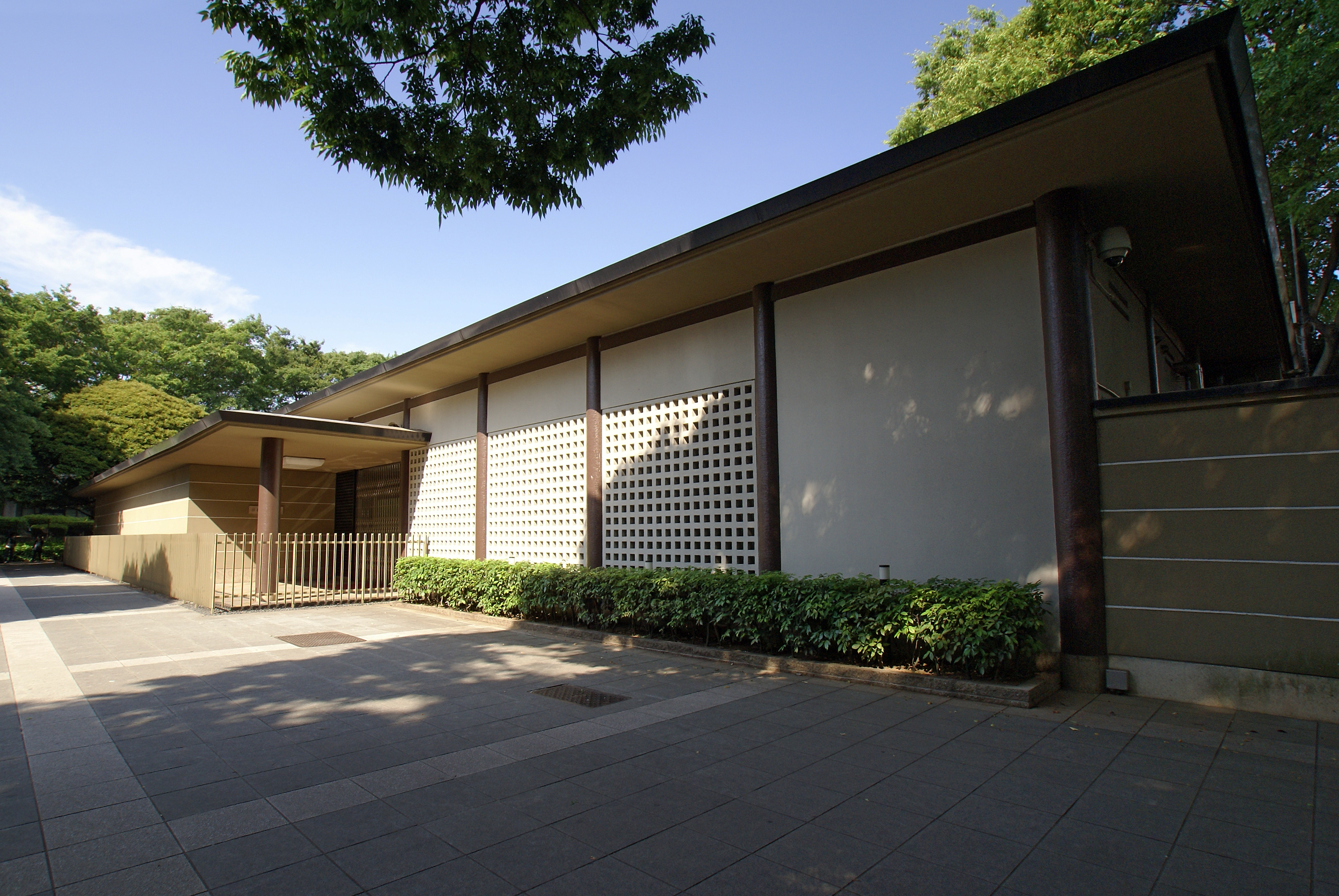
Japan Art Academy

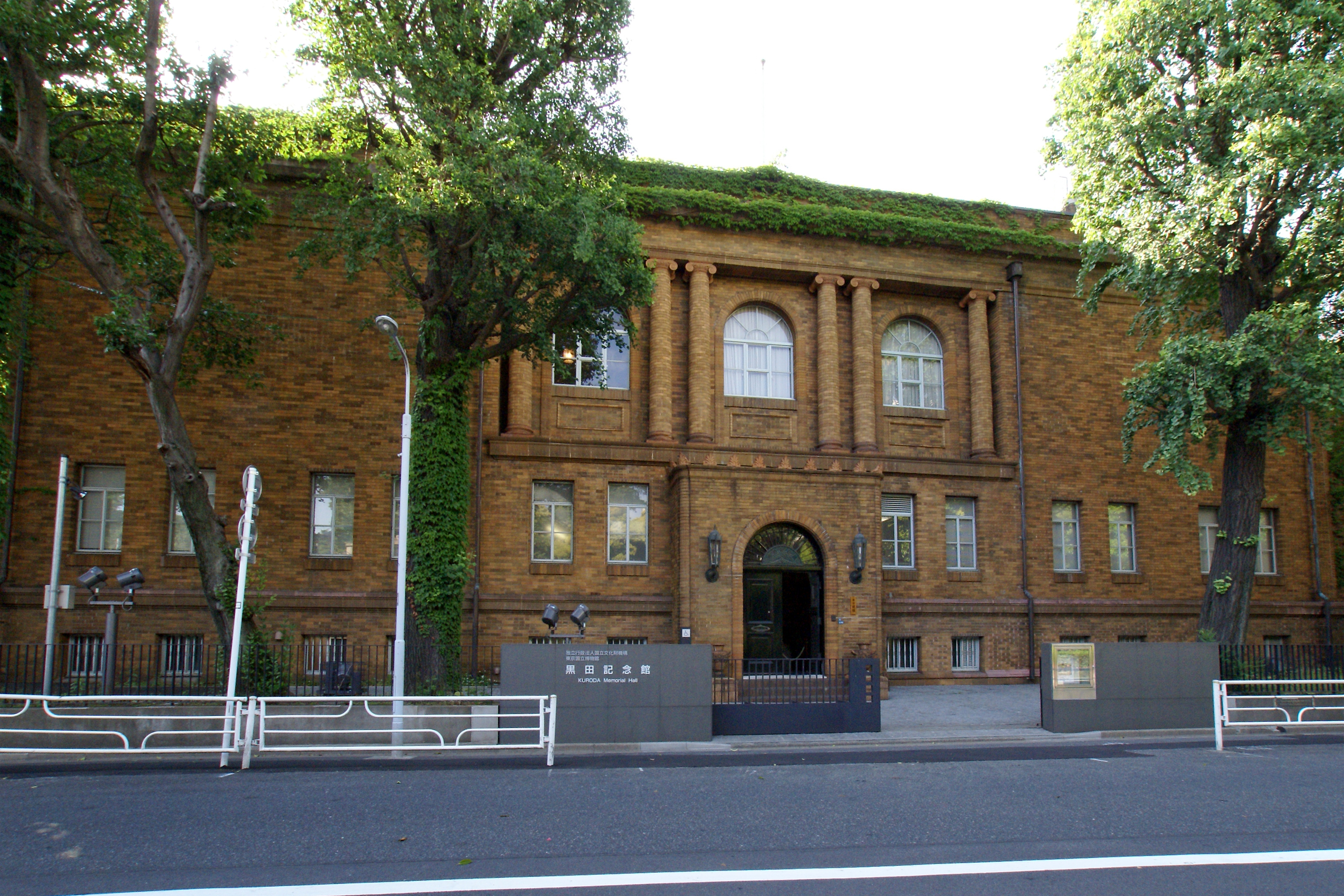
Kuroda Memorial Hall, National Research Institute for Cultural Properties, Tokyo

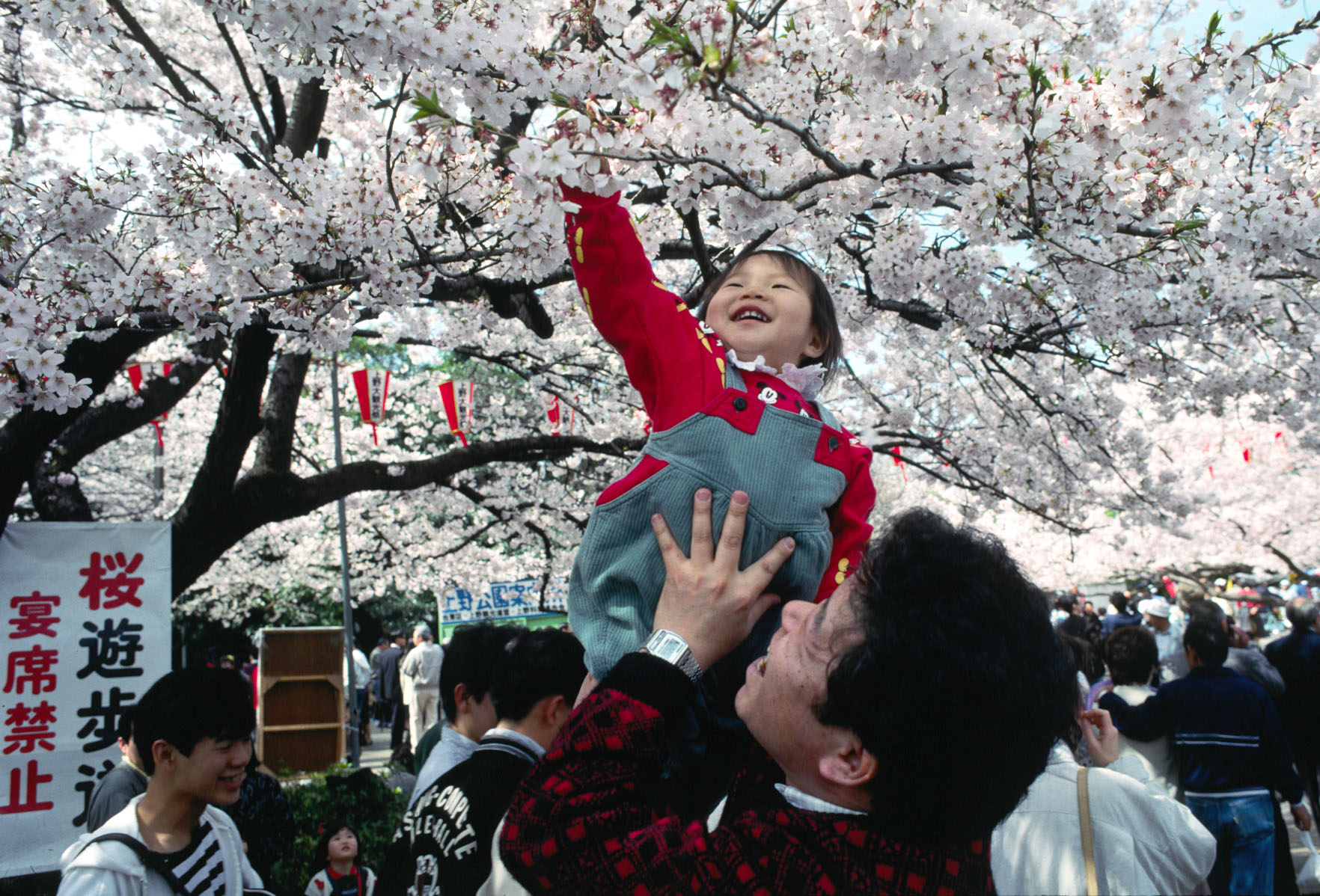
Hanami

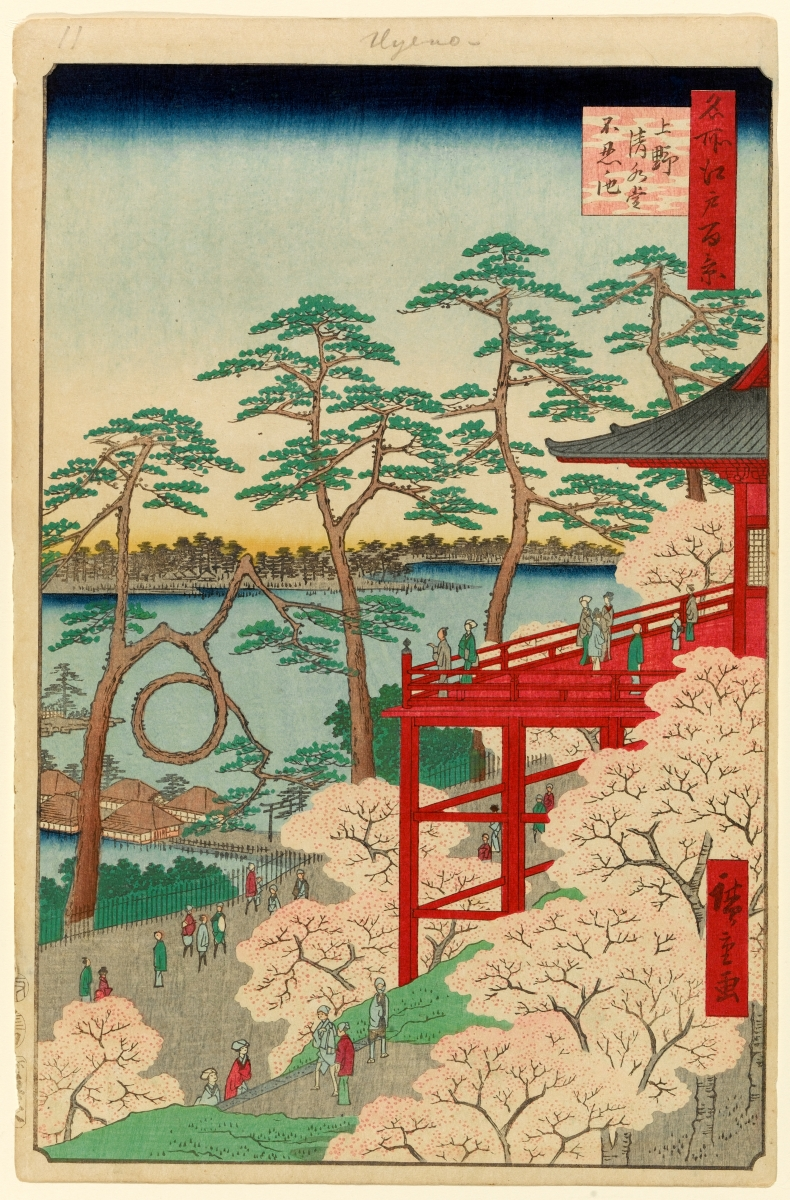
Hiroshige

== See also ==
- Meiji period
- National Parks of Japan
- Parks and gardens in Tokyo
- World Heritage Sites in Japan
