= Tokyo Bunka Kaikan =

Concert hall in Tokyo, Japan

Coordinates: 35°42′51″N 139°46′31″E

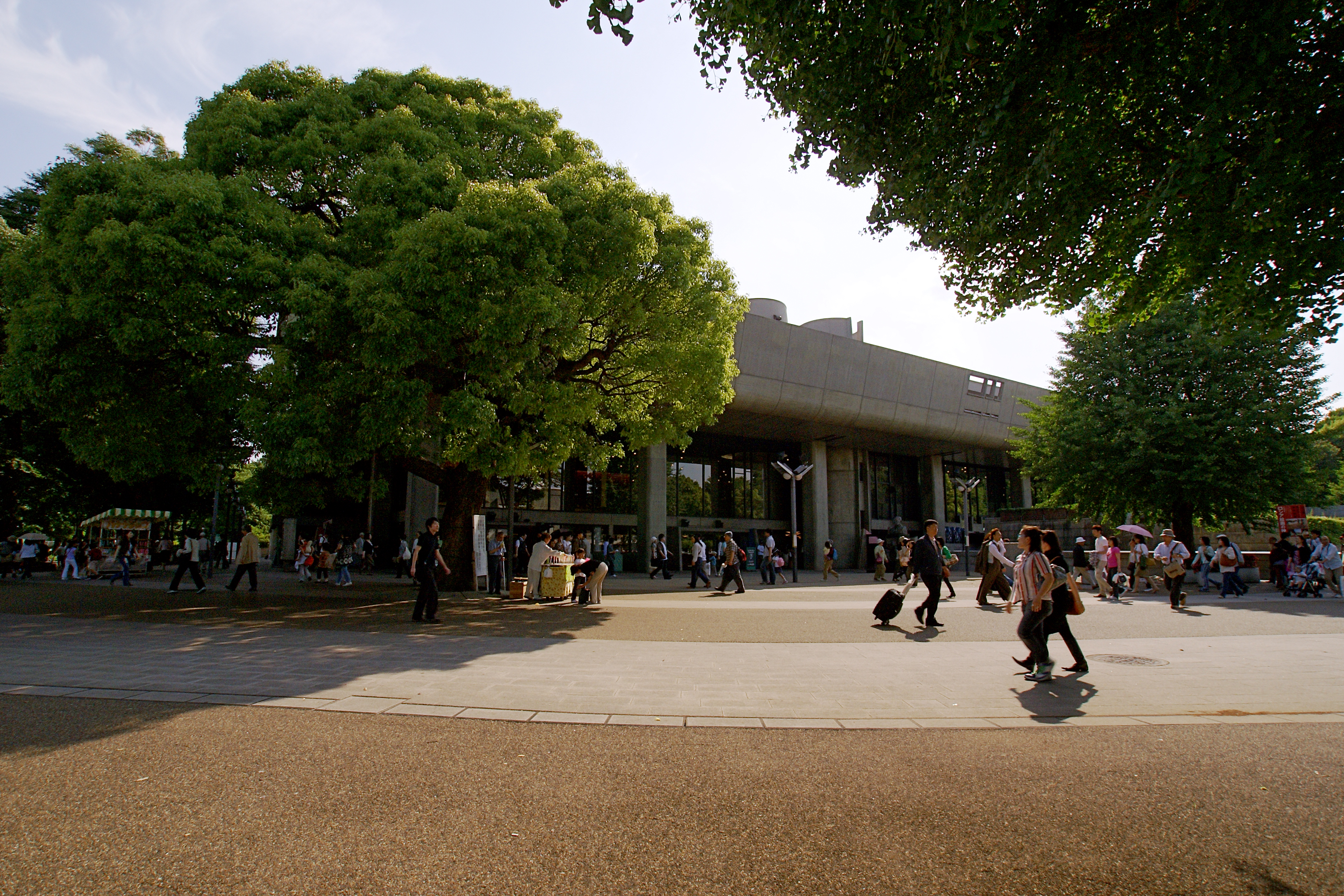
Tokyo Bunka Kaikan in Ueno Park

The Tokyo Bunka Kaikan (東京文化会館) is a Japanese concert hall located in Ueno Park, Taitō, Tokyo. Designed by Japanese architect Kunio Maekawa, it was built in 1961 and renovated in 1998–99. Its larger hall seats 2303 people, and its small hall seats 649. It is operated by the Tokyo Metropolitan Foundation for History and Culture.

== Venues ==
- Main Hall
- Recital Hall

== Access ==
- Ueno Station (with JR East and Tokyo Metro)
- Keisei Ueno Station (with Keisei Electric Railway)

== See also ==
- Suntory Hall
- New National Theatre Tokyo
- Sōgakudo Concert Hall
