= Sendagi Station =

Metro station in Tokyo, Japan

Coordinates: 35.725328°N 139.763185°E

Sendagi Station 千駄木駅

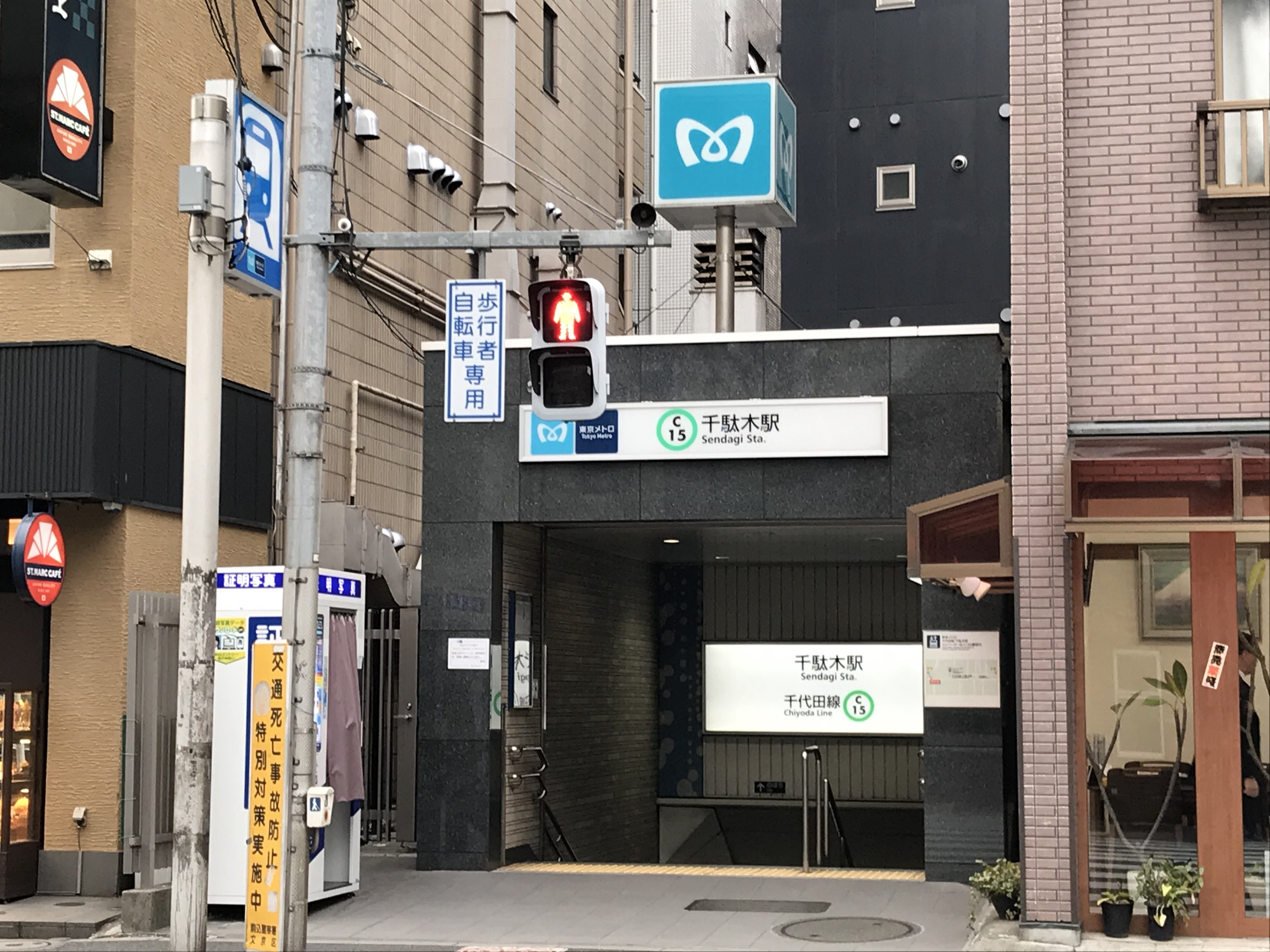
- Sendagi Station

General information
- Location: 3-36-7 Sendagi, Bunkyō-ku, Tokyo; Japan
- Operator: Tokyo Metro
- Line: Chiyoda Line
- Platforms: 2 split side platforms
- Tracks: 2

Construction
- Structure type: Underground

Other information
- Station code: C-15

History
- Opened: 20 December 1969; 56 years ago

Services
Preceding station	Tokyo Metro	Following station
Nezu towards Yoyogi-Uehara	Chiyoda Line	Nishi-nippori towards Kita-Ayase
Location
- Location within Tokyo Yamanote Loop Location within Tokyo wards area Location within Japan

Sendagi Station (千駄木駅, Sendagi-eki) is an underground railway station on the Tokyo Metro Chiyoda Line in Bunkyo, Tokyo, Japan, operated by Tokyo Metro.

== Lines ==
Sendagi Station is served by the Tokyo Metro Chiyoda Line, and is numbered C-15.

== Station layout ==
The station consists of two side platforms located on separate levels.

=== Platforms ===
1	Chiyoda Line	for Otemachi and Yoyogi-uehara; Odakyu Odawara Line for Hon-Atsugi and Isehara
2	Chiyoda Line	for Kita-senju, Ayase and Kita-ayase; Jōban Line (Local) for Abiko and Toride

== Surrounding area ==
- Dōkan-yama
- Yanaka shopping area and Yanaka Cemetery
- Nippon Medical School

== History ==
Sendagi Station was opened on 20 December 1969 by the Teito Rapid Transit Authority (TRTA).

The station facilities were inherited by Tokyo Metro after the privatization of the TRTA in 2004.
