= Sōgakudō Concert Hall =

Former concert hall in Tokyo, Japan

Coordinates: 35.718034°N 139.773125°E

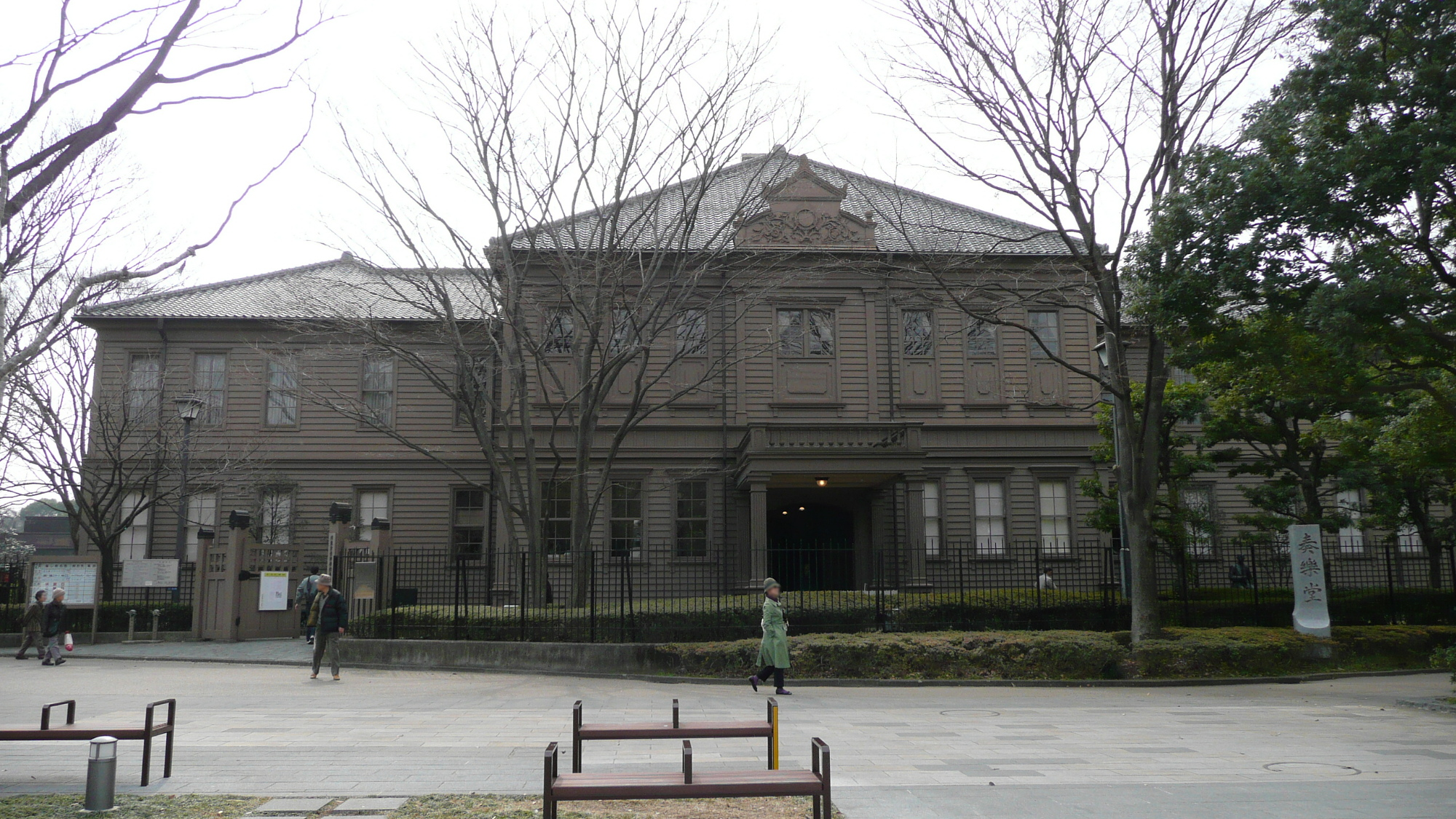
The old Sōgakudō Concert Hall

The Sōgakudō Concert Hall (奏楽堂) is a concert hall in Taitō, Tokyo, Japan.

== Old Hall ==
Established in 1890, it is the oldest western-style concert hall in Japan. Formerly the hall belonged to the Tokyo Music School, now the Tokyo University of the Arts. By 1972, it had become too old for school use, so Taitō Ward obtained the property, now designated an Important Cultural Property. The hall was rebuilt in Ueno Park, and nearby stands the statue of Rentarō Taki, one of its alumni.

== New Hall ==
The new Sōgakudō Concert Hall opened on the university campus in April 1998. The structure, by Okada Architect & Associates with acoustical design by Nagata Acoustics, is insulated from the vibrations of the subway below by rubber springs.

== Access ==
- Ueno Station (with JR East and Tokyo Metro)
- Uguisudani Station (with JR East)
- Keisei Ueno Station (with Keisei Electric Railway)
