= Uguisudani Station =

Railway station in Tokyo, Japan

Coordinates: 35.722066°N 139.777851°E

JY06 JK31 Uguisudani Station 鶯谷駅
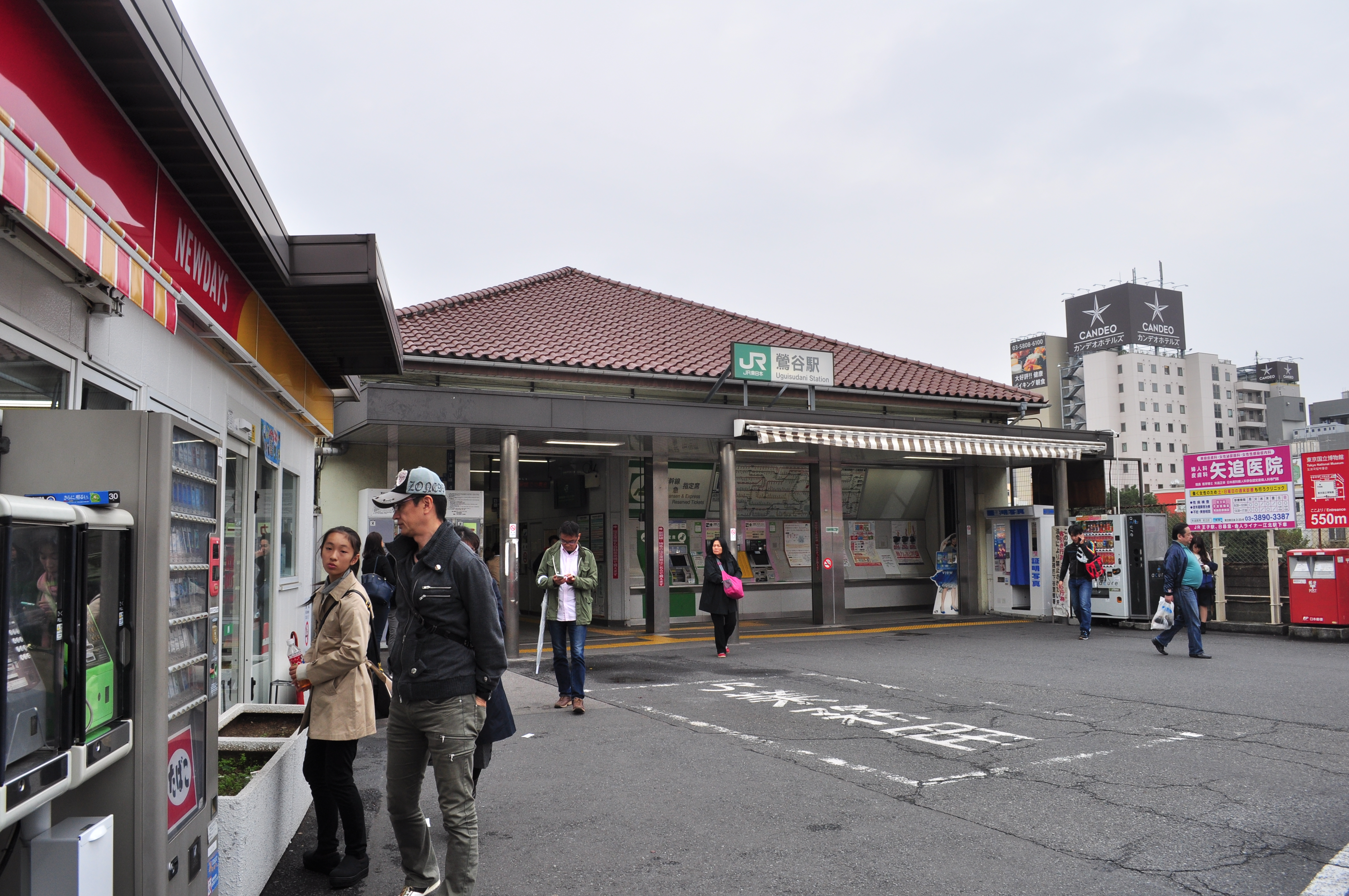
- The south entrance of Uguisudani Station in November 2014

General information
- Location: 1 Negishi, Taitō City, Tokyo; Japan
- Operator: JR East
- Lines: Yamanote Line; Keihin–Tōhoku Line
- Platforms: 2 island platforms
- Tracks: 4

Construction
- Structure type: At grade

Other information
- Station code: JK31; JY06

History
- Opened: 11 July 1912; 114 years ago

Passengers
- FY2024: 48,920 (daily)

Services
Preceding station	JR East	Following station
Nippori Next counter-clockwise	Yamanote Line	Ueno Next clockwise
Nippori towards Ōmiya	Keihin–Tōhoku Line Local	Ueno towards Yokohama
Location
- Location within Tokyo Yamanote Loop Location within Tokyo wards area Location within Japan

Uguisudani Station (鶯谷駅, Uguisudani-eki) is a railway station in Taitō, Tokyo, Japan, operated by East Japan Railway Company (JR East). The name relates to a valley where formerly many Japanese bush warblers (uguisu) were found. The station is to the north of the Tokyo National Museum and Ueno Park.

== Lines ==
Uguisudani Station is served by the Yamanote and Keihin-Tohoku lines.

== Station layout ==
The station consists of two island platforms serving four tracks.

=== Platforms ===
1	Keihin-Tōhoku Line	for Akabane, Urawa, and Omiya
2	Yamanote Line	for Ikebukuro and Shinjuku
3	Yamanote Line	for Ueno and Tokyo
4	Keihin-Tōhoku Line	for Tokyo, Shinagawa, and Yokohama

== History ==
The station opened on 11 July 1912.

Chest-high platform edge doors were installed on the Yamanote Line platforms (platforms 2 and 3) in September 2014, with operation commencing on 18 October 2014.

Station numbering was introduced in 2016 with Uguisudani being assigned station numbers JY06 for the Yamanote line and JK31 for the Keihin-Tōhoku line.

== Surrounding area ==
- Tokyo National Museum
- Ueno Park
- Iriya Station (on the Tokyo Metro Hibiya Line)
- Nezu Station (on the Tokyo Metro Chiyoda Line)

== See also ==
- List of railway stations in Japan
