= Nezu Station =

Metro station in Tokyo, Japan

Coordinates: 35.717376°N 139.765744°E

Nezu Station 根津駅

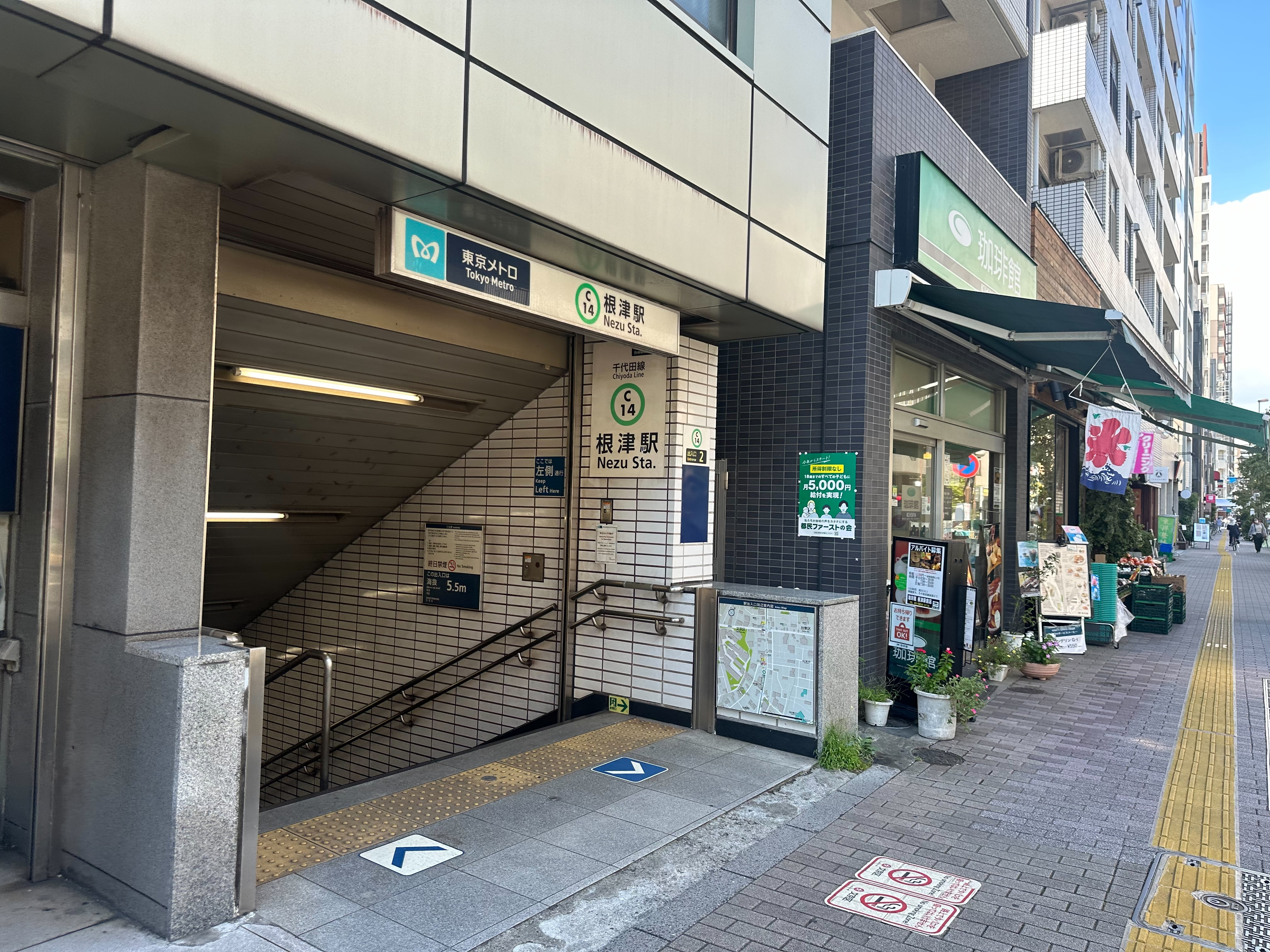
- Nezu Station exit 2

General information
- Location: Bunkyō, Tokyo; Japan
- Operator: Tokyo Metro
- Line: Chiyoda Line
- Platforms: 2 split side platforms
- Tracks: 2

Construction
- Structure type: Underground

Other information
- Station code: C-14

History
- Opened: 20 December 1969; 56 years ago

Services
Preceding station	Tokyo Metro	Following station
Yushima towards Yoyogi-Uehara	Chiyoda Line	Sendagi towards Kita-Ayase
Location
- Location within Tokyo Yamanote Loop Location within Tokyo wards area Location within Japan

Nezu Station (根津駅 Nezu-eki) is a metro station on the Tokyo Metro Chiyoda Line located in Bunkyo, Tokyo.

== Station layout ==
The station is reached by stairways from the street to the ticket wickets. The station consists of two split platforms located on separate levels.

=== Platforms ===
1	Chiyoda Line	for Otemachi and Yoyogi-uehara; Odakyu Odawara Line for Hon-Atsugi and Isehara
2	Chiyoda Line	for Kita-senju, Ayase and Kita-ayase; Jōban Line (Local) for Abiko and Toride

== History ==
Nezu Station was opened for revenue service on 20 December 1969 by the Teito Rapid Transit Authority (TRTA).

The station facilities were inherited by Tokyo Metro after the privatization of the TRTA in 2004.

== Surrounding area ==
- Nezu Shrine
- Ueno Zoo
- University of Tokyo
- Sawanoya Ryokan
