= Urawa =

Urawa (浦和, Urawa) is a place name and a family name in Japan.

- Urawa as a place name can refer to:
  - Urawa-ku, Saitama is a ward of Saitama City, Saitama Prefecture, Japan.
  - Urawa, Saitama was a city and its area is now Urawa, Minami, Nishi and Sakura wards of Saitama City.
  - Urawa Red Diamonds is a professional football (soccer) club playing in the J. League.
  - Urawa University and Urawa University Junior College are located in Midori-ku, Saitama.

All the eight railway stations in the former Urawa city have "Urawa" in their names. They are either on Keihin-Tōhoku (K), Saikyō (S), Musashino (M) or Saitama Railway (R) Line.

- Urawa-ku: Urawa Station (K) and Kita-Urawa Station (K).

Urawa station also stops most Utsunomiya and Takasaki Line trains.

- Midori-ku: Higashi-Urawa Station (M) and Urawa-Misono Station (R).
- Sakura-ku: Nishi-Urawa Station (M).
- Minami-ku: Minami-Urawa Station (K and M), Musashi-Urawa Station (M & S), and Naka-Urawa Station (S).
