= Urawa Komaba Stadium =

Athletics and football venue in Saitama, Japan

- 浦和駒場スタジアム
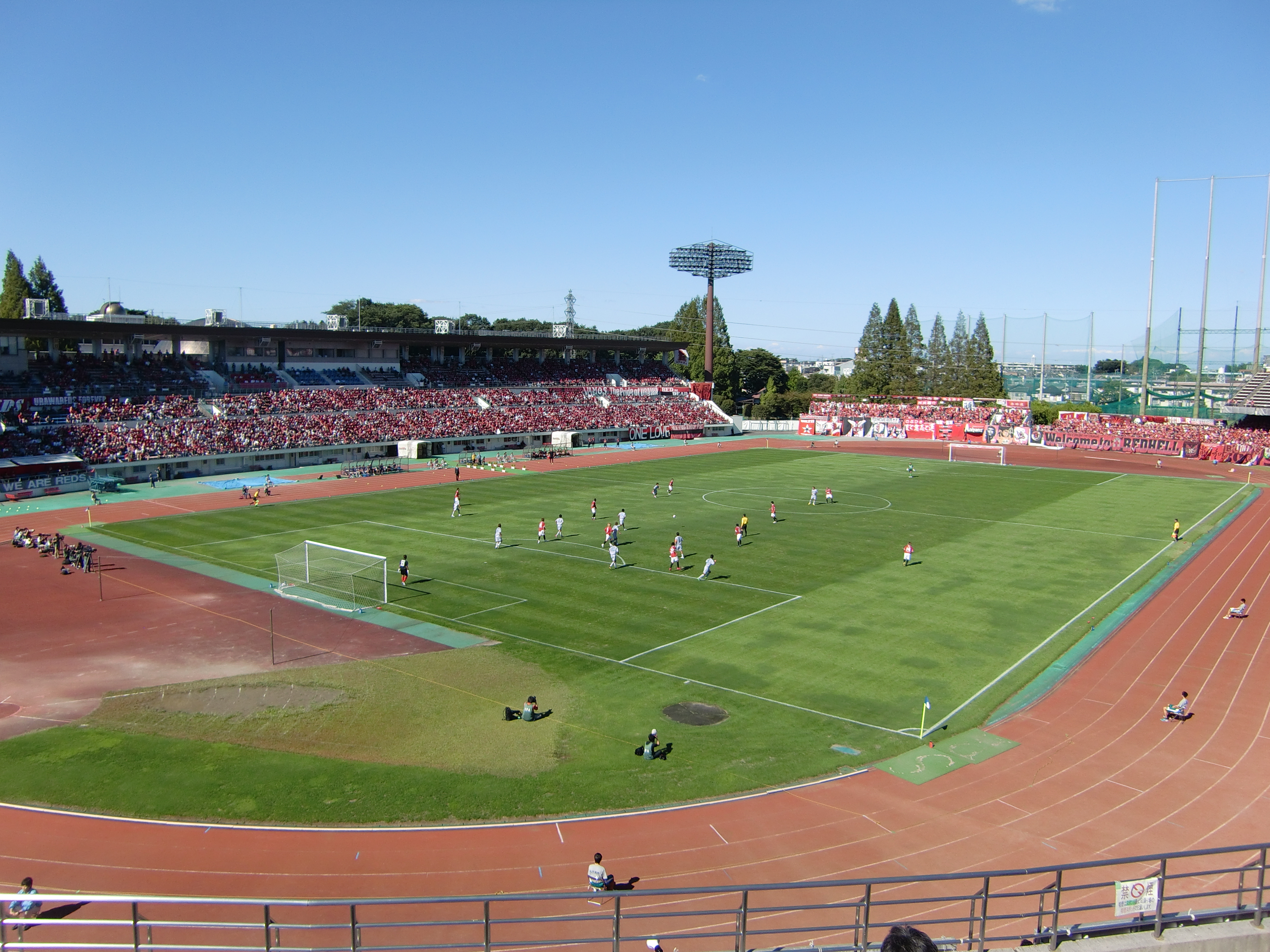
- Interactive map of Urawa Komaba Stadium
- Former names: Urawa Komaba Stadium (1967-2001); Saitama Urawa Komaba Stadium (2001-2012)
- Location: Saitama, Japan
- Coordinates: 35°52′17″N 139°39′57″E
- Owner: Saitama City
- Capacity: 21,500
- Surface: Grass
- Field size: 106 m x 70 m

Construction
- Opened: 1967
- Expanded: 1982, 1993, 1995

Tenant
- Urawa Reds Ladies; Urawa Red Diamonds

The Urawa Komaba Stadium (浦和駒場スタジアム, Urawa Komaba Sutajiamu) is an athletic stadium in Urawa-ku, Saitama, Japan. It accommodates 21,500 spectators.

It was formerly known as Saitama Urawa Komaba Stadium (さいたま市駒場スタジアム). Since May 2012, it has been called Urawa Komaba Stadium.

== Usage ==
The J.League club Urawa Red Diamonds used this stadium for lower-profile home matches from 2005 to 2007. The Reds' local rivals, Omiya Ardija, hosted many of their matches here during the expansion of Ōmiya Park Soccer Stadium.

The stadium is considered the Reds' spiritual home.

== Location ==
- Address: 1-1-2 Komaba, Urawa-ku, Saitama-shi Saitama 330-0051 JAPAN
- Transport: 20 minutes' walk from JR East Urawa Station and Kita-Urawa Station on Keihin-Tohoku Line
