= Minami-Urawa Station =

Railway station in Saitama, Japan

JK42 JM25 Minami-Urawa Station 南浦和駅
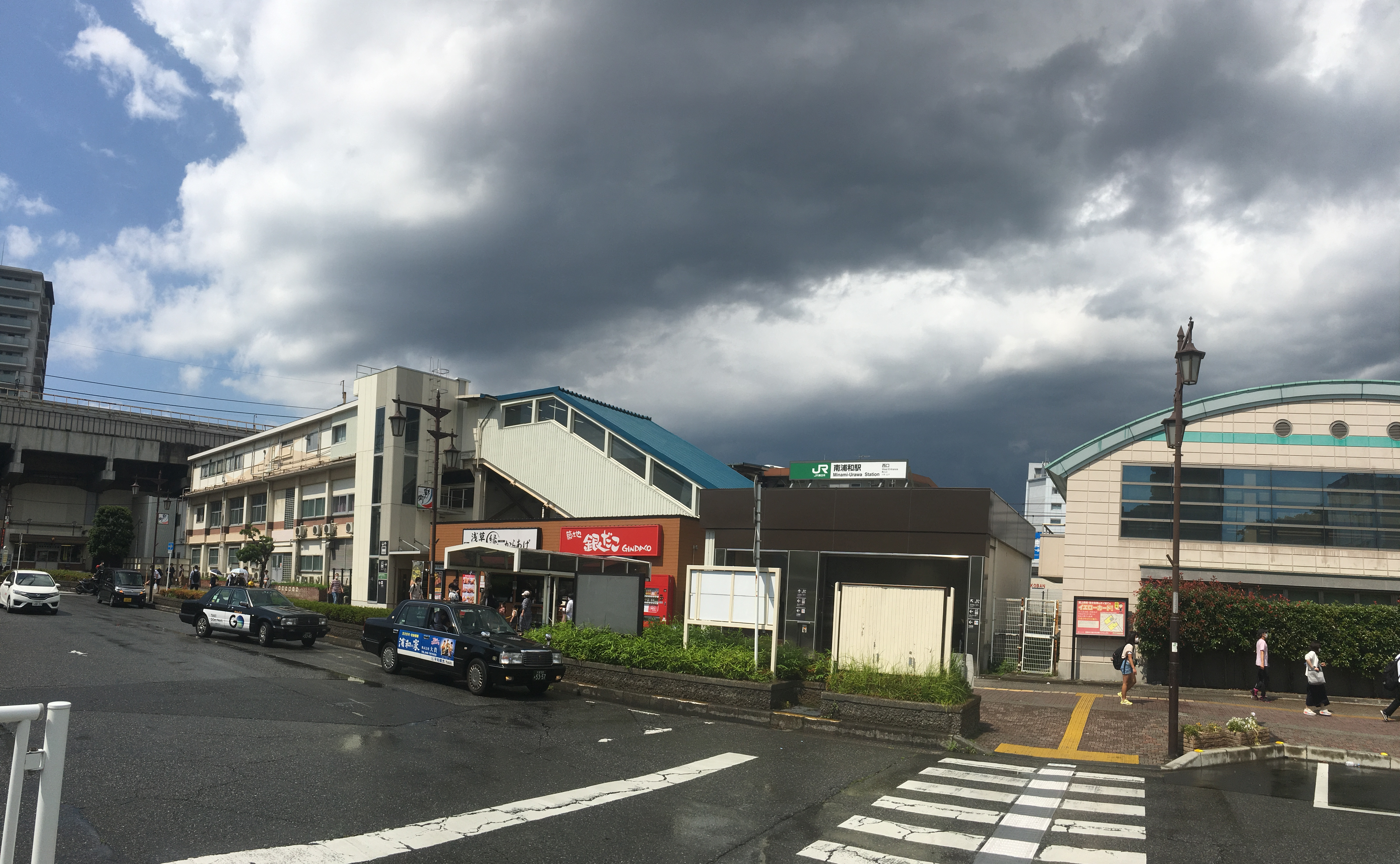
- Minami-Urawa Station west entrance, June 2022

General information
- Location: 2-37-2 Minami-Urawa, Minami Ward, Saitama City, Saitama Prefecture 336-0017; Japan
- Coordinates: 35°50′52″N 139°40′09″E
- Operator: JR East
- Lines: Keihin-Tōhoku Line; Musashino Line
- Distance: 22.5 km (14.0 mi) to Tokyo
- Platforms: 2 island + 2 side platforms

Construction
- Structure type: At grade (Keihin-Tōhoku Line); Elevated (Musashino Line)

Other information
- Status: Staffed ("Midori no Madoguchi" )
- Station code: JK42; JM25
- Website: Official website

History
- Opened: 1 July 1961; 65 years ago

Passengers
- FY2019: 60,144 daily

Services
Preceding station	JR East	Following station
Warabi JK41 towards Yokohama	Keihin–Tōhoku Line Rapid Local	Urawa towards Ōmiya
Musashi-Urawa JM26 towards Ōmiya	Shimōsa	Higashi-Urawa JM24 towards Kaihimmakuhari
Musashi-Urawa JM26 towards Fuchūhommachi	Musashino Line	Higashi-Urawa JM24 towards Kaihimmakuhari or Tokyo
Track layout
Location
- Location within Saitama city Location within Saitama Prefecture Location within Japan

Minami-Urawa Station (南浦和駅, Minami-Urawa-eki) is a junction passenger railway station located in Minami-ku, Saitama, Saitama Prefecture, Japan, operated by East Japan Railway Company (JR East).

== Lines ==
Minami-Urawa Station is served by the Keihin-Tōhoku Line linking Saitama Prefecture with central Tokyo and Kanagawa Prefecture, and the orbital Musashino Line. Many Keihin-Tōhoku services originate and terminate at this station. The station is located 31.7 kilometers from Fuchūhommachi Station on the Musashino Line.

== Station layout ==
The station consists of two island platforms for the Keihin-Tōhoku Line, serving four tracks, with two opposed elevated side platforms for the Musashino Line located above and at a right angle to the island platforms. The station building is elevated and is located on a mezzanine level in between the two sets of platforms. The station has a Midori no Madoguchi staffed ticket office.

=== Platforms ===
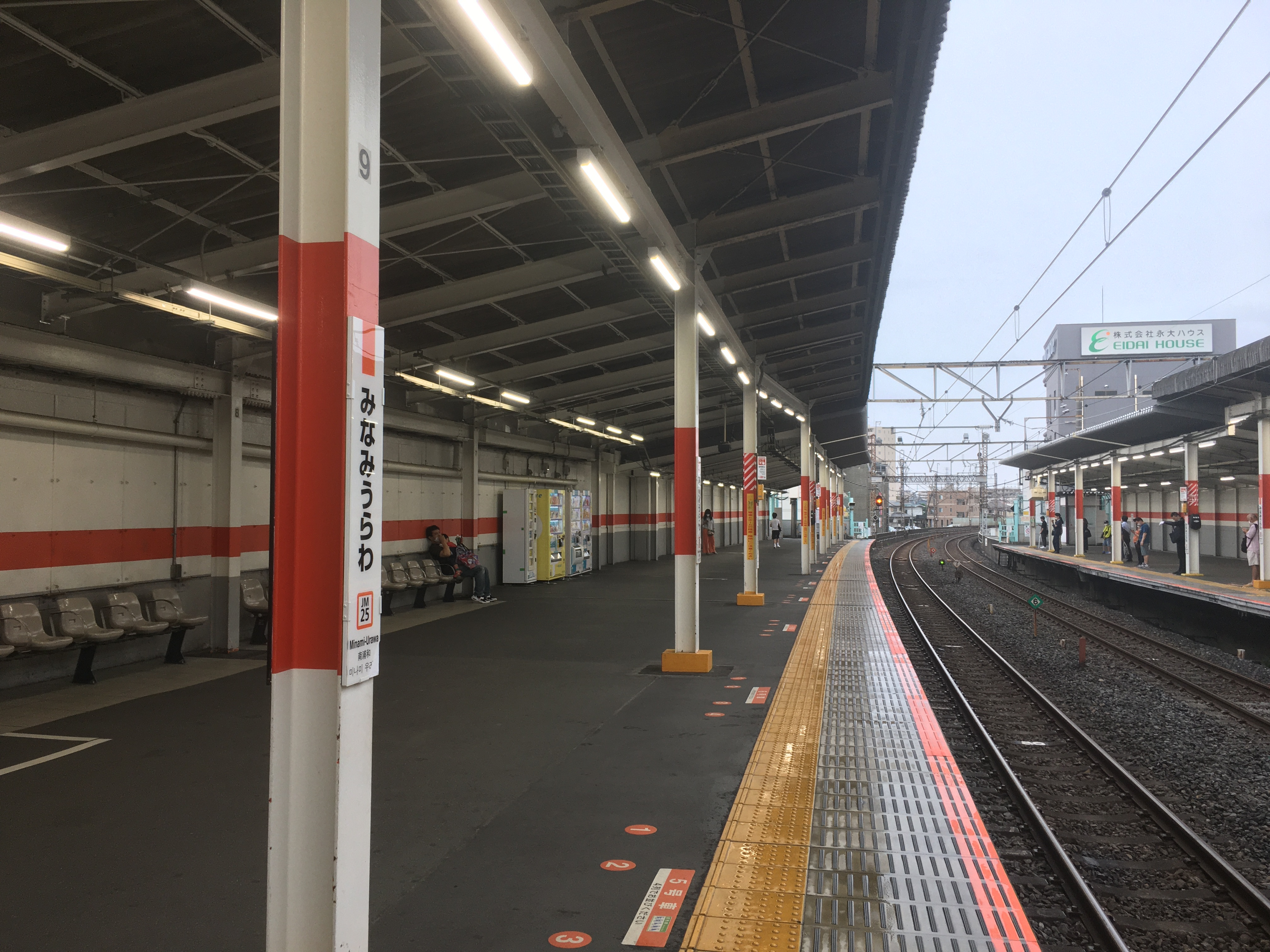
Musashino Line platforms

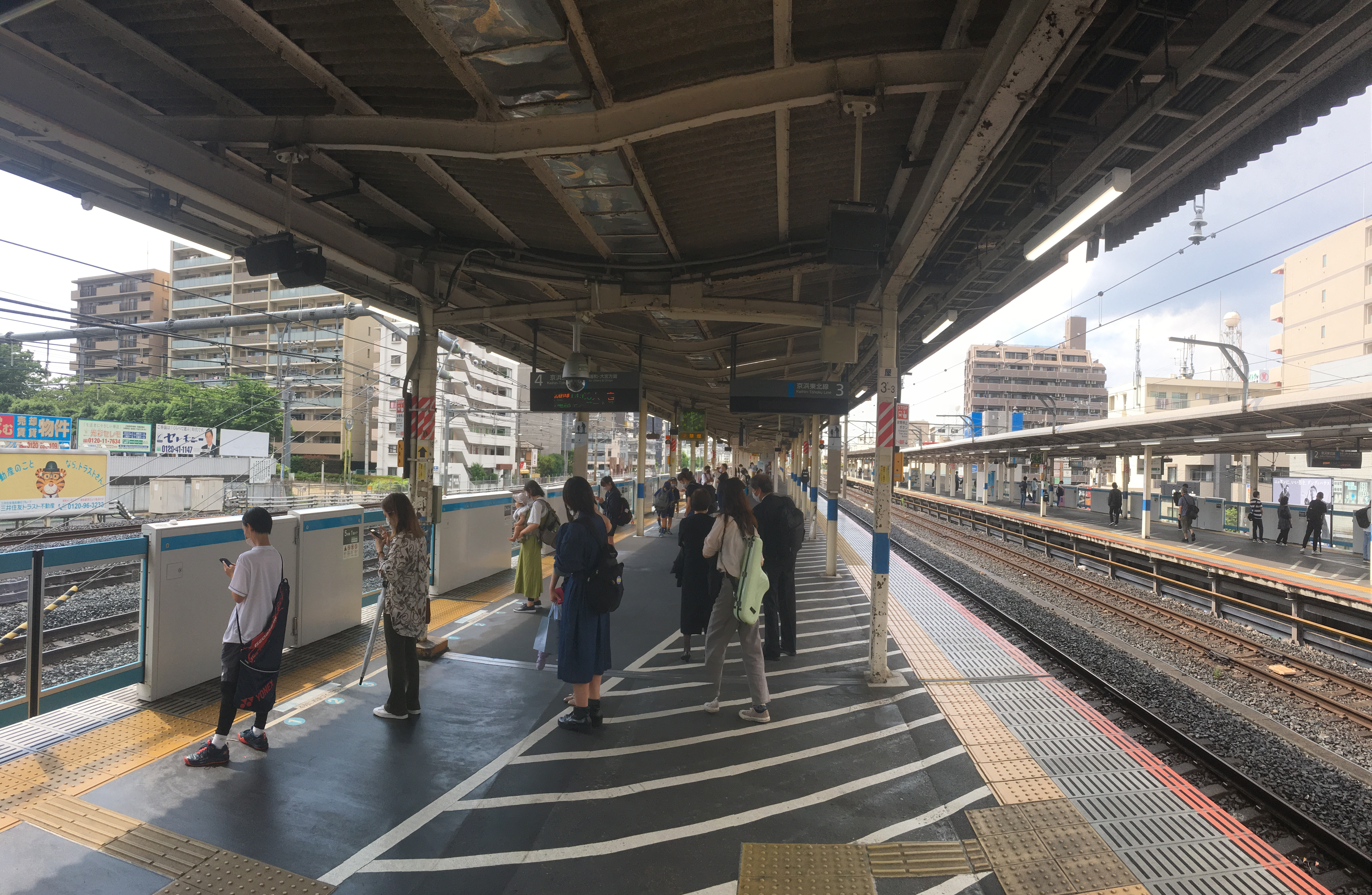
Keihin-Tohōku Line platforms

1, 2	Keihin-Tōhoku Line	for Ueno, Tokyo, Shinagawa, Yokohama, and Negishi Line for Ōfuna
3, 4	Keihin-Tōhoku Line	for Kita-Urawa, Yono, and Ōmiya
5	Musashino Line	for Kita-Asaka, Nishi-Kokubunji, and Fuchūhommachi
6	Musashino Line	for Shim-Matsudo, Nishi-Funabashi, Tokyo, and Kaihimmakuhari

== History ==
The station opened on July 1, 1961 on the Keihin-Tōhoku Line. The Musashino Line platforms opened on April 1, 1973 when passenger services on the line started. A widely reported incident occurred at the station about 9:15 a.m. on July 22, 2013, when a woman fell into the gap between a train and the edge of the platform. About 40 bystanders helped station staff push against the side of the train so that the woman could be safely extricated. A member of the station staff began pushing the train after the woman fell into the gap and bystanders quickly joined in to help with the rescue effort. The woman was not seriously injured.

== Passenger statistics ==
In fiscal 2019, the station was used by an average of 60,144 passengers daily (boarding passengers only). The passenger figures for previous years are as shown below.

Fiscal year	Daily average
2000	51,863
2005	55,624
2010	56,804
2015	58,581

== See also ==
- List of railway stations in Japan
