= Warabi Station =

Railway station in Warabi, Saitama Prefecture, Japan

JK41 Warabi Station 蕨駅
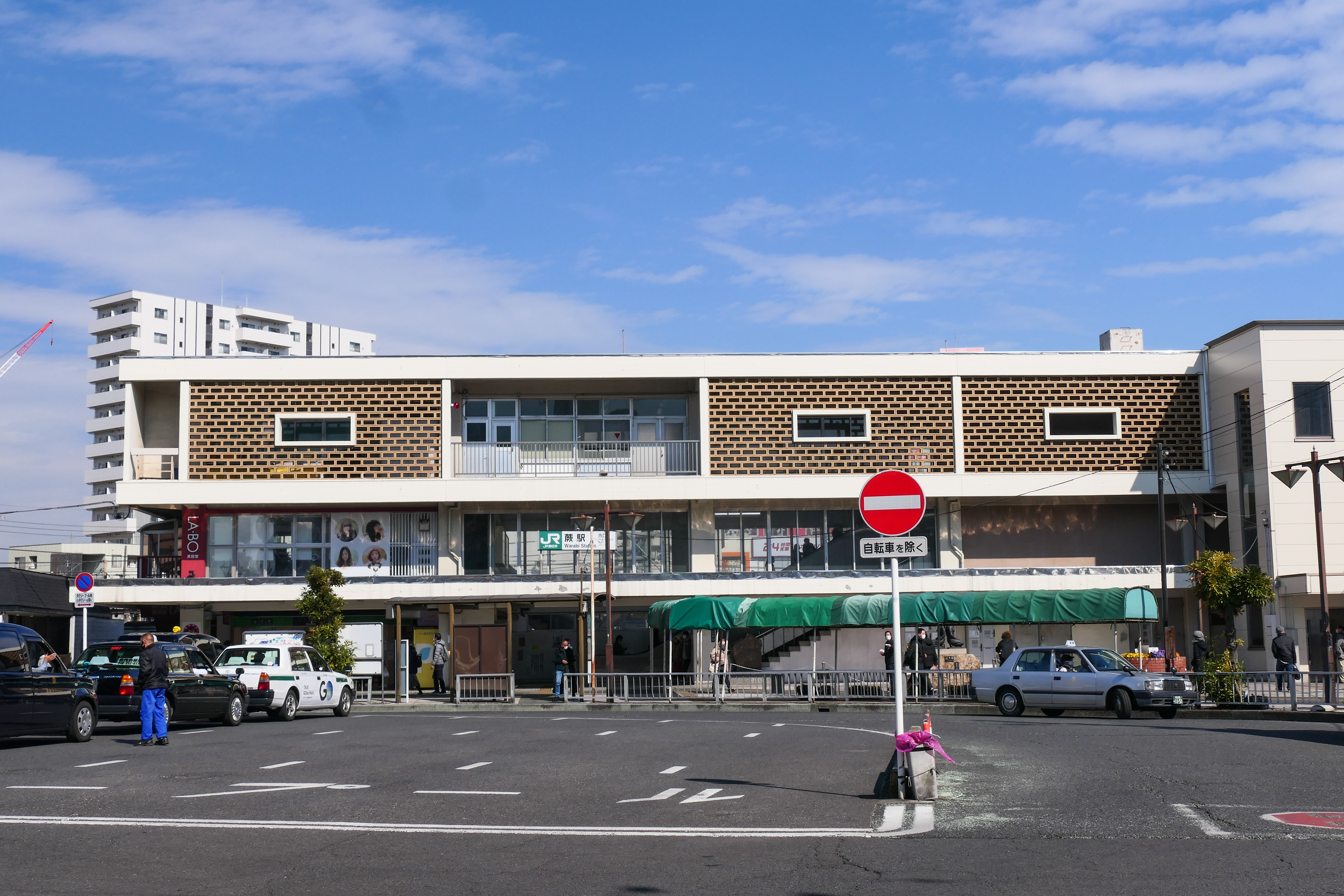
- Warabi Station west exit on 23 February 2023

General information
- Location: 1-23-1 Chuo, Warabi-shi, Saitama-ken 335-0004; Japan
- Coordinates: 35°49′41″N 139°41′26″E
- Operator: JR East
- Line: Keihin–Tōhoku Line
- Distance: 19.7 km (12.2 mi) from Tokyo
- Platforms: 1 island platform
- Tracks: 2

Construction
- Structure type: At grade

Other information
- Status: Staffed ( Midori no Madoguchi )
- Station code: JK41
- Website: Official website

History
- Opened: 16 July 1893; 133 years ago

Passengers
- FY2019: 61,829

Services
Preceding station	JR East	Following station
Nishi-Kawaguchi JK40 towards Yokohama	Keihin–Tōhoku Line Rapid Local	Minami-Urawa JK42 towards Ōmiya
Track layout
Location
- Location within Saitama Prefecture Location within Japan

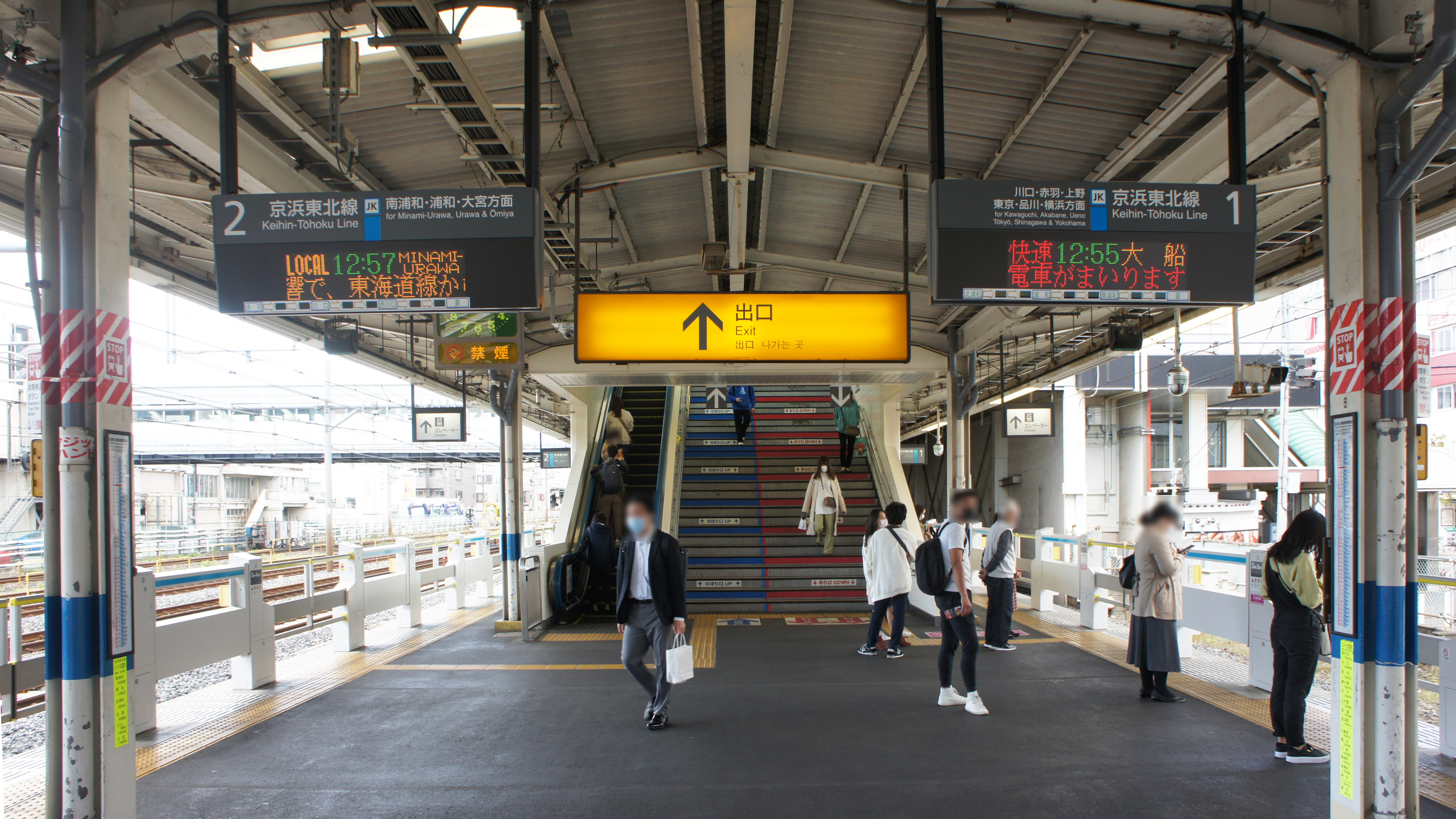
The station platforms

Warabi Station (蕨駅, Warabi-eki) is a passenger railway station located in the city of Warabi, Saitama, Japan, operated by East Japan Railway Company (JR East).

== Lines ==
Warabi Station is served by the Keihin-Tōhoku Line linking Saitama Prefecture with central Tokyo and Kanagawa Prefecture, and is located 19.7 kilometers from Tokyo Station.

== Layout ==
The station has one island platform serving two tracks, with an elevated station building.

=== Platforms ===
1	Keihin-Tohoku Line	for Ueno, Tokyo, Shinagawa, Yokohama, and Negishi Line for Ōfuna
2	Keihin-Tohoku Line	for Urawa and Ōmiya

== History ==
The station opened on 16 July 1893. With the privatization of JNR on 1 April 1987, the station came under the control of JR East.

== Passenger statistics ==
In fiscal 2019, the station was used by an average of 61,829 passengers daily (boarding passengers only).

== Surrounding area ==
- Warabi City Hall
- Warabi Post Office
- site of Warabi-shuku
- Warabi City Hospital

== See also ==
- List of railway stations in Japan
