= Nishi-Kawaguchi Station =

Railway station in Kawaguchi, Saitama Prefecture, Japan

JK40 Nishi-Kawaguchi Station 西川口駅
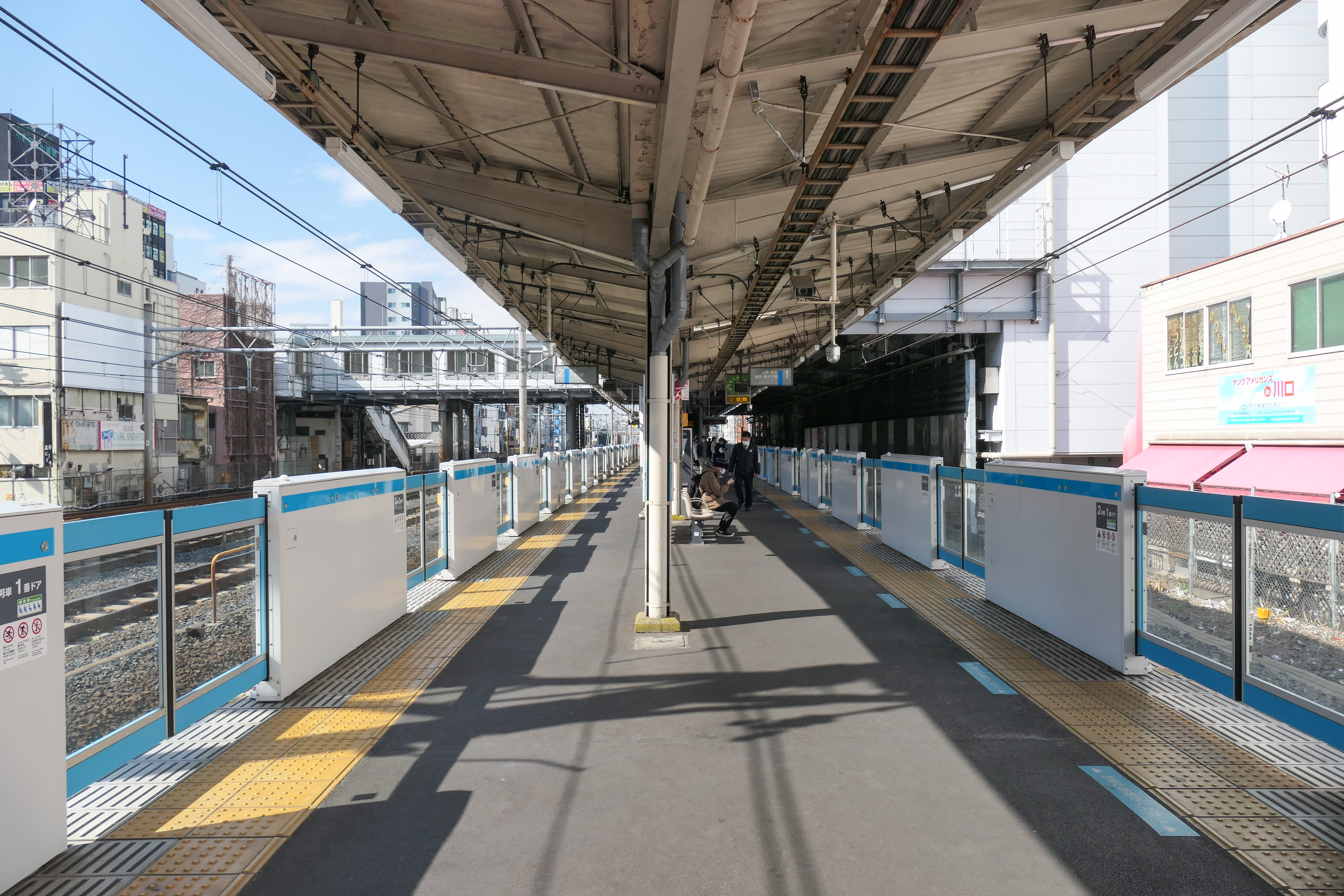
- Platforms 1 and 2 on 23 February 2023

General information
- Location: 2-20-1 Namiki, Kawaguchi-shi, Saitama-ken; Japan
- Coordinates: 35°48′57″N 139°42′16″E
- Operator: JR East
- Line: ■ Keihin-Tohoku Line
- Distance: 17.8 km from Tokyo
- Platforms: 1 island platform

Other information
- Status: Staffed
- Website: Official website

History
- Opened: 1 September 1954

Passengers
- FY2019: 59,062

Services
Preceding station	JR East	Following station
Kawaguchi JK39 towards Yokohama	Keihin–Tōhoku Line Rapid Local	Warabi JK41 towards Ōmiya
Location
- Location within Saitama Prefecture Location within Japan

Nishi-Kawaguchi Station (西川口駅, Nishi-Kawaguchi-eki) is a passenger railway station located in the city of Kawaguchi, Saitama, Japan, operated by the East Japan Railway Company (JR East).

== Lines ==
Nishi-Kawaguchi Station is served by the Keihin-Tōhoku Line linking Saitama Prefecture with central Tokyo and Kanagawa Prefecture, and is located 17.8 kilometers from Tokyo Station.

== Layout ==
The station has one island platform serving two tracks, with an elevated station building. The station is staffed.

=== Platforms ===
1	Keihin-Tohoku Line	for Ueno, Tokyo, Shinagawa, Yokohama, and Negishi Line for Ōfuna
2	Keihin-Tohoku Line	for Urawa and Ōmiya

== History ==
The station opened on 1 September 1954. With the privatization of JNR on 1 April 1987, the station came under the control of JR East.

== Passenger statistics ==
In fiscal 2019, the station was used by an average of 59,062 passengers daily (boarding passengers only).

== Surrounding area ==
- Kawaguchi City Industrial Culture Center
- Kawaguchi City High School
- Bunan Junior and Senior High School
- Saitama Prefectural Kawaguchi Technical High School

== See also ==
- List of railway stations in Japan
