= Mass media in Saitama Prefecture =

This article lists and describes the features of mass media based in Saitama Prefecture of Japan. Most are based in the capital and most populous city, Saitama City's Urawa ward. Unless mentioned otherwise the language is Japanese.

Like other parts of Kantō region incorporating the Greater Tokyo Area, media based in Tokyo dominate the attention of the residents. Tokyo's major radio and television stations are licensed to cover the whole Kantō region. See Japanese media for them. They have larger readership or rates than the locally based media.

== Newspapers ==
The below are about paid daily newspapers. There are less frequently published community papers and magazines.

- The Saitama Shimbun (ja:埼玉新聞, Saitama Shinbun) is headquartered in Urawa-ku, Saitama. It has strong readership among local governments, their suppliers and employees.

Major national daily general newspapers Yomiuri, Asahi, Mainichi, Sankei, and the metropolitan paper Tokyo Shimbun have branch offices and correspondents in the prefecture. Prefecture or area-specific pages are inserted in those wide-area papers.

== Broadcasting ==
The below are stations whose licensed area of coverage is the whole or the most of Saitama Prefecture.

=== Television ===
- Teletama or Television Saitama (analogue ch38, digital ch32) is a commercial station headquartered in Urawa-ku, Saitama and serves the prefecture.
- NHK the national public broadcaster has NHK Saitama Broadcasting Station (NHKさいたま放送局, NHK Saitama Hōsō-kyoku) in Urawa-ku, Saitama. It has a news gathering base and a television studio but they are to feed contents for programming produced in Tokyo.

=== Radio ===
==== Prefectural service ====
- FM NACK5 (エフエムナックファイブ, Efu-emu Nakku-faibu) (FM 79.5 MHz, Chichibu relay 77.5 MHz) is a commercial station headquartered in Ōmiya-ku, Saitama.
- NHK Saitama FM (NHKさいたまFM, Enu-eichi-kei Saitama efu-emu) (85.1 MHz, Chichibu relay 83.5 MHz) transmits some scheduled programming produced in Urawa-ku, Saitama to insert between ones produced in Tokyo.

==== Community service ====
- FM Urawa (nicknamed Reds Wave, FM 78.3 MHz) in Urawa-ku, Saitama, Flower Radio (FM 76.7 MHz) in Kōnosu and FM-Chappy (FM 77.7 MHz) in Iruma, Smile FM in Asaka (FM 76.7 MHz) are community stations.

=== Other services ===
Broadcasting services that may be available but are not limited to Saitama include:

- Cable television and cable radio are available in many areas in the prefecture. They often have non-Japanese channels and / or programs. They occasionally broadcast locally produced programs. See ja:ケーブルテレビ局の一覧#埼玉県 and ja:有線ラジオ放送 for the list.
- InterFM, a multilingual commercial station (FM 76.1 MHz) based in Tokyo officially serves Saitama City also.
- Tokyo's major radio and television stations which are licensed to cover the whole Kantō region. See Japanese media for them. The television stations offer English interpretation upon some news programs.
- Japanese domestic satellite television, satellite radio MobaHo! and shortwave Radio Nikkei are meant to cover whole Japan. The former two offer channels in languages other than Japanese.
- The Open University of Japan broadcasting on television and radio in Japanese, produced in Chiba city.
- Stations based in and intended to cover nearby prefectures. These include American Forces Network (810 kHz) English language AM radio transmitted from Wakō, Saitama.
