= Minami-ku, Saitama =

Minami-ku, Saitama 南区
- Ward
- Minami Ward
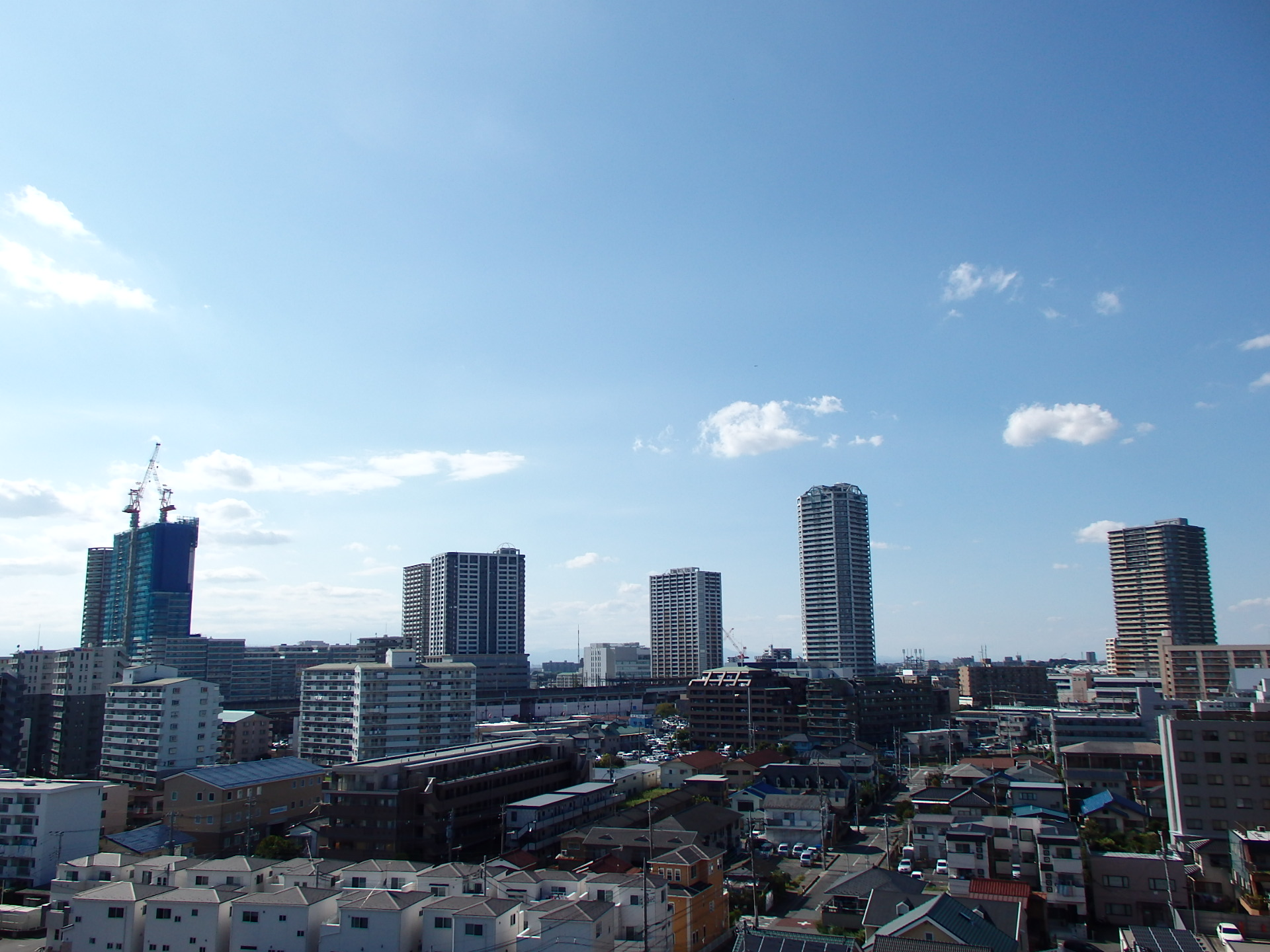
- Minami-ku skyline near Musashi-Urawa Station

- Logo
- Interactive map of Minami-ku, Saitama
- Location in Japan
- Coordinates: 35°50′42″N 139°38′43″E
- Country: Japan
- Region: Kantō
- Prefecture: Saitama
- City: Saitama

Area
  - Total: 13.82 km^{2} (5.34 sq mi)

Population (March 2021)
  - Total: 192,143
  - Density: 13,900/km^{2} (36,010/sq mi)
- Time zone: UTC+9 (Japan Standard Time)
- -Flower: Sunflower
- Phone number: 048-835-3156
- Address: 7-20 Bessho, Minami-ku, Saitama-shi, Saitama-ken 338-0002
- Website: Official website

Minami-ku (南区, Minami-ku) is one of ten wards of the city of Saitama, in Saitama Prefecture, Japan, and is located in the southern part of the city. As of 1 March 2021, the ward had an estimated population of 192,143 and a population density of 14,000 persons per km^{2}. Its total area was 13.82 square kilometres (5.34 sq mi).

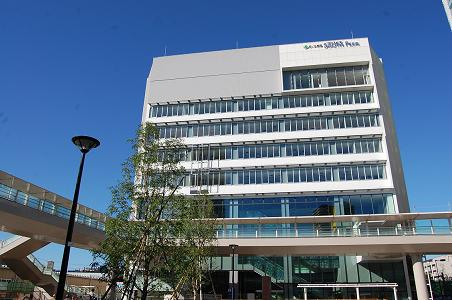
Minami Ward Office, Saitama City

== Geography ==
Minami Ward is within the Kantō Plain, with a minimum altitude of 2.9 meters and maximum altitude of 16.9 meters above sea level. The Arakawa River and several others drain the area. Minami Ward has three bodies of water: Besshonuma, Shirahatanuma, and Saiko. Approximately 56% of the area was of the ward is residential area and less than 5% was rural; consequently the entire ward was designated a "densely inhabited district" (DID) in 2005.

=== Neighboring Municipalities ===
Saitama Prefecture

- Sakura-ku
- Urawa-ku
- Chūō-ku
- Midori-ku
- Kawaguchi
- Warabi
- Toda
- Asaka

== History ==
The villages of Mutsuji, Yada, Tsuchiai and Miyamoto were created within Kitaadachi District, Saitama with the establishment of the municipalities system on April 1, 1889. On April 1, 1932, Yada and the village of Kisaki (also from Kitaadachi District) were annexed by Urawa Town. On February 11, 1934, Urawa was raised to city status. Mutsuji was elevated to town status on 1938 and was annexed by Urawa on April 1, 1942. In 1943, Miyamoto merged with the neighboring village of Sasame and was renamed Misasa. On January 1, 1955, the village of Tsuchiai and the village of Okubo (also from Kitaadachi District) were annexed by Urawa. In 1957, the village of Misasa was merged with the town of Toda, but due to strong local opposition, most of the village was transferred to Urawa in 1959. On May 1, 2001, the cities of Urawa, Yono and Ōmiya merged to form the new city of Saitama. When Saitama was proclaimed a designated city in 2003, the much area of corresponding to former villages of Mutsuji, Yada, Tsuchiai and Miyasasa became Minami Ward.

== Education ==
- Minami-ku has 14 elementary schools, six junior high schools, and four high schools.

Municipal junior high schools:

- Kishi (岸中学校)
- Minami Urawa (南浦和中学校)
- Oyaba (大谷場中学校)
- Oyaguchi (大谷口中学校)
- Shirahata (白幡中学校)
- Uchiya (内谷中学校)

Municipal elementary schools:

- Buzo (文蔵小学校)
- Minami Urawa (南浦和小学校)
- Mukai (向小学校)
- Nishi Urawa (西浦和小学校)
- Numakage (沼影小学校)
- Oyaba (大谷場小学校)
- Oyaba Higashi (大谷場東小学校)
- Oyaguchi (大谷口小学校)
- Tsuji (辻小学校)
- Tsuji Minami (辻南小学校)
- Urawa Bessho (浦和別所小学校)
- Urawa Osato (浦和大里小学校)
- Yada (谷田小学校)
- Zenmae (善前小学校)

== Transportation ==
=== Railway ===
JR East – Musashino Line

- Musashi-Urawa - Minami-Urawa

JR East – Keihin Tohoku Line

- Minami-Urawa

JR East – Saikyo Line

- Musashi-Urawa - Naka-Urawa

=== Highway ===
- Tokyo Gaikan Expressway
- Shuto Expressway Ōmiya Route
- National Route 17
- National Route 298

== Local attractions ==
Many facilities are located in Minami-ku. The city has a culture center. There are two public parks, a horse-racing track, and a swimming pool, which in winter serves as a skating rink. Minami-ku is home to Lotte Urawa Stadium, second home field of the Chiba Lotte Marines baseball team. A theme park, Musashi Urawa Ramen Academy, is in the ward.
