= Yono Station =

Railway station in Saitama, Japan

JK45 Yono Station 与野駅
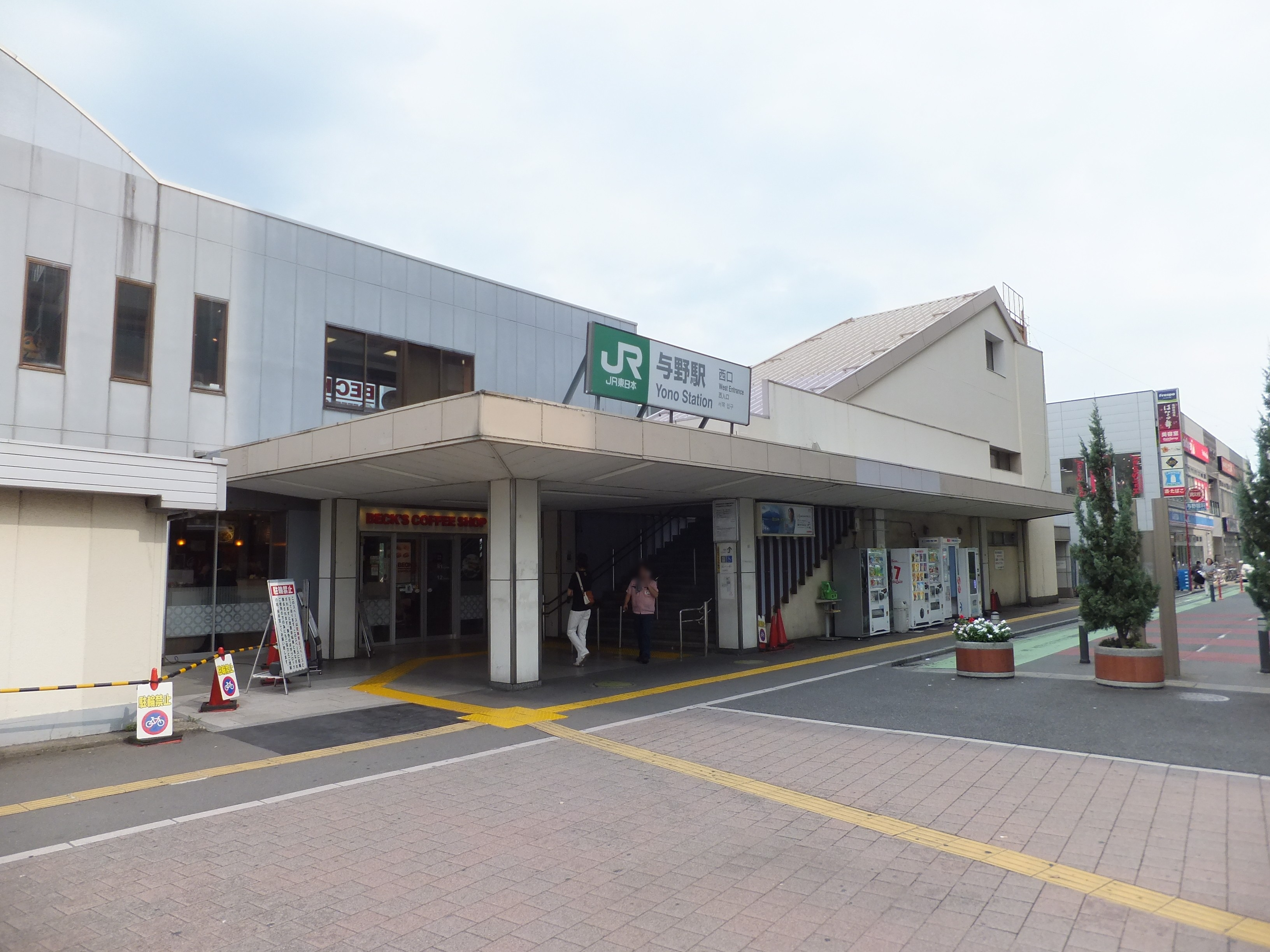
- Yono Station in September 2013

General information
- Location: 1-1-1 Kamikizaki, Urawa-ku, Saitama-shi, Saitama-ken 330-0071; Japan
- Coordinates: 35°53′04″N 139°38′20″E
- Operator: JR East
- Line: Keihin–Tōhoku Line
- Distance: 27.6 km (17.1 mi) from Tokyo
- Platforms: 1 island platform
- Tracks: 2

Construction
- Structure type: At grade

Other information
- Status: Staffed
- Station code: JK45
- Website: Official website

History
- Opened: 1 November 1912; 113 years ago

Passengers
- FY2019: 26,802

Services
Preceding station	JR East	Following station
Kita-Urawa JK44 towards Yokohama	Keihin–Tōhoku Line Rapid Local	Saitama-Shintoshin JK46 towards Ōmiya
Location
- Location within Saitama Prefecture Location within Japan

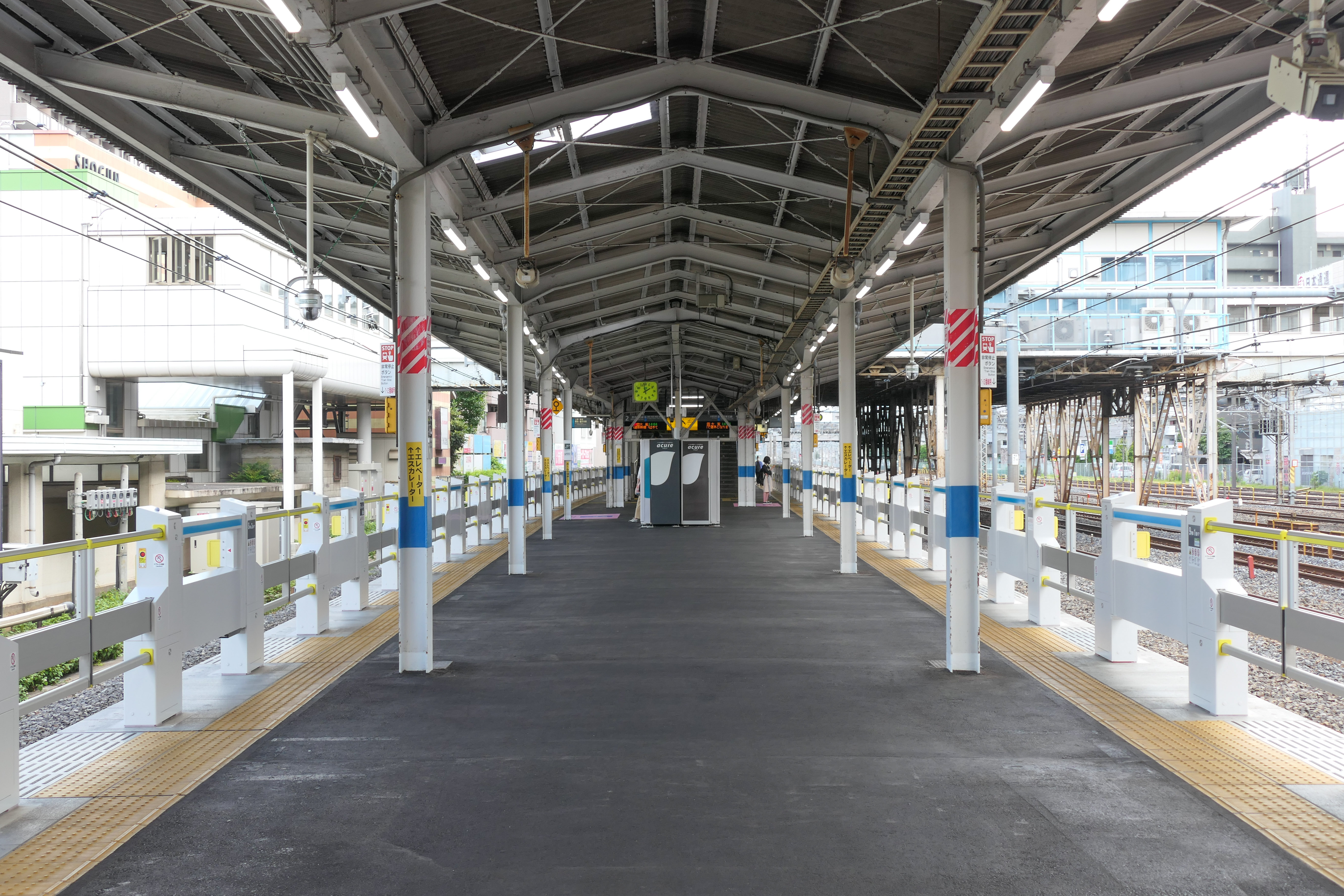
JR Yono Station Platform

Yono Station (与野駅, Yono eki) is a passenger railway station on the Keihin-Tohoku Line in Urawa-ku, Saitama, Saitama Prefecture, Japan, operated by East Japan Railway Company (JR East).

== Lines ==
Yono Station is served by the Keihin-Tōhoku Line and is 2.7 kilometers from Ōmiya and 27.6 kilometers from Tokyo.

== Layout ==
The station has one island platform serving two tracks, connected by a footbridge to the elevated station building. The station is staffed.

=== Platforms ===
1	Keihin-Tōhoku Line	for Saitama-Shintoshin and Ōmiya
2	Keihin-Tōhoku Line	for Urawa, Ueno, Tokyo, Shinagawa, Yokohama and Ōfuna

== History ==
The station opened on 1 November 1912. The station became part of the JR East network after the privatization of the JNR on 1 April 1987.

== Passenger statistics ==
In fiscal 2019, the station was used by an average of 26,802 passengers daily (boarding passengers only).

== Surrounding area ==
- Saitama City Chuo-ku Ward Office
- Urawanishi High School

== See also ==
- List of railway stations in Japan
