= Saitama-Shintoshin Station =

Railway station in Saitama, Japan

JK46 JU06 Saitama-Shintoshin Station さいたま新都心駅
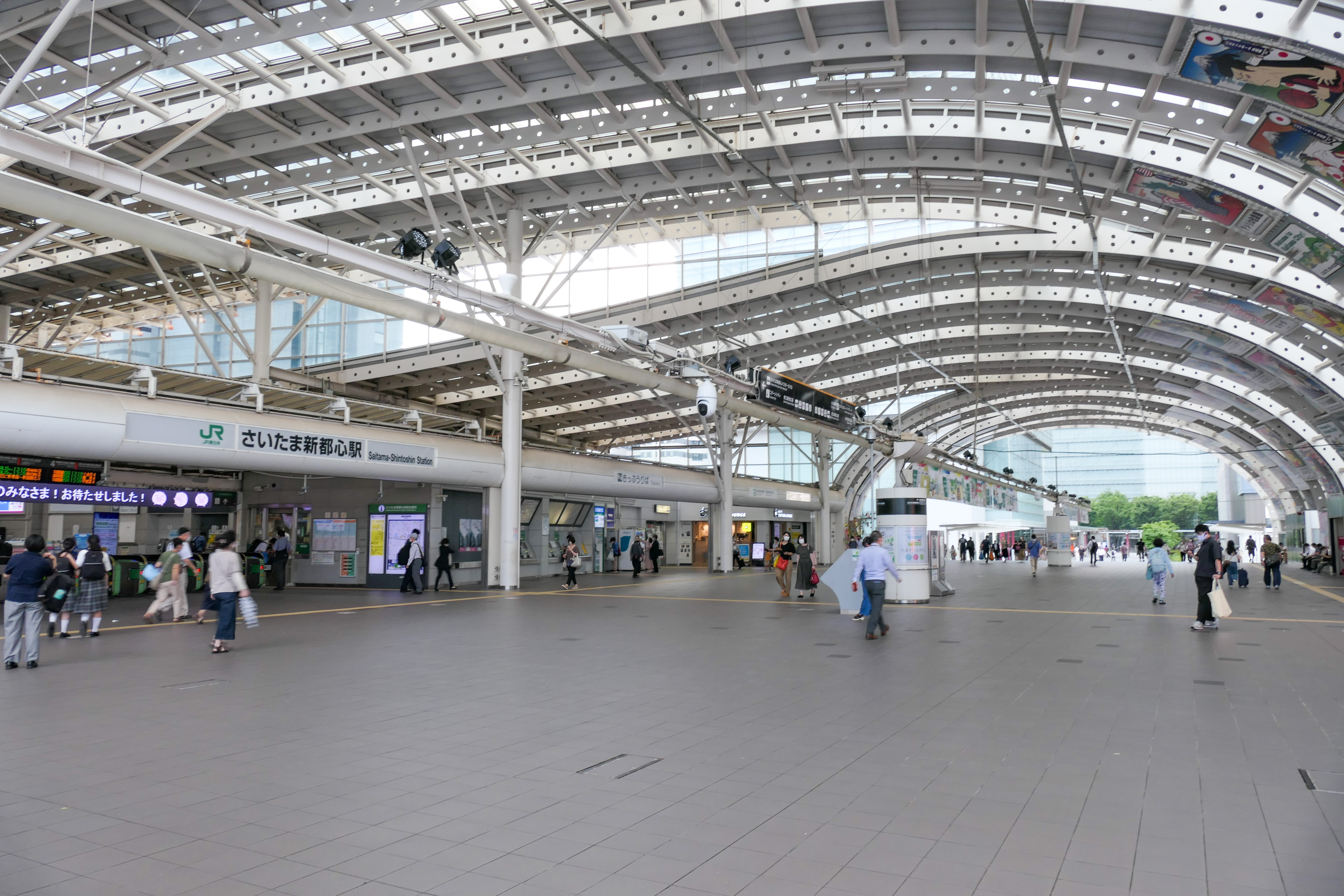
- The station entrance in July 2021

General information
- Location: 4 Kishiki-chō, Ōmiya-ku, Saitama-shi, Saitama-ken 330-0843; Japan
- Coordinates: 35°53′38″N 139°38′01″E
- Operator: JR East
- Line: Tōhoku Main Line
- Distance: 28.7 km from Tokyo
- Platforms: 2 island platforms
- Tracks: 2
- Connections: Bus stop

Other information
- Status: staffed (Midori no Madoguchi )
- Website: Official website

History
- Opened: 1 April 2000; 26 years ago

Passengers
- FY2019: 55,782 daily

Services
Preceding station	JR East	Following station
Yono JK45 towards Yokohama	Keihin–Tōhoku Line Rapid Local	Ōmiya Terminus
Urawa towards Tokyo	Utsunomiya / Takasaki lines Local	Ōmiya towards Kuroiso or Maebashi
Location
- Location within Japan Location within Saitama Prefecture Location within Japan

Saitama-Shintoshin Station (さいたま新都心駅, Saitama-Shintoshin-eki; lit. "Saitama New Urban Center Station") is a passenger railway station located in Ōmiya-ku, Saitama, Saitama Prefecture, Japan, operated by East Japan Railway Company (JR East).

== Lines ==
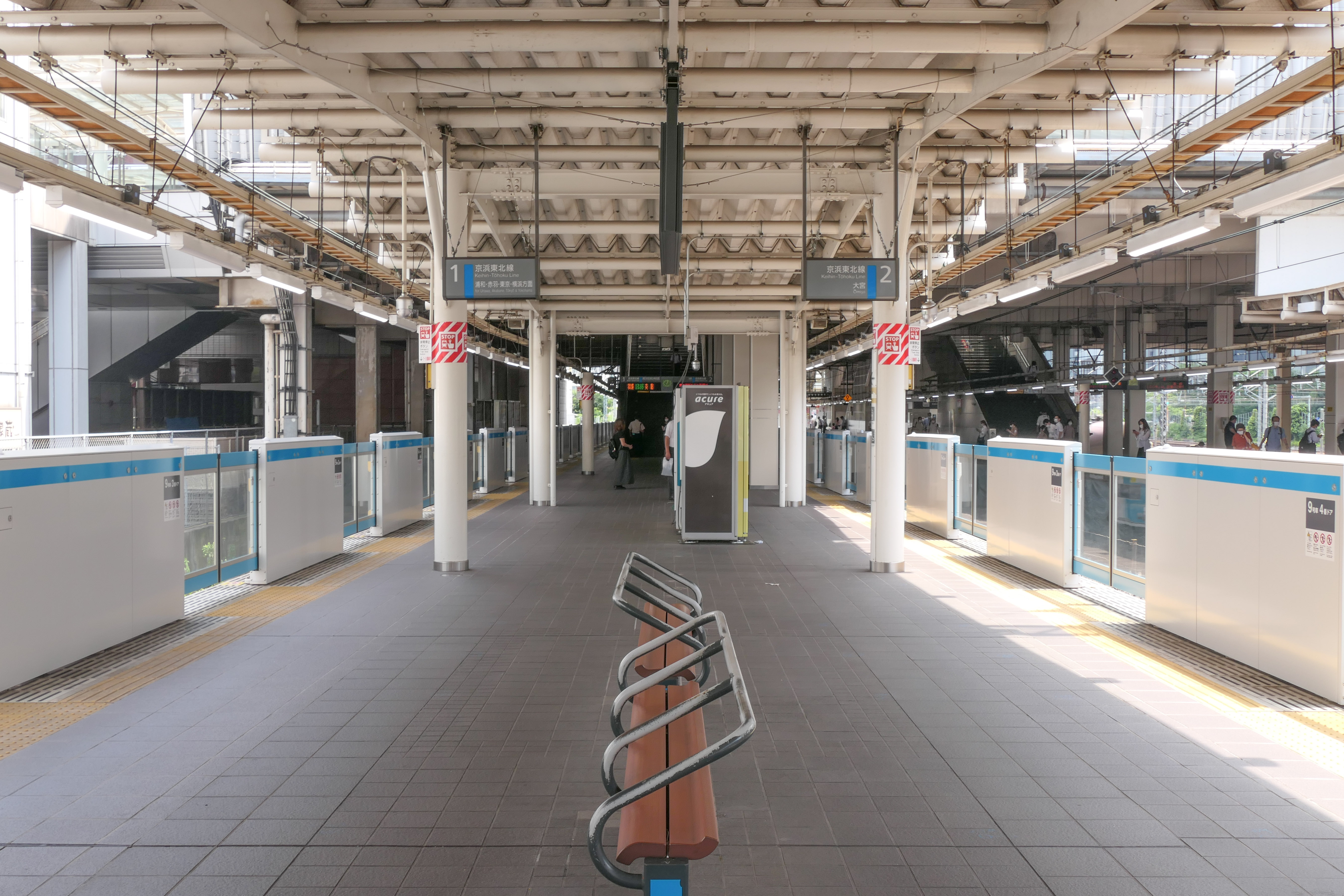
The platforms in July 2021

Saitama-Shintoshin Station is served by the Keihin–Tōhoku Line, Takasaki Line, and Tohoku Main Line (Utsunomiya Line), and lies 28.7 km (17.8 mi) from Tokyo Station.

== Station layout ==
This station has and elevated station building with two ground-level island platforms serving four tracks. The station has a Midori no Madoguchi ticket office.

=== Platforms ===
1	Keihin–Tohoku Line	for Ueno, Tokyo, Shinagawa, Yokohama, and Negishi Line for Ōfuna
2	Keihin–Tohoku Line	for Ōmiya
3	Utsunomiya Line (Ueno–Tokyo Line)	for Ueno, Tokyo, Yokohama, Ōfuna, Atami, Numazu and Ito (via Tōkaidō Line and Ito Line)
3	Takasaki Line (Ueno–Tokyo Line)	for Ueno, Tokyo, Yokohama, Ōfuna, Atami, Numazu and Itō (via Tōkaidō Line and Itō Line)
4	Utsunomiya Line	for Ōmiya, Oyama, Utsunomiya, and Kuroiso
4	Takasaki Line	for Ōmiya, Kumagaya and Takasaki

Platform edge doors are scheduled to be installed on the Keihin-Tohoku Line platforms (1 and 2) in 2017, being brought into service on 23 September 2017.

== History ==
The station opened on 1 April 2000. Due to not having dedicated platforms for the services, Shōnan–Shinjuku Line trains do not stop at Saitama-Shintoshin.

== Passenger statistics ==
In fiscal 2019, the JR station was used by an average of 55,782 passengers daily (boarding passengers only). The passenger figures for previous years are as shown below.

Fiscal year	Daily average
2000	15,033
2005	35,874
2010	39,090
2015	48,371

== Surrounding area ==
- Saitama New Urban Center
- Saitama Super Arena
- Cocoon City shopping centre

== Bus services ==
There is a direct express bus service to and from Narita Airport.

== See also ==
- List of railway stations in Japan
