= Urawa-ku =

Urawa-ku, Saitama 浦和区
- Ward
- Urawa Ward
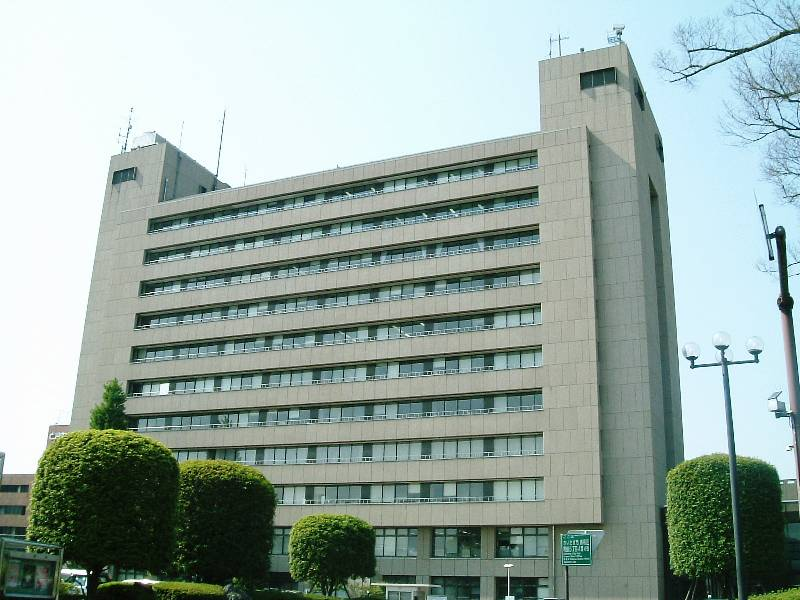
- Saitama City Hall

- Seal

- Location of Urawa-ku in Saitama

- Coordinates: 35°51′41.8″N 139°38′43.8″E
- Country: Japan
- Region: Kantō
- Prefecture: Saitama
- City: Saitama

Area
  - Total: 11.51 km^{2} (4.44 sq mi)

Population (March 2021)
  - Total: 166,322
  - Density: 14,450/km^{2} (37,430/sq mi)
- Time zone: UTC+9 (Japan Standard Time)
- Flower: Catharanthus roseus
- Phone number: 048-835-3156
- Address: 6-4-1 Tokiwa, Urawa-ku, Saitama-shi, Saitama-ken 330-0586
- Website: Official website

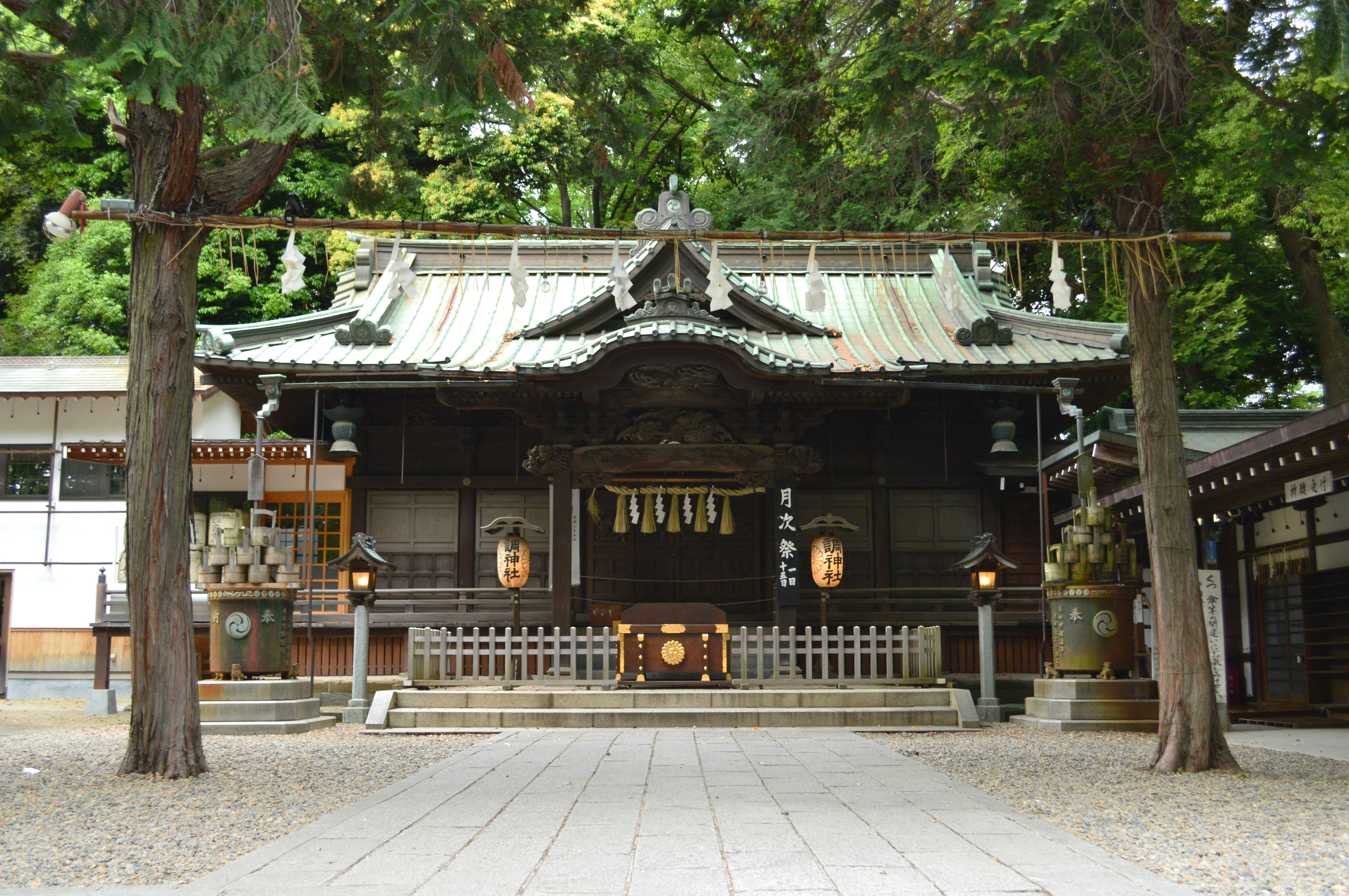
Tsuki-jinja

Urawa (浦和区, Urawa-ku) is one of ten wards of the city of Saitama, in Saitama Prefecture, Japan. Located in the northeast of the city, Urawa is the governmental center of Saitama and houses most of the city's administrative offices including the city hall, as well as the offices of Saitama Prefectural government. Also, there are several newspaper branch offices and three broadcasting stations.

== Geography ==
Urawa Ward is within the Ōmiya Plateau of the Kantō plain, in the south-central portion of Saitama City.

=== Neighboring Municipalities ===
Urawa-ku is surrounded by Midori-ku (to the east), Minami-ku (south), Chūō-ku (west), Ōmiya-ku (north), and Minuma-ku (northeast) of Saitama city.

== History ==
In the Edo period, Urawa-ku flourished as Urawa-shuku, a post station on the Nakasendō highway, which connected Edo with Kyoto. Following the Meiji restoration, Urawa Prefecture was established, and in 1871 merged with Iwatsuki, Urawa, and Oshi Prefectures merged to form Saitama Prefecture, and Urawa as the capital. The modern town of Urawa was officially created within Kitaadachi District, Saitama with the establishment of the municipalities system on April 1, 1889.

After the 1923 Great Kantō earthquake many intellectuals, especially painters, moved to Urawa from Tokyo, Yokohama, and other cities in southern Kantō region. In 1932, Urawa annexed the neighboring villages of Yada and Kisaki, and was elevated to city status on February 11, 1934. Urawa expanded further by annexing the villages of Omagi and Mimuro on April 17, 1940 and town of Mutsuji on April 1, 1942. During World War II, Urawa was bombed twice by Allied forces in April and May 1945.

Urawa continued to expand after the end of the war, absorbing the villages of Tsuchiai and Okubo on January 1, 1955 and part of the town of Toda on April 1, 1959 and part of the village of Misono on May 1, 1962.

On May 1, 2001 Urawa merged with Ōmiya and Yono to form Saitama City. In April 2003 Saitama became a city designated by government ordinance, and now the area of former Urawa City was divided between Sakura-ku, Urawa-ku, Minami-ku, and Midori-ku.

== Demographics ==
As of 1 March 2021, the ward had an estimated population of 166,322 and a population density of 14,000 persons per km^{2}. Its total area was 11.51 square kilometres (4.44 sq mi).

Urawa has the second largest population of any ward in Saitama, only behind Minami-ku. The population density is the highest of all the city's wards. As of 2013, the proportion of households with an annual income of 10 million yen (about $102,459) about or more is 15.3%. This is 13th largest of any city ward or municipality in Japan.

As of 2010, university graduates account for 43.4% of the population age 25 or older. This ranks 15th in Japan.

== Education ==
Urawa-ku has 12 elementary schools, five junior high schools, and six high schools.

The City of Saitama operates Urawashi Junior and Senior High School (浦和中学校・高等学校).

Public junior high schools:

- Kizaki (木崎中学校)
- Motobuto (本太中学校)
- Ohara (大原中学校)
- Tokiwa (常盤中学校)
- Urawa Junior and Senior High School (浦和中学校・高等学校)

Municipal elementary schools:

- Daito (大東小学校)
- Harigaya (針ヶ谷小学校)
- Kami Kizaki (上木崎小学校)
- Kishicho (岸町小学校)
- Kita Urawa (北浦和小学校)
- Kizaki (木崎小学校)
- Motobuto (本太小学校)
- Nakacho (仲町小学校)
- Nakamoto (仲本小学校)
- Takasogo (高砂小学校)
- Tokiwa (常盤小学校)
- Tokiwa Kita (常盤北小学校)

The Embassy of South Korea in Tokyo maintains the Korea Education Institution (Korean: 사이타마한국교육원, Japanese: 埼玉韓国教育院) in Urawa Ward.

== Transportation ==
=== Railway ===
– Tohoku Main Line / Takasaki Line

- Urawa

– Keihin Tohoku Line

- Urawa - Kita-Urawa – Yono

=== Highway ===
- National Route 17
- National Route 463

=== Bus ===
- Tobu Bus West
- Seibu Bus
- International Kyogo Bus

== Local attractions ==
- The Urawa Red Diamonds football (soccer) club in the J. League, arguably the biggest club in Japan and in Asia called the city home after strong support from its citizens. Although its official hometown recognized by the league is whole Saitama city and it is now the club is headquartered in Saitama Stadium in Midori-ku, the hometown support are strong in the area of former Urawa city. When the team has a match at Urawa Komaba Stadium in Urawa-ku or Saitama Stadium, the town becomes more and more crowded with the supporters.
