= Keihin–Tōhoku Line =

Railway line in Japan

Keihin-Tōhoku Line

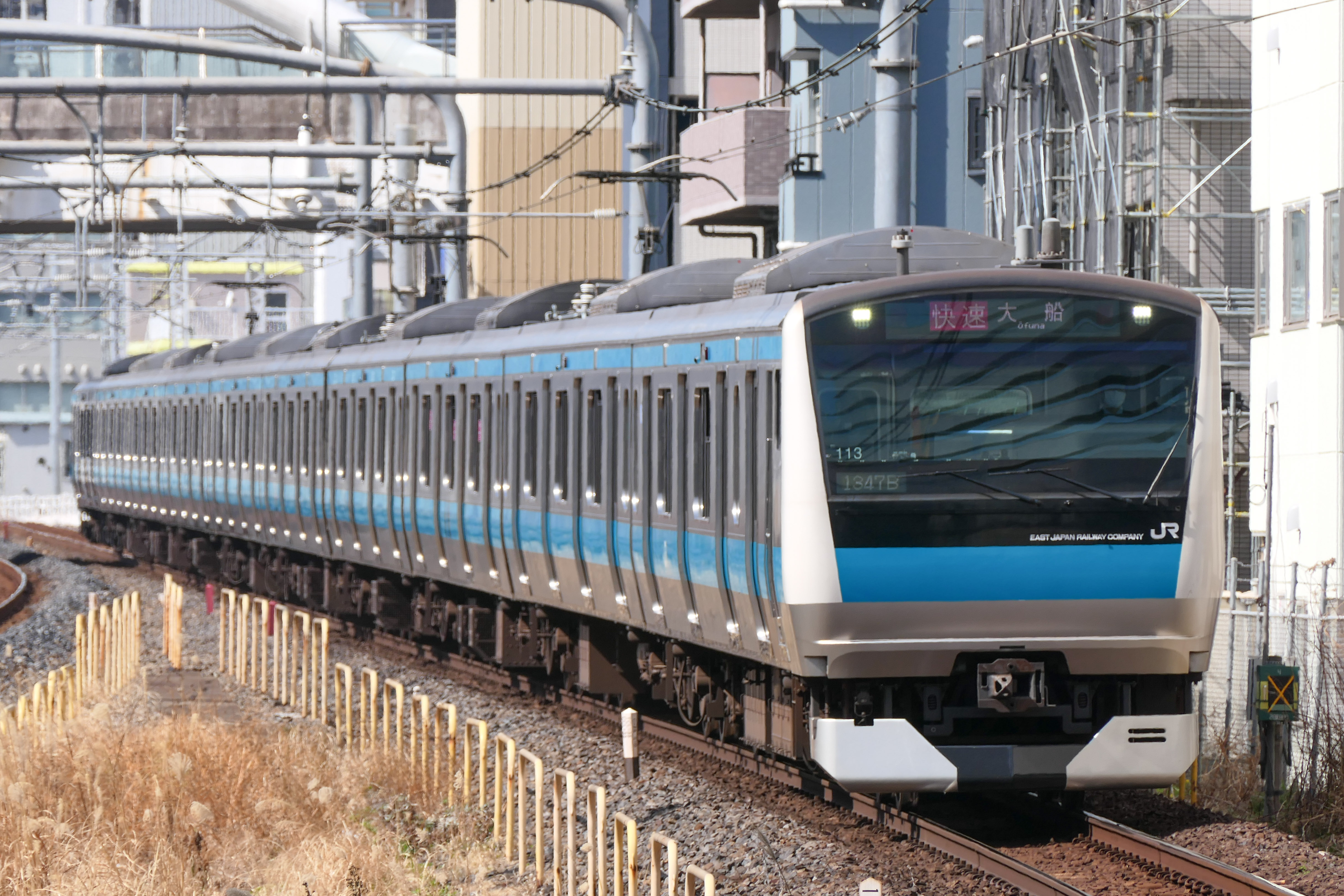
- JR East E233 series EMU at Saitama-Shintoshin Station

Overview
- Native name: 京浜東北線
- Status: In service
- Owner: East Japan Railway Company
- Line number: JK
- Locale: Tokyo, Saitama, Kanagawa prefectures
- Termini: Yokohama; Ōmiya
- Stations: 36
- Color on map: Light blue

Service
- Type: Commuter rail
- Operator: East Japan Railway Company
- Depot: Saitama
- Rolling stock: E233-1000 series
- Daily ridership: 2,974,504 (daily 2015)

History
- Opened: 20 December 1914; 111 years ago

Technical
- Line length: 59.1 km (36.7 mi)
- Number of tracks: Double-track
- Track gauge: 1,067 mm (3 ft 6 in)
- Electrification: Overhead line, 1,500 V DC
- Operating speed: 90 km/h (55 mph)
Route map

The Keihin–Tōhoku Line (Japanese: 京浜東北線, Hepburn: Keihin-tōhoku-sen) is a railway line in Japan which connects the cities of Saitama, Kawaguchi, Tokyo, Kawasaki, and Yokohama. It is part of the East Japan Railway Company (JR East) network. The line's name is derived from the characters for Tokyo (東京), Yokohama (横浜) and the Tōhoku Main Line (東北本線). The line runs parallel with the Tōkaidō Main Line between Yokohama and Tokyo and the Utsunomiya Line (part of the Tōhoku Main Line) except between Ueno and Akabane stations where the two lines are physically separate and thus alternate routes.

Most Keihin–Tōhoku Line trains run through onto the Negishi Line between Yokohama and Ōfuna stations. As a result, the entire service between Ōmiya and Ōfuna is typically referred to as the Keihin–Tōhoku–Negishi Line (京浜東北・根岸線) on system maps and in-train station guides. Keihin–Tōhoku–Negishi Line trains are recognizable by their light blue stripe (the line's color on maps is also light blue).

== Service outline ==
Trains run every 2–3 minutes at peak hours, every 5–6 minutes during the daytime, and less frequently the rest of the time. In general, these trains are classified as "Local" (各駅停車, Kakueki-Teisha), stopping at all stations en route. However, all trains in the daytime (10:30–15:30) are classified as "Rapid" (快速, kaisoku). These rapid trains skip some stations in central Tokyo, where the Keihin–Tōhoku Line runs parallel to the Yamanote Line.

== Station list ==
- Local trains stop at all stations. Rapid trains stop at stations marked "●" and "■". (Stations marked "■" allow cross-platform transfers to the Yamanote Line). Additionally, stations marked "▲" are served by rapid trains on weekends and national holidays only.

=== Keihin–Tōhoku Line ===
Line	No.	Station	Distance in km			Rapid	Transfers	Location	
Line	No.	Station	Between stations	From Ōmiya	From Tokyo	Rapid	Transfers	Location	
Tōhoku		Ōmiya 大宮	—N/a	0 (0)	30.3 (18.8)	●	Tōhoku Shinkansen (Hokkaido, Akita, Yamagata); Jōetsu Shinkansen; Hokuriku Shinkansen; Utsunomiya Line/Takasaki Line (JU07); Shōnan–Shinjuku Line (JS24); Saikyō Line (JA26); ■ Kawagoe Line; Tōbu Urban Park Line (TD01); New Shuttle (NS01)	Ōmiya-ku, Saitama	Saitama
Tōhoku	JK46	Saitama-Shintoshin さいたま新都心	1.6 (0.99)	1.6 (0.99)	28.7 (17.8)	●	Utsunomiya Line/Takasaki Line (JU06)	Ōmiya-ku, Saitama	Saitama
Tōhoku	JK45	Yono 与野	1.1 (0.68)	2.7 (1.7)	27.6 (17.1)	●		Urawa-ku, Saitama	Saitama
Tōhoku	JK44	Kita-Urawa 北浦和	1.6 (0.99)	4.3 (2.7)	26.0 (16.2)	●		Urawa-ku, Saitama	Saitama
Tōhoku		Urawa 浦和	1.8 (1.1)	6.1 (3.8)	24.2 (15.0)	●	Utsunomiya Line/Takasaki Line (JU05); Shōnan–Shinjuku Line (JS23)	Urawa-ku, Saitama	Saitama
Tōhoku	JK42	Minami-Urawa 南浦和	1.7 (1.1)	7.8 (4.8)	22.5 (14.0)	●	Musashino Line (JM25)	Minami-ku, Saitama	Saitama
Tōhoku	JK41	Warabi 蕨	2.8 (1.7)	10.6 (6.6)	19.7 (12.2)	●		Warabi	Saitama
Tōhoku	JK40	Nishi-Kawaguchi 西川口	1.9 (1.2)	12.5 (7.8)	17.8 (11.1)	●		Kawaguchi	Saitama
Tōhoku	JK39	Kawaguchi 川口	2.0 (1.2)	14.5 (9.0)	15.8 (9.8)	●		Kawaguchi	Saitama
Tōhoku		Akabane 赤羽	2.6 (1.6)	17.1 (10.6)	13.2 (8.2)	●	Utsunomiya Line/Takasaki Line (JU04); Shōnan–Shinjuku Line (JS22); Saikyō Line (JA15)	Kita	Tokyo
Tōhoku	JK37	Higashi-Jūjō 東十条	1.8 (1.1)	18.9 (11.7)	11.4 (7.1)	●		Kita	Tokyo
Tōhoku	JK36	Ōji 王子	1.5 (0.93)	20.4 (12.7)	9.9 (6.2)	●	Namboku Line (N-16); Toden Arakawa Line (Oji-ekimae: SA16)	Kita	Tokyo
Tōhoku	JK35	Kami-Nakazato 上中里	1.1 (0.68)	21.5 (13.4)	8.8 (5.5)	●		Kita	Tokyo
Tōhoku	JK34	Tabata 田端	1.7 (1.1)	23.2 (14.4)	7.1 (4.4)	■	Yamanote Line (JY09)	Kita	Tokyo
Tōhoku	JK33	Nishi-Nippori 西日暮里	0.8 (0.50)	24.0 (14.9)	6.3 (3.9)	｜	Yamanote Line (JY08); Chiyoda Line (C-16); Nippori–Toneri Liner (NT02)	Arakawa	Tokyo
Tōhoku		Nippori 日暮里	0.5 (0.31)	24.5 (15.2)	5.8 (3.6)	｜	Yamanote Line (JY07); Jōban Line (Rapid) (JJ02); Main Line (KS02); Nippori–Toneri Liner (NT01)	Arakawa	Tokyo
Tōhoku	JK31	Uguisudani 鶯谷	1.1 (0.68)	25.6 (15.9)	4.7 (2.9)	｜	Yamanote Line (JY06)	Taitō	Tokyo
Tōhoku		Ueno 上野	1.1 (0.68)	26.7 (16.6)	3.6 (2.2)	■	Tōhoku Shinkansen (Hokkaido, Akita, Yamagata); Jōetsu Shinkansen; Hokuriku Shinkansen; Yamanote Line (JY05); Utsunomiya Line/Takasaki Line (JU02); Jōban Line (Rapid) (JJ01); Tōkaidō Line Ueno–Tokyo Line (JU02); Ginza Line (G-16); Hibiya Line (H-18); Main Line (Keisei Ueno: KS01)	Taitō	Tokyo
Tōhoku	JK29	Okachimachi 御徒町	0.6 (0.37)	27.3 (17.0)	3.0 (1.9)	▲	Yamanote Line (JY04); Ōedo Line (Ueno-okachimachi: E-09); Ginza Line (Ueno-hirokoji: G-15); Hibiya Line (Naka-okachimachi: H-17)	Taitō	Tokyo
Tōhoku		Akihabara 秋葉原	1.0 (0.62)	28.3 (17.6)	2.0 (1.2)	■	Yamanote Line (JY03); Chūō–Sōbu Line (JB19); Hibiya Line (H-16); Tsukuba Express (TX01)	Chiyoda	Tokyo
Tōhoku		Kanda 神田	0.7 (0.43)	29.0 (18.0)	1.3 (0.81)	■	Yamanote Line (JY02); Chūō Line (JC02); Ginza Line (G-13)	Chiyoda	Tokyo
Tōhoku		Tokyo 東京	1.3 (0.81)	30.3 (18.8)	0 (0)	■	Tokaido Shinkansen; Tōhoku Shinkansen (Hokkaido, Akita, Yamagata); Jōetsu Shinkansen; Hokuriku Shinkansen; Yamanote Line (JY01); Chūō Line (JC01); Tōkaidō Line (JT01); Ueno–Tokyo Line (JU01); Yokosuka Line/Sōbu Line (Rapid) (JO19); Keiyō Line (JE01); Marunouchi Line (M-17)	Chiyoda	Tokyo
Tōkaidō		Tokyo 東京	1.3 (0.81)	30.3 (18.8)	0 (0)	■	Tokaido Shinkansen; Tōhoku Shinkansen (Hokkaido, Akita, Yamagata); Jōetsu Shinkansen; Hokuriku Shinkansen; Yamanote Line (JY01); Chūō Line (JC01); Tōkaidō Line (JT01); Ueno–Tokyo Line (JU01); Yokosuka Line/Sōbu Line (Rapid) (JO19); Keiyō Line (JE01); Marunouchi Line (M-17)	Chiyoda	Tokyo
Tōkaidō	JK25	Yūrakuchō 有楽町	0.8 (0.50)	31.1 (19.3)	0.8 (0.50)	｜	Yamanote Line (JY30); Yūrakuchō Line (Y-18); Hibiya Station: Hibiya Line (H-08) Chiyoda Line (C-09) Mita Line (I-08)	Chiyoda	Tokyo
Tōkaidō		Shimbashi 新橋	1.1 (0.68)	32.2 (20.0)	1.9 (1.2)	｜	Yamanote Line (JY29); Tōkaidō Line (JT02); Yokosuka Line (JO18); Ginza Line (G-08); Asakusa Line (A-10); Yurikamome (U-01)	Minato	Tokyo
Tōkaidō		Hamamatsuchō 浜松町	1.2 (0.75)	33.4 (20.8)	3.1 (1.9)	■	Yamanote Line (JY28); Haneda Airport Line (MO01); Asakusa Line (Daimon: A-09); Ōedo Line (Daimon: E-20)	Minato	Tokyo
Tōkaidō	JK22	Tamachi 田町	1.5 (0.93)	34.9 (21.7)	4.6 (2.9)	■	Yamanote Line (JY27); Mita: Asakusa Line (A-08) Mita Line (I-04)	Minato	Tokyo
Tōkaidō		Takanawa Gateway 高輪ゲートウェイ	1.3 (0.81)	36.2 (22.5)	5.9 (3.7)	●	Yamanote Line (JY26); Sengakuji (A-07): Asakusa Line Main Line	Minato	Tokyo
Tōkaidō		Shinagawa 品川	0.9 (0.56)	37.1 (23.1)	6.8 (4.2)	●	Tokaido Shinkansen; Yamanote Line (JY25); Yokosuka Line (JO17); Tōkaidō Line (JT03); Main Line (KK01)	Minato	Tokyo
Tōkaidō	JK19	Ōimachi 大井町	2.4 (1.5)	39.5 (24.5)	9.2 (5.7)	●	Ōimachi Line (OM01); Rinkai Line (R-07)	Shinagawa	Tokyo
Tōkaidō	JK18	Ōmori 大森	2.2 (1.4)	41.7 (25.9)	11.4 (7.1)	●		Ōta	Tokyo
Tōkaidō	JK17	Kamata 蒲田	3.0 (1.9)	44.7 (27.8)	14.4 (8.9)	●	Ikegami Line (IK15); Tōkyū Tamagawa Line (TM07)	Ōta	Tokyo
Tōkaidō		Kawasaki 川崎	3.8 (2.4)	48.5 (30.1)	18.2 (11.3)	●	Tōkaidō Line (JT04); Nambu Line (JN01); Keikyū Kawasaki (KK20): Main Line Daishi Line	Kawasaki-ku, Kawasaki	Kanagawa
Tōkaidō	JK15	Tsurumi 鶴見	3.5 (2.2)	52.0 (32.3)	21.7 (13.5)	●	Tsurumi Line (JI01); Main Line (Keikyū Tsurumi: KK29)	Tsurumi-ku, Yokohama	Kanagawa
Tōkaidō	JK14	Shin-Koyasu 新子安	3.1 (1.9)	55.1 (34.2)	24.8 (15.4)	●	Main Line (Keikyū Shinkoyasu: KK32)	Kanagawa-ku, Yokohama	Kanagawa
Tōkaidō	JK13	Higashi-Kanagawa 東神奈川	2.2 (1.4)	57.3 (35.6)	27.0 (16.8)	●	Yokohama Line (JH13; through service via the Negishi Line to Sakuragichō); Main Line (Keikyū Higashi-kanagawa: KK35)	Kanagawa-ku, Yokohama	Kanagawa
Tōkaidō		Yokohama 橫浜	1.8 (1.1)	59.1 (36.7)	28.8 (17.9)	●	Negishi Line (JK12; through service); Yokohama Line (JK12); Yokosuka Line (JO13); Shōnan–Shinjuku Line (JS13); Tōkaidō Line (JT05); Tōyoko Line (TY21); Main Line (KK37); Sōtetsu Main Line (SO01); Blue Line (B20); Minatomirai Line (MM01)	Nishi-ku, Yokohama	Kanagawa
↓ Through-running to/from Ōfuna via the Negishi Line ↓

== Rolling stock ==
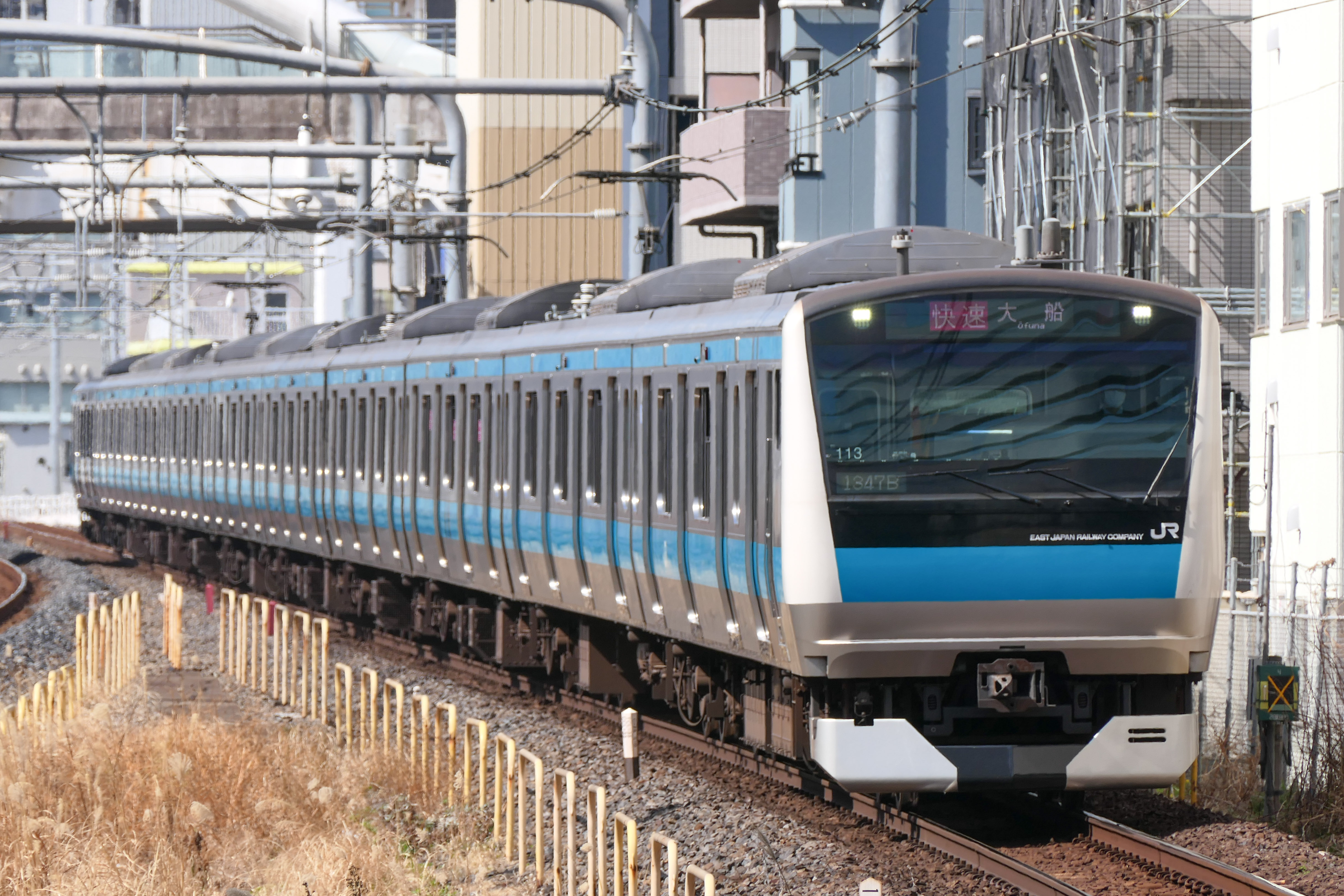
A Keihin-Tohoku Line E233-1000 series EMU, March 2021

As of January 2010, all Keihin-Tohoku Line services are formed of E233-1000 series 10-car electrical multiple unit (EMU) trains. These were phased in from December 2007, and replaced the previous 209 series 10-car EMUs by 24 January 2010. All Keihin-Tohoku Line rolling stock is based at Urawa Depot. Yokohama Line E233-6000 series 8-car EMUs also operate on through services over the Keihin-Tohoku Line between Higashi-Kanagawa and Ofuna stations.

=== Keihin–Tohoku Line & Negishi Line services ===
- E233-1000 series 10-car EMUs (sky blue stripe) (from December 2007)

=== Yokohama Line through services ===
- E233-6000 series 8-car EMUs (light/dark green stripe) (from February 2014)
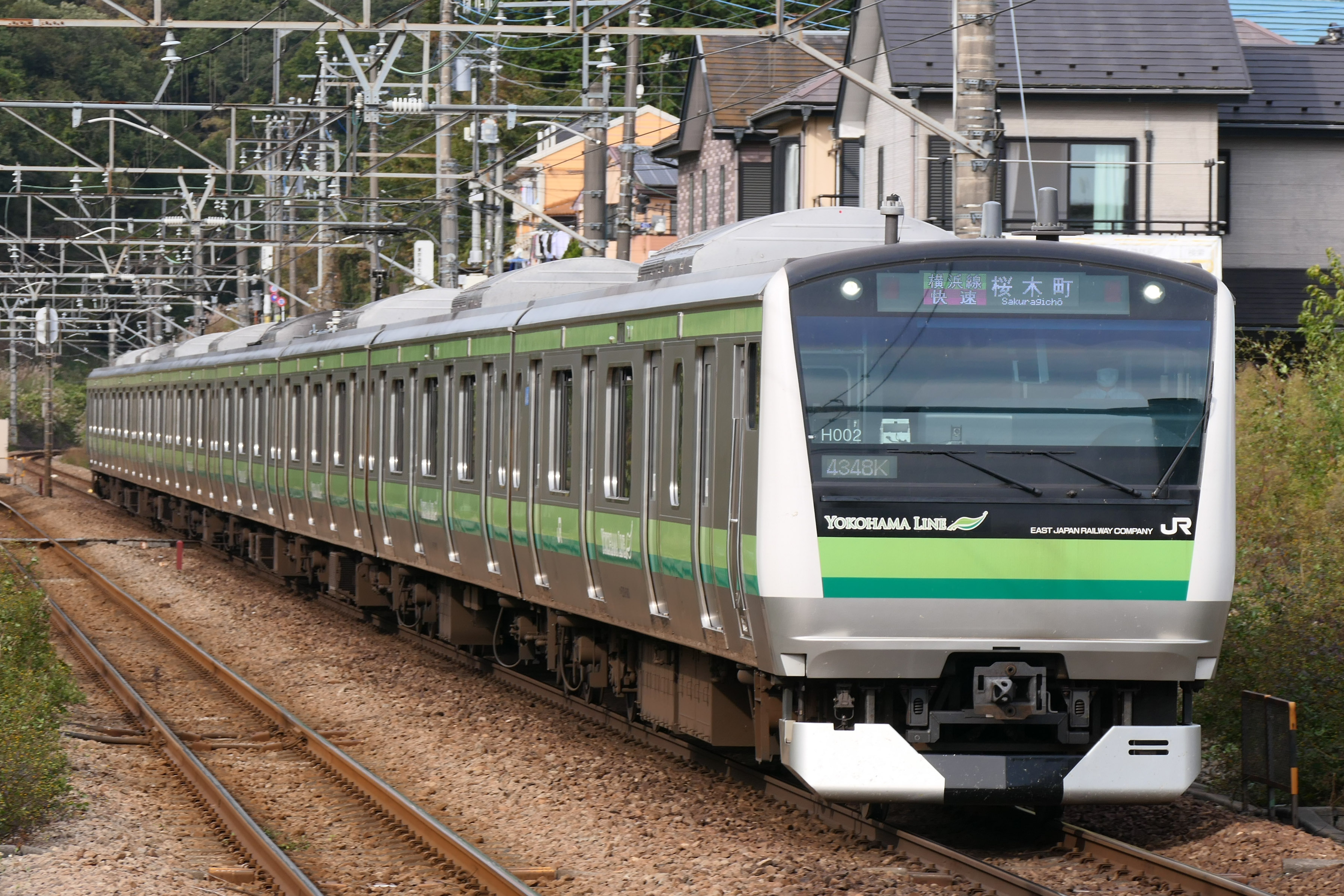
A Yokohama Line E233-6000 series EMU

=== Rolling stock used in the past ===
- 72 series 8-car EMUs (brown livery) (until October 1970)
- 101 series 10-car EMUs (sky blue livery) (from December 1970 until March 1978)
- 103 series 10-car EMUs (sky blue livery) (from October 1965 until March 1998)
- 205 series 10-car EMU (sky blue stripe) (from October 1989 until February 1996)
- 205 series 8-car EMUs (light/dark green stripe, on Yokohama Line through services until August 2014)
- 209-900 series 10-car EMUs (sky blue stripe) (from May 1992 until August 2007)
- 209-0 series 10-car EMUs (sky blue stripe) (from March 1993 until January 2010)
- 209-500 series 10-car EMUs (sky blue stripe) (from January 2001 until 2009)
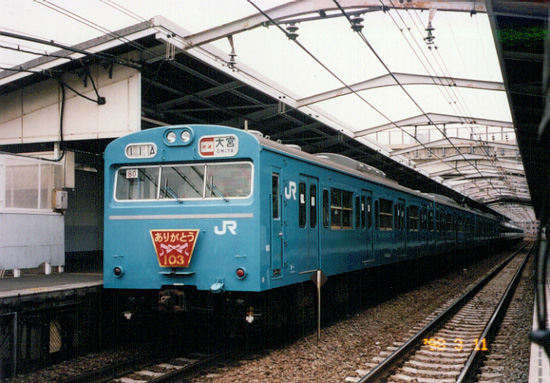
A Keihin-Tohoku Line 103 series EMU in March 1998

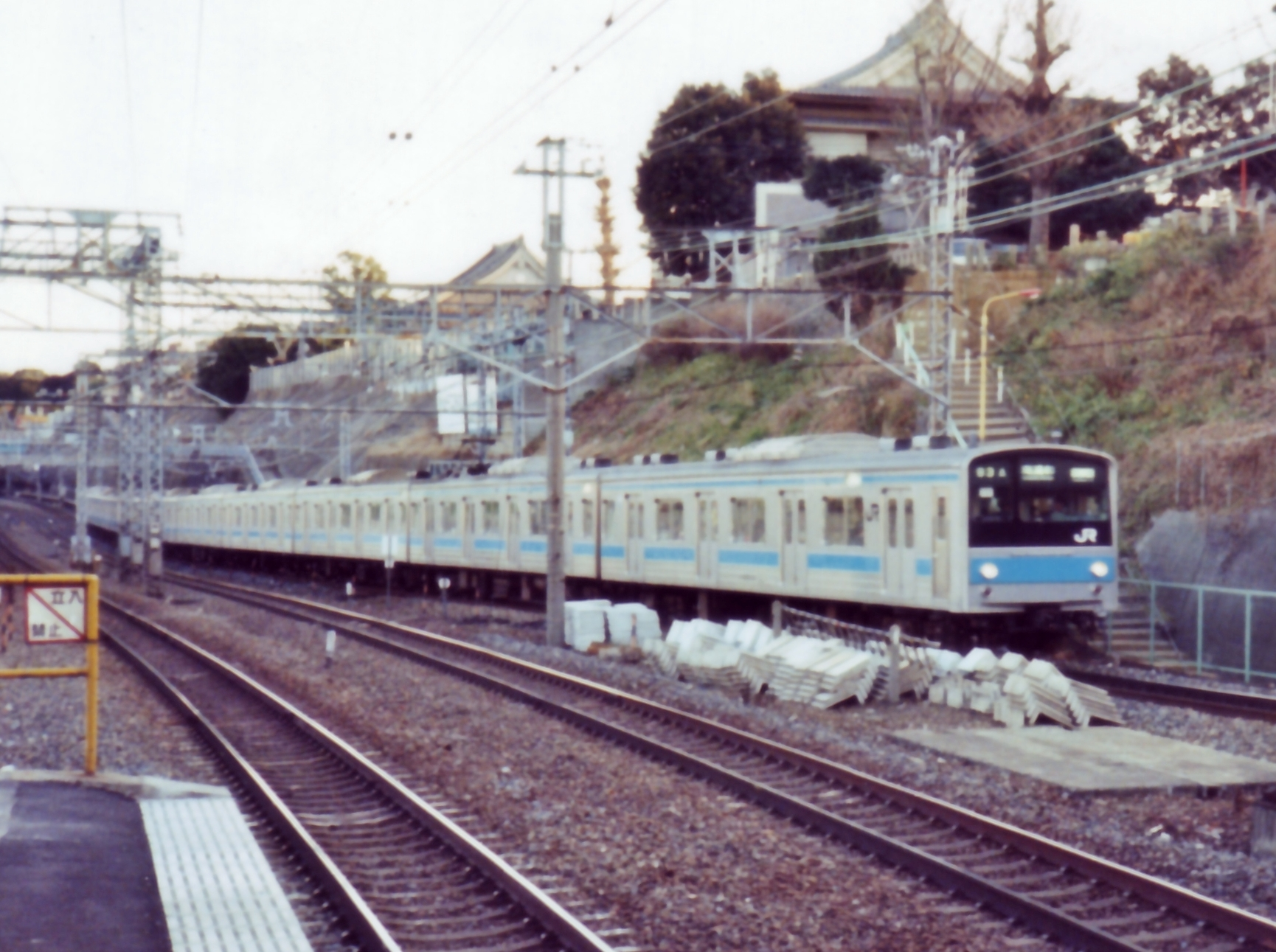
A Keihin-Tohoku Line 205 series EMU in February 1992

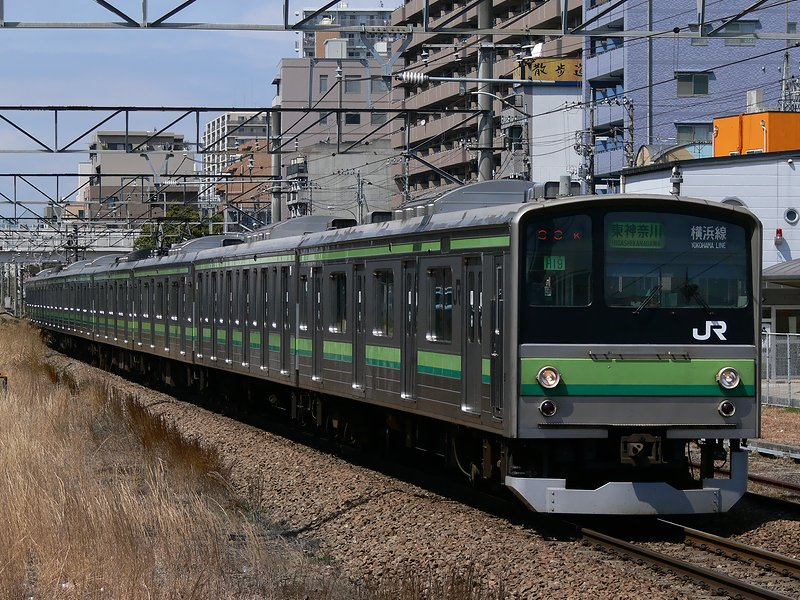
A Yokohama Line 205 series EMU

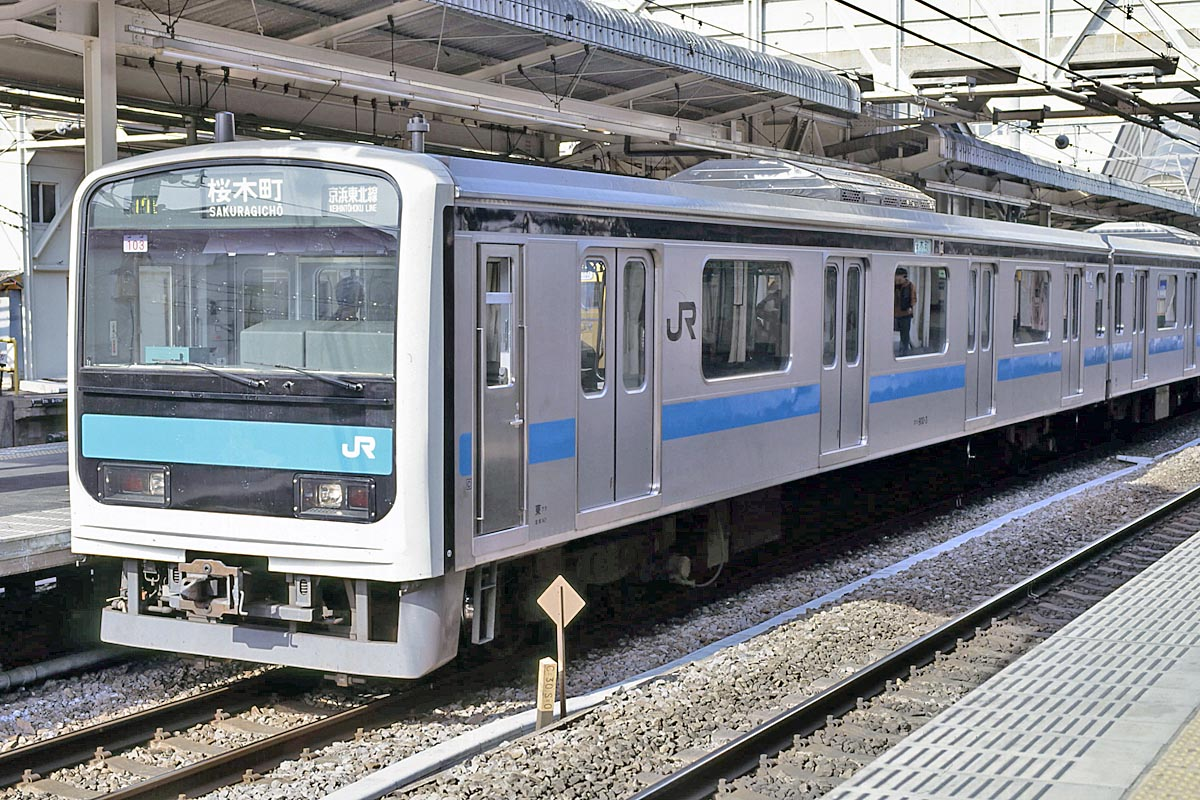
A Keihin-Tohoku Line 901 series (later 209-900 series) EMU in March 1993

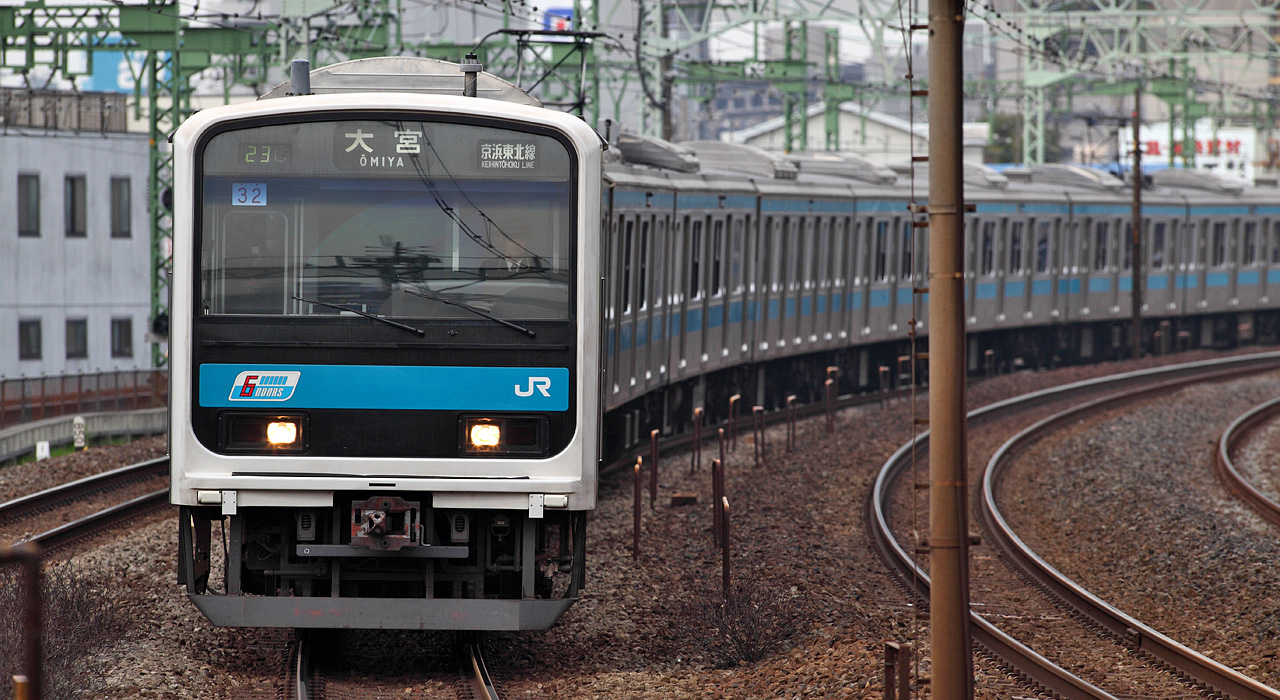
A Keihin-Tohoku Line 209 series EMU, March 2009

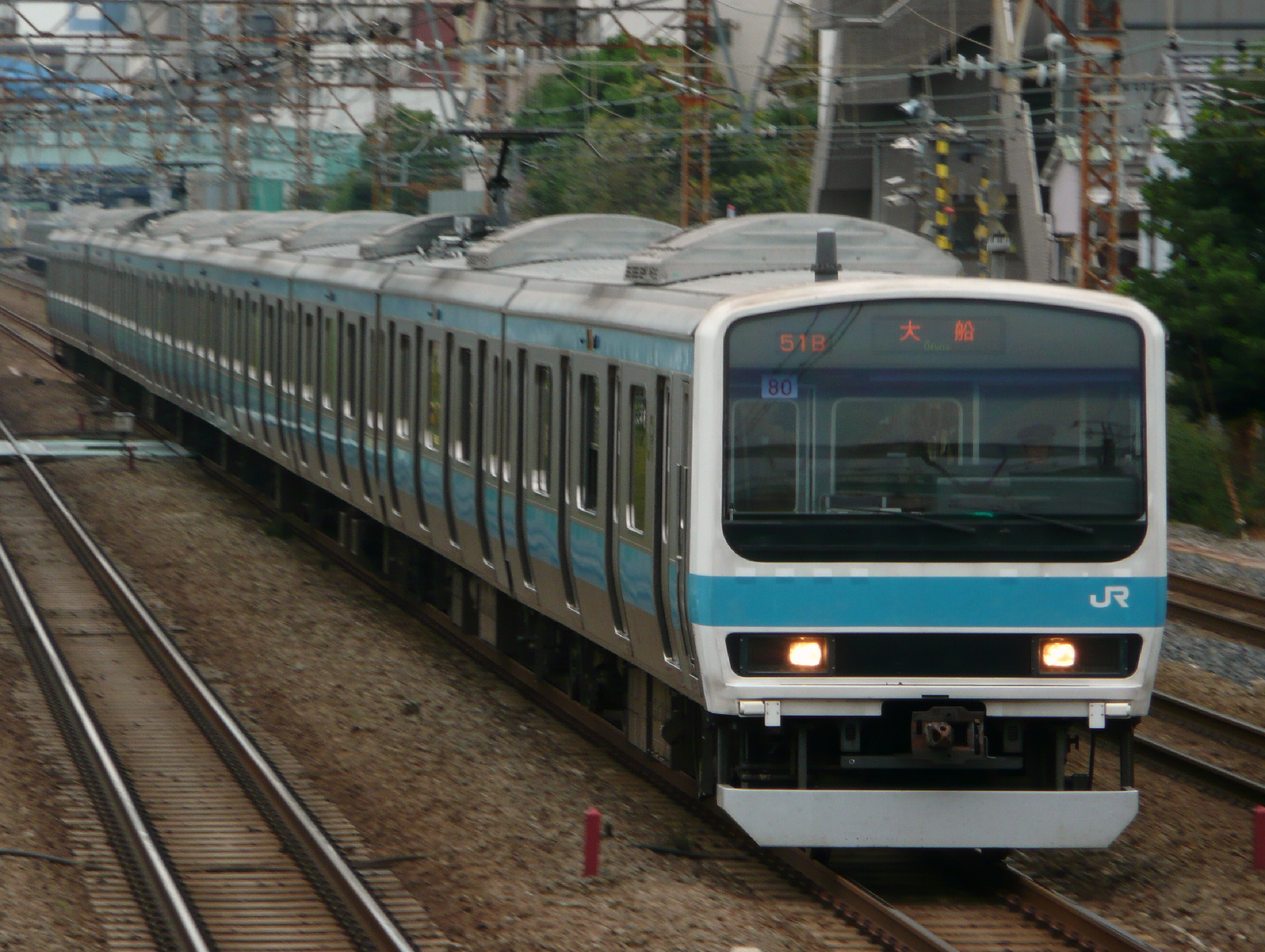
A Keihin-Tohoku Line 209-500 series EMU in November 2008

=== Timeline ===
72 series
101 series
103 series
205 series
209-900 series
209-0 series
209-500 series
E233-1000 series
│
1955
│
1960
│
1965
│
1970
│
1975
│
1980
│
1985
│
1990
│
1995
│
2000
│
2005
│
2010
│
2015
Rolling stock transitions since the 1950s

== History ==
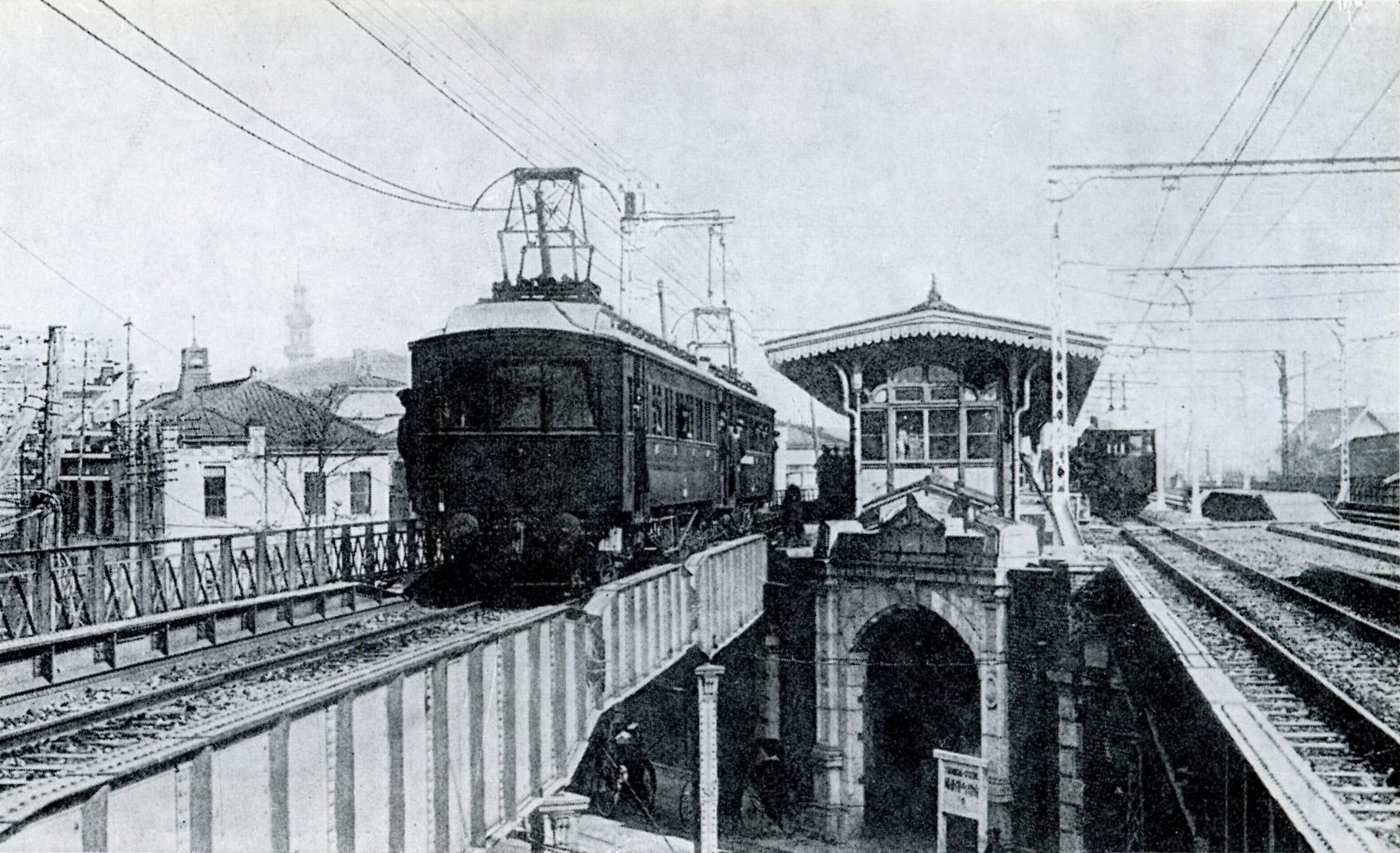
A test train on the Keihin Line at Yurakucho Station around 1914

The line opened on 20 December 1914 as an electrified passenger line connecting Shinagawa Station in Tokyo with Takashimacho Station in Yokohama. (The latter station was renamed Yokohama Station in August 1915, when the former Yokohama Station was renamed Sakuragicho Station). It was originally called the Tokaido Electric Line (Japanese: 東海道電車線) and was subsequently renamed to the Keihin Line (Japanese: 京浜線). From 30 December 1915, services were extended south to the new Sakuragicho Station.

The Keihin Line service was extended north via the Tohoku Main Line to Akabane Station in February 1928, and to Ōmiya Station in September 1932.

The Keihin Line initially had third-class and second-class cars, analogous to today's ordinary cars and Green Cars respectively. Second-class service ended in 1938 in order to accommodate special military cars during the World War II. The military seating was converted to seating for women and children after the war, and back to ordinary seating in 1973 amid overcrowding concerns: second-class service was briefly restored in the 1950s but abandoned shortly thereafter.

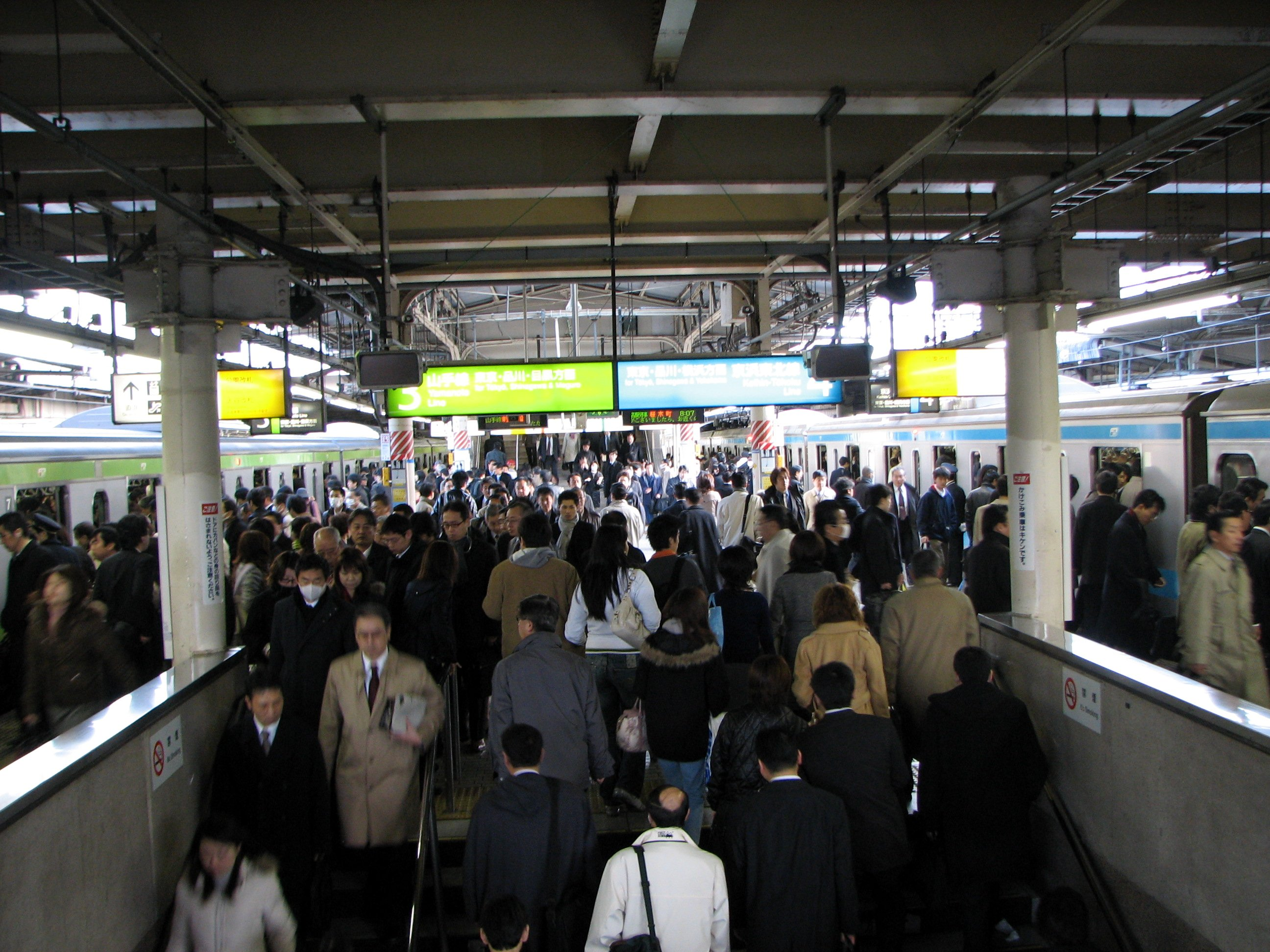
Morning peak on the Keihin–Tohoku Line at Ueno Station

From November 1956, the Keihin–Tohoku Line was physically separated from the between Tamachi and Tabata, allowing more frequent service. Through service with the Negishi Line began on 19 May 1964. 10-car trains (103 series) began operating from 1 April 1966.

Limited-stop "Rapid" services were introduced in 1988 to further ease congestion along the Yamanote Line corridor. From 14 March 2015, all rapid services began serving Kanda Station. Additionally, rapid services began serving Okachimachi Station on weekends and national holidays only.

On 20 August 2016, station numbering was introduced with stations being assigned station numbers between JK12 and JK47. Numbers increase towards in the northbound direction towards Omiya.

A new station, the Takanawa Gateway Station, opened on 14 March 2020, in time for the 2020 Summer Olympics to be held in Tokyo. The station is located on the and Keihin–Tohoku Line between Shinagawa and Tamachi stations. The distance between Shinagawa and Tamachi stations was 2.2 km (1.4 mi). Takanawa Gateway was constructed on top of the 20-hectare former railyard, which is undergoing rationalization and redevelopment by JR East. The Yamanote Line and the Keihin Tohoku Line tracks were moved slightly to the east to be aligned closer to the Tokaido Shinkansen tracks. The area on the west side of the yard made available will be redeveloped with high-rise office buildings, creating an international business center with connections to the Shinkansen and Haneda Airport.

== Accidents ==
At around 01:11 in the morning of 23 February 2014, an empty stock train operating from Sakuragicho to Kamata hit a track maintenance vehicle on the track close to Kawasaki Station. The first two cars of the 10-car E233 series train derailed, with the first car ending up on its side. The train was carrying no passengers, and the driver and conductor escaped with minor injuries.

== See also ==
- List of railway lines in Japan
