= Kita-Urawa Station =

Railway station in Saitama, Japan

JK44 Kita-Urawa Station 北浦和駅
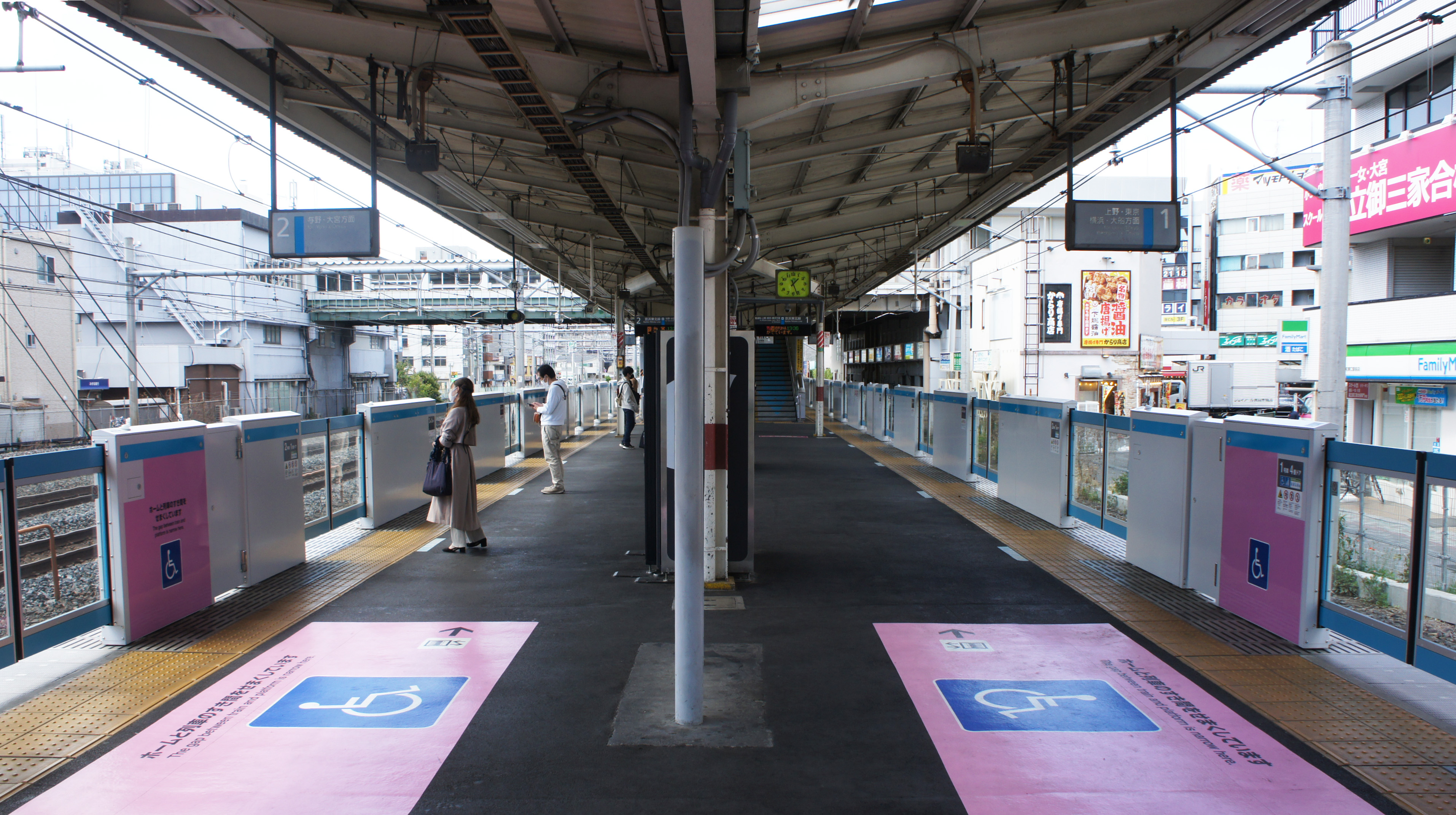
- The station platforms in April 2021

General information
- Location: 3-3-5 Kitaurawa, Urawa-ku, Saitama-shi, Saitama-ken; Japan
- Coordinates: 35.872°N 139.646°E
- Operator: JR East
- Line: Keihin–Tōhoku Line
- Distance: 26.0 km (16.2 mi) from Tokyo
- Platforms: 1 island platform
- Tracks: 2

Construction
- Structure type: At grade

Other information
- Status: Staffed ( Midori no Madoguchi )
- Station code: JK44
- Website: Official website

History
- Opened: 1 September 1936; 89 years ago

Passengers
- FY2019: 52,674

Services
Preceding station	JR East	Following station
Urawa towards Yokohama	Keihin–Tōhoku Line Rapid Local	Yono JK45 towards Ōmiya
Location
- Location within Saitama Prefecture Location within Japan

Kita-Urawa Station (北浦和駅, Kita-Urawa eki) is a passenger railway station on the Keihin-Tohoku Line in Urawa-ku, Saitama, Saitama Prefecture, Japan, operated by East Japan Railway Company (JR East).

== Lines ==
Kita-Urawa Station is served by the Keihin-Tōhoku Line. It is 4.3 kilometers from Ōmiya and 26.0 kilometers from Tokyo.

== Layout ==
The station has one island platform serving two tracks, connected by a footbridge to the elevated station building. The station has a Midori no Madoguchi staffed ticket office.

=== Platforms ===
1	Keihin-Tōhoku Line	for Urawa, Ueno, Tokyo, Shinagawa, Yokohama and Ōfuna
2	Keihin-Tōhoku Line	for Yono and Ōmiya

== History ==
The station opened on 1 September 1936. The station became part of the JR East network after JNR privatization on 1 April 1987.

== Passenger statistics ==
In fiscal 2019, the station was used by an average of 52,674 passengers daily (boarding passengers only).

== Surrounding area ==
- Saitama Museum of Modern Art
- Kita-Urawa Park
- National Route 17

=== Bus terminal ===
Kita-Urawa Bus Terminal is a seven-minute walk east of the station.

==== Kita-Urawa Bus Terminal ====
No.	Route	Via	Destination	Operators	Notes
1	浦31	Urawa High School Minami, Nishijuku, Kitajuku	Saitama Municipal Hospital	Tobu Bus West
1	浦31	Urawa High School Minami, Nishijuku, Kitajuku	Municipal Housing	Tobu Bus West
1	浦31	Urawa High School Minami, Nishijuku, Kitajuku	JR company housing	Tobu Bus West
1	浦31 急行	Nishijuku, Kitajuku	Saitama Municipal Hospital	Tobu Bus West
3	北浦50	Ryoke Koban, Yono Station	Saitama-Shintoshin Station	Kokusai Kogyo Bus	No.3 bus stop is used at lunch time. Excluding the time, these bus routes don't stop at this bus terminal. But, passengers are able to ride on these routes at Kita-Urawa Station East Exit in the time.
3	北浦50-2	Ryoke 2 chome	Kamikizaki	Kokusai Kogyo Bus	No.3 bus stop is used at lunch time. Excluding the time, these bus routes don't stop at this bus terminal. But, passengers are able to ride on these routes at Kita-Urawa Station East Exit in the time.
3	北浦50-3	Ryoke Koban, Yono Station	Saitama-Shintoshin Station	Kokusai Kogyo Bus	No.3 bus stop is used at lunch time. Excluding the time, these bus routes don't stop at this bus terminal. But, passengers are able to ride on these routes at Kita-Urawa Station East Exit in the time.
3	北浦55		Ryoke 2 chome	Kokusai Kogyo Bus	No.3 bus stop is used at lunch time. Excluding the time, these bus routes don't stop at this bus terminal. But, passengers are able to ride on these routes at Kita-Urawa Station East Exit in the time.
5	岩01	Urawa High School, Ryoke Koban, Fujimi-ga-oka	Iwatsuki Station	Tobu Bus West
5	岩02	Urawa High School, Ryoke Koban, Fujimi-ga-oka	Miyashita	Tobu Bus West
5	岩03	Urawa High School, Ryoke Koban, Fujimi-ga-oka	Higashi-Arai Danchi	Tobu Bus West
5	岩04	Urawa High School, Ryoke Koban, Fujimi-ga-oka	Miyashita	Tobu Bus West
5	岩05	Urawa High School, Ryoke Koban, Fujimi-ga-oka	Higashi-Arai Danchi	Tobu Bus West
8	浦31		Urawa Station	Tobu Bus West
8	岩04		Urawa Station	Tobu Bus West
8	岩05		Urawa Station	Tobu Bus West

== See also ==
- List of railway stations in Japan
