= Urawa Station =

Railway station in Saitama, Japan

URWJU05 JS23 JK43 Urawa Station 浦和駅
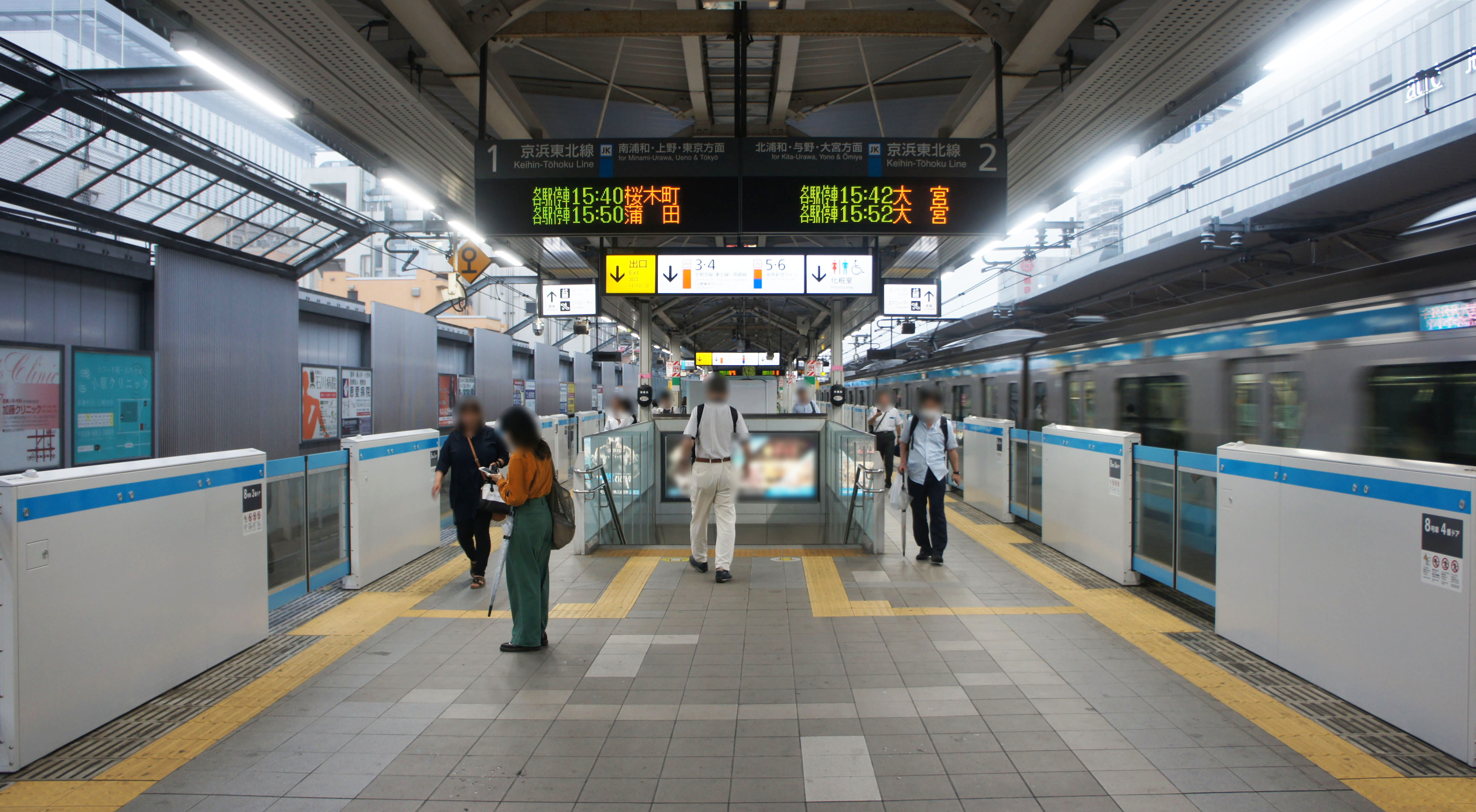
- JR Urawa Station Platform 1 and 2

General information
- Location: 1-16-12 Takasago, Urawa Ward, Saitama City, Saitama Prefecture 330-0063; Japan
- Coordinates: 35°51′30.53″N 139°39′25.51″E
- Operator: JR East
- Line: Tōhoku Main Line
- Distance: 24.2 km (15.0 mi) from Tokyo
- Platforms: 3 island platforms
- Tracks: 6
- Connections: Bus terminal

Construction
- Structure type: Elevated

Other information
- Station code: JU05, JS23, JK43
- Website: Official website

History
- Opened: 28 July 1883; 143 years ago

Passengers
- FY2019: 95,865 daily
Services
Preceding station	JR East	Following station
Minami-Urawa JK42 towards Yokohama	Keihin–Tōhoku Line Rapid Local	Kita-Urawa JK44 towards Ōmiya
Akabane towards Ueno	Kusatsu	Ōmiya towards Naganohara-Kusatsuguchi
Akabane towards Ueno	Akagi	Ōmiya towards Takasaki
Akabane One-way operation	Utsunomiya / Takasaki lines Rapid Rabbit & Urban	Ōmiya towards Utsunomiya or Takasaki
Akabane towards Tokyo	Utsunomiya / Takasaki lines Local	Saitama-Shintoshin JU06 towards Kuroiso or Maebashi
Ikebukuro towards Shinjuku	Nikkō and Kinugawa	Ōmiya towards Tōbu Nikkō or Kinugawa-Onsen
Akabane towards Odawara or Zushi	Shōnan–Shinjuku Line Special Rapid Rapid Local	Ōmiya towards Takasaki, Maebashi or Utsunomiya
Track layout
Location
- Location within Saitama Prefecture Location within Kanto Area Location within Japan

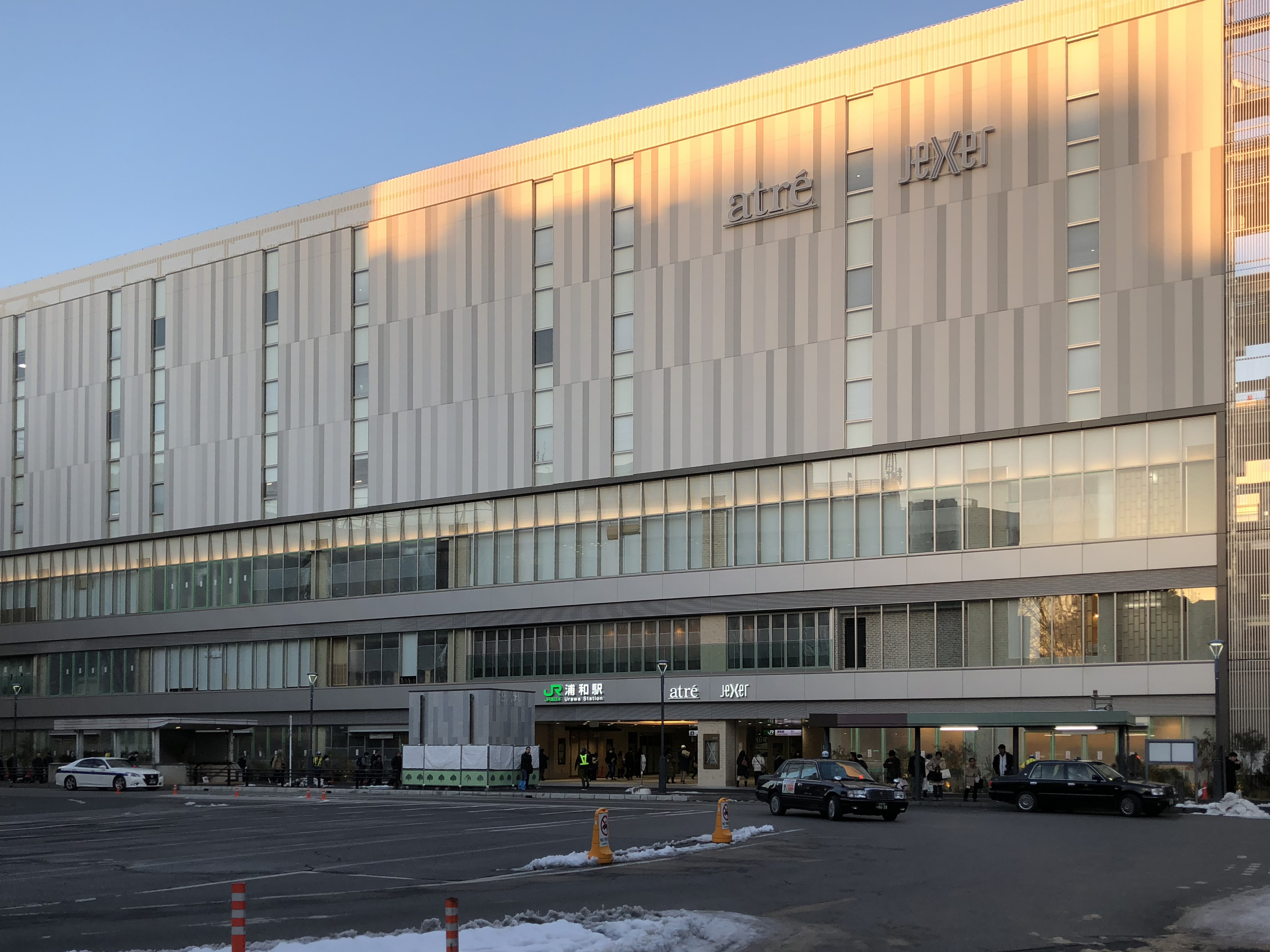
Urawa Station west entrance in January 2018

Urawa Station (浦和駅, Urawa-eki) is a junction passenger railway station located in Urawa-ku, Saitama, Japan, operated by East Japan Railway Company (JR East). It is located near Saitama City Office and the Saitama Prefectural Government Office.

== Lines ==
Urawa Station is served by the Tōhoku Main Line (Utsunomiya Line, Takasaki Line, Keihin-Tōhoku Line, and Shōnan-Shinjuku Lines. It is 6.1 kilometers from Ōmiya and 24.2 kilometers from Tokyo.

== Station layout ==
The station has three elevated island platforms, serving six tracks, with the station building underneath. The station has a "Midori no Madoguchi" staffed ticket office.

=== Platforms ===
1	Keihin-Tōhoku Line	for Ueno, Tokyo, Shinagawa, Yokohama, and Negishi Line for Ōfuna
2	Keihin-Tōhoku Line	for Kita-Urawa, Yono, and Ōmiya
3	Utsunomiya Line	for Akabane, Ueno; Ueno-Tokyo Line for Tokyo, Yokohama, and Ōfuna
3	Takasaki Line	for Akabane and Ueno; Ueno-Tokyo Line for Tokyo, Yokohama, and Ōfuna
4	Utsunomiya Line	for Oyama, Utsunomiya, and Kuroiso
4	Takasaki Line	for Takasaki and Maebashi
5	Shōnan-Shinjuku Line	for Akabane, Shinjuku, Yokohama and Ōfuna; Yokosuka Line for Zushi; Tokaido Line for Odawara
6	Shōnan-Shinjuku Line	for Ōmiya; Utsunomiya Line for Utsunomiya; Takasaki Line for Takasaki

== History ==
Urawa Station opened on 28 July 1883 as a station of Nippon Tetsudō (lit. Japan Railway) company, when this company opened the railway from Ueno Station to Kumagaya Station (part of today's Takasaki Line). At that time, there were only six stations along the route (Ueno, Ōji, Urawa, Ageo, Kōnosu, and Kumagaya), so Urawa Station is one of the oldest stations of the Tōhoku Main Line, and is also the oldest in the present-day city of Saitama.

Following eight years of construction, the station became fully elevated in March 2013, therefore allowing the Shōnan-Shinjuku Line to serve the station from 16 March 2013 onwards.

In 2017, chest-height platform edge doors were installed on the Keihin-Tōhoku Line platforms (1 and 2), brought into use from 21 October 2017.

== Passenger statistics ==
In fiscal 2019, the station was used by an average of 95,865 passengers daily (boarding passengers only).

The daily passenger figures (boarding passengers only) in previous years are as shown below.

Fiscal year	Daily average
2000	73,995
2005	73,633
2010	79,113
2015	87,650

== Surrounding area ==
- Saitama Prefectural Government Office
- Saitama City Office
- Isetan department store
- Corso (department store located in front of Urawa Station west exit)
- Parco Department Store
- Urawa Royal Pines Hotel
- Urawa Washington Hotel
- National Route 17
- National Route 463

== See also ==
- List of railway stations in Japan
