= Shinobazu Pond =

Pond in Ueno Park, Tokyo, Japan

Coordinates: 35°42′41″N 139°46′12″E

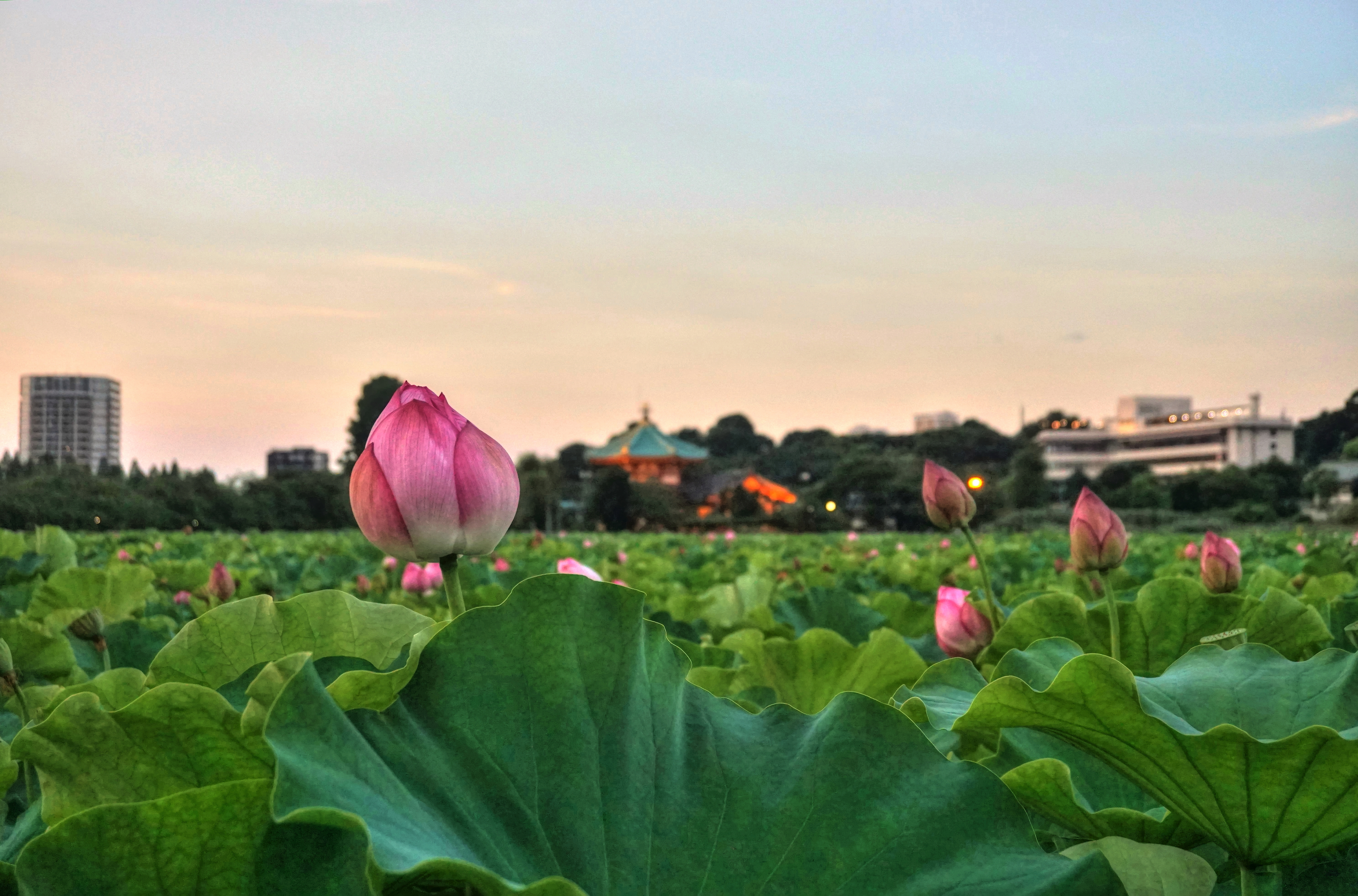
Shinobazu Pond and Benten-dō Temple, Tokyo

The Shinobazu Pond (不忍池, Shinobazu no Ike; Japanese pronunciation: [ɕi.no.ba.(d)zɯ (no i.keꜜ)]) is a pond within Ueno Park (a spacious public park located in the Ueno section of Taitō, Tokyo, Japan), and a historically prominent Shitamachi feature often appearing in history and works of art. The park occupies the site of the former Kan'ei-ji, a temple closely associated with the Tokugawa shōguns, who had built it to guard Edo Castle against the northeast, a direction believed to be unlucky by traditional geomancy. The temple was destroyed during the Boshin War. The pond, although modified many times and even once drained, is natural.

== Position and dimensions ==
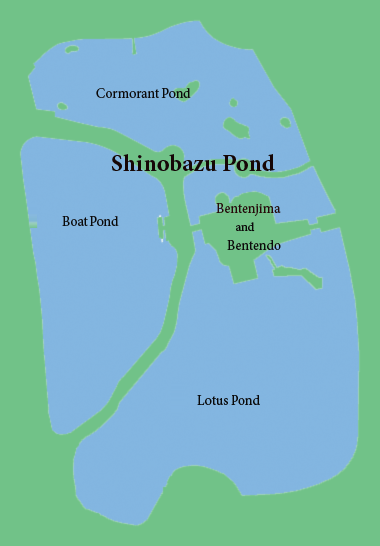
The Shinobazu Pond and its subdivisions

Situated in the south of Ueno Park, the pond is divided in three sections (see map), one called Lotus Pond (蓮の池, Hasu no Ike) because of the plants that during the summer completely cover its surface, one called Boat Pond (ボートの池, Bōto no Ike) from the rental boats it hosts, and the third called Cormorant Pond (鵜の池, U no Ike), which lies within the limits of the Ueno Zoo and takes its name from the birds that inhabit it.

The pond has a circumference of about 2 km and a surface of about 1,100,000m^{2}. To the north it borders with the Ueno Zoo, to the east with Keisei Ueno Station, to the south and to the west with Shinobazu Dori. At its center lies Benten Island (弁天島, Benten-jima) on which stands the Benten-dō (弁天堂), a temple dedicated to the goddess Benzaiten.

The park is divided in three parts by two promenades.

Name	Surface (10,000m^{2})	Average Depth (cm)	Water volume (1000m^{3})
Boat Pond	30	86	26
Lotus Pond	55	84	46
Cormorant Pond	25	92	23

== Origin of the name ==
According to the stone inscription on Benten Island, the area between the Ueno Plateau and the Hongo Plateau used to be called Shinobugaoka (忍ヶ丘), and the pond just took its name from it, but there are alternative theories. According to one, the early name Shinowazu (篠輪津, Shino wa zu) due to the presence of bamboo grass later turned into Shinobazu. Another claims the name comes from the habit of young men and women to meet secretly here.

== History and changes ==
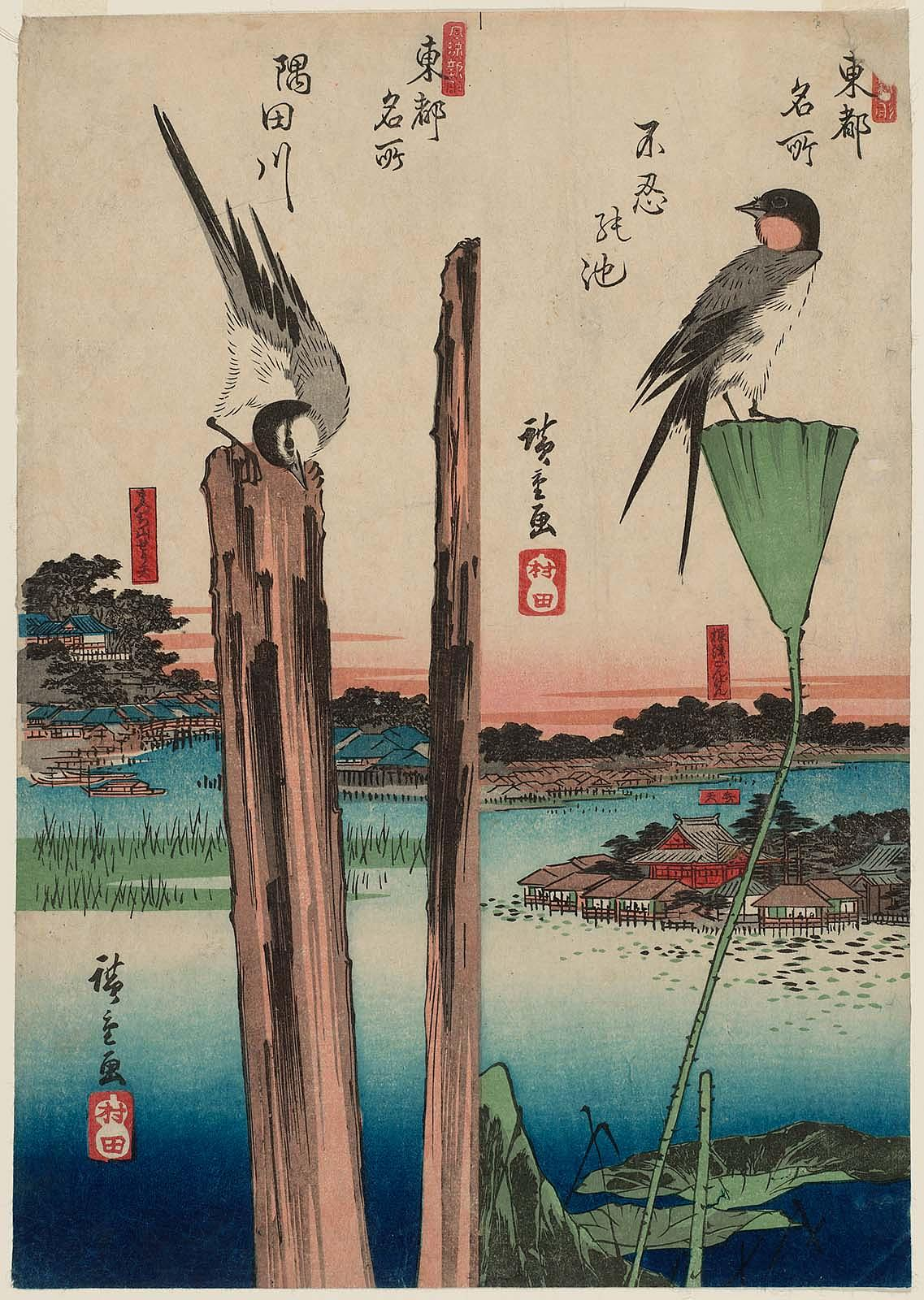
A woodblock print by Utagawa Hiroshige showing on the right half the pond and the Benten-dō (Edo period, Tenpō 11 (about 1840))

In the Jōmon period the entire place used to be just a cove of Tokyo Bay. Later, some centuries into the Common Era, the sea withdrew, leaving behind extensive marshes that covered most of the old Shitamachi. The pond is what remains of those marshes. We know that by the 15th Century the present name was already in use.

In 1625 the Edo shogunate had the Kan'ei-ji built here as a counterpart to Hieizan's Enryakuji in West Japan. The temple's founder Jigen Daishi (Tenkai), liking Lake Biwa, had Benten Island built in imitation of Chikubushima, and then the Bentendo on it. At the time the island was accessible only by boat, but later a stone bridge was added on the east, making it possible to walk to it.

The pond's shape until the beginning of the Meiji Era was very different from now, in particular the northern part where the Ueno Zoo is, which was much wider. At the time, the Aizomegawa flowed into it. In 1884 however, a cooperative horse racing company, wanting to open a racing track, had the pond partly filled, bringing it to the present shape and size. The first horse race took place in the November of the same year in the presence of the Emperor, and until 1892 races took place every spring and summer.

In 1907 the Kangetsukyō Bridge (観月橋, Kangetsukyō) was built toward the west in occasion of the Tokyo Industrial Fair, making it possible to walk across the whole pond. In 1929 more work divided the pond in four distinct parts. The boat rental business, which continues to the present day, was started in 1939. Today's Cormorants Pond is the result of the fusion of two of those four sections.

During the Pacific War water was pumped out and the pond divided into rice paddies (the so-called Shinobazu Tanbo (不忍田圃, Shinobazu tanbo). There was later, among others, a plan to build a baseball field on it, but in 1949 it was decided to return the pond to its original form which we still see today.

In September 1967 a hole was opened by accident in the pond during the construction of Tokyo Metro Chiyoda Line, and approximately 30 thousand tons of water flowed away.

In the years between 1990 and 1994, the city authorities installed water purification equipment.

== Nature ==
=== Birds ===
The pond hosts several dozens of types of migratory and stationary birds, whose number at times is over ten thousand. Among them particularly numerous are tufted ducks, pochard, and northern pintails.

=== Fish ===
The pond contains numerous species of fish.

=== Plants ===
The lotuses of Lotus Pond, fully grown in summer, cover the entire surface of the water, hiding it almost completely.

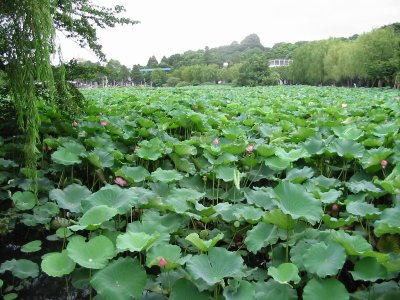
Water lilies at Shinobazu Pond

=== Other fauna ===
In June 2006, alligator snapping turtles, which are a non-native species, were found in the pond, and there is the possibility that they are breeding. Since then, authorities have posted warnings against alligator snapping turtles and snapping turtles.

== Nearby places of interest ==
- Ueno Tōshō-gū shrine
- Saigō Takamori statue
- Shitamachi Museum
- Suijō Ongakudō Concert Hall (水上音楽堂, Suijō Ongakudō)
- Gojōten Jinja (五條天神社, Gojōten Jinja) Shrine
- Ueno Zoo

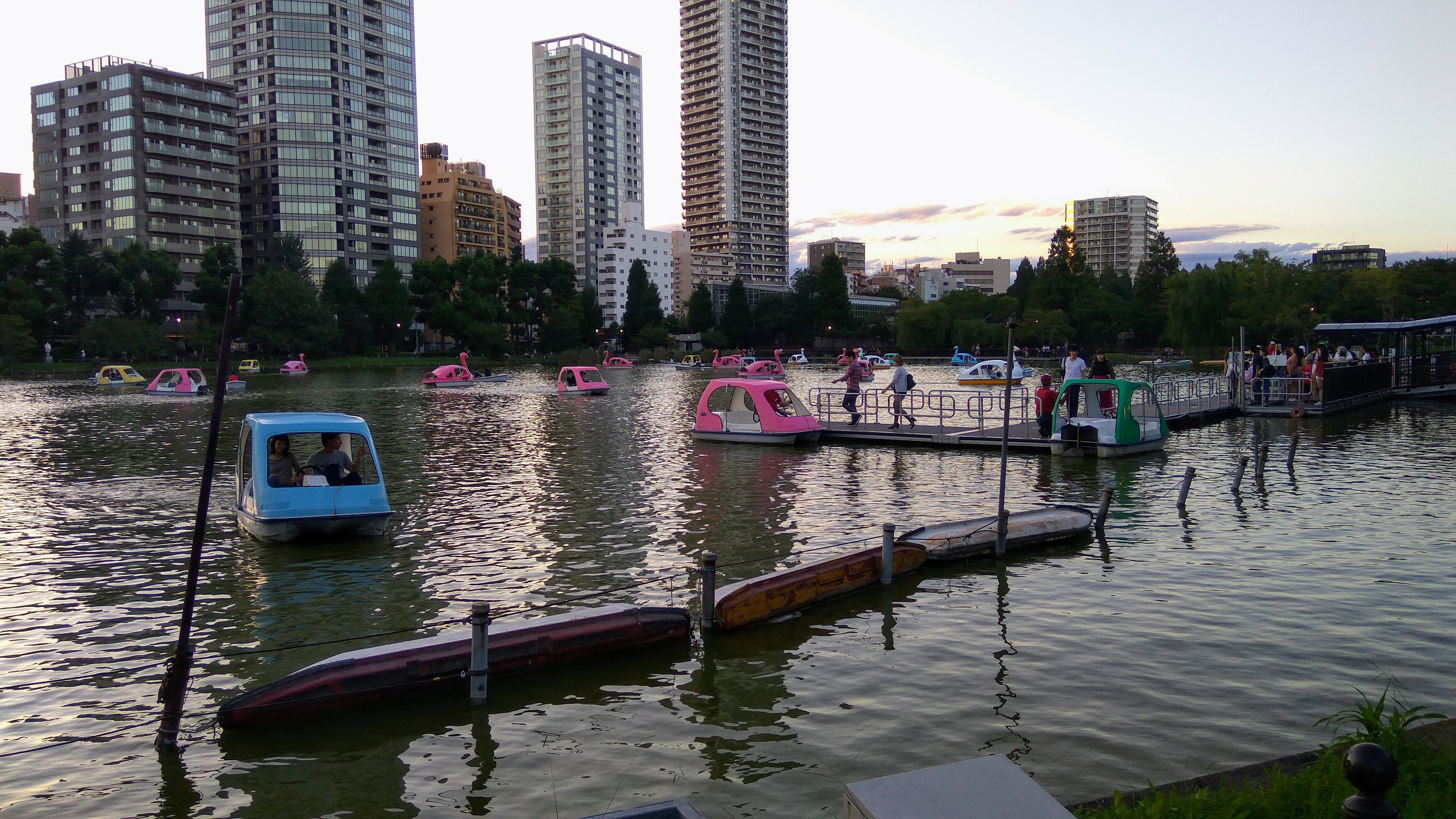
Boats in Shinobazu Pond

== Access ==
- Keisei Ueno Station
- Ueno Station
- Okachimachi Station
- Ueno-hirokoji Station
- Ueno-okachimachi Station
- Naka-okachimachi Station
- Yushima Station
- Nezu Station
