= Yushima Station (Tokyo) =

Metro station in Tokyo, Japan

Coordinates: 35.707954°N 139.769933°E

Yushima Station 湯島駅

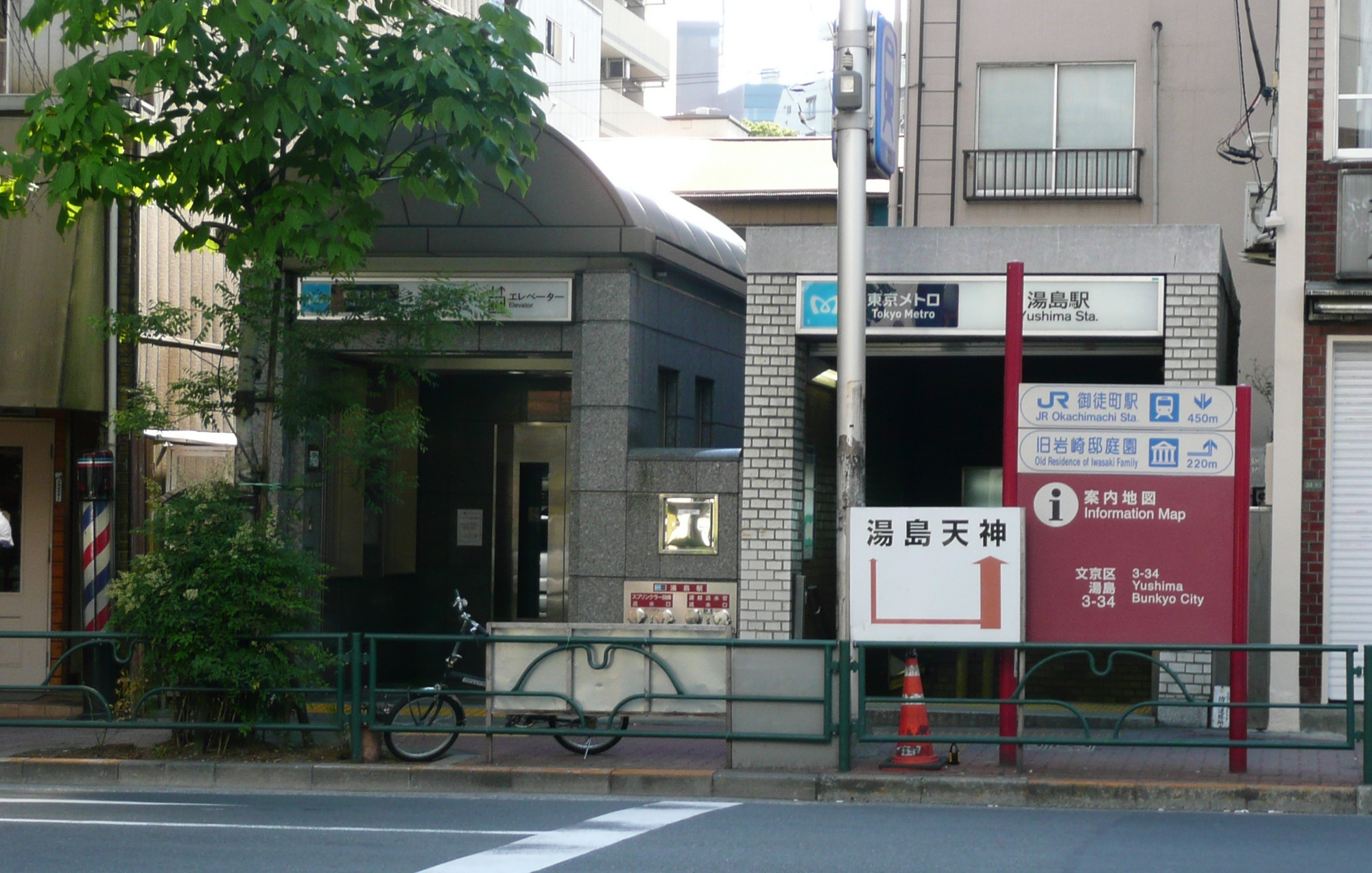
- Yushima Station

General information
- Location: 3-47-10 Yushima, Bunkyō-ku, Tokyo; Japan
- Operator: Tokyo Metro
- Line: Chiyoda Line
- Platforms: 1 island platform
- Tracks: 2

Construction
- Structure type: Underground

Other information
- Station code: C-13

History
- Opened: 20 December 1969; 56 years ago

Services
Preceding station	Tokyo Metro	Following station
Shin-ochanomizu towards Yoyogi-Uehara	Chiyoda Line	Nezu towards Kita-Ayase
Location
- Location within Tokyo Yamanote Loop Location within Tokyo wards area Location within Japan

Yushima Station (湯島駅, Yushima-eki) is a subway station on the Tokyo Metro Chiyoda Line in the Bunkyo-ku, Tokyo, Japan, operated by the Tokyo subway operator Tokyo Metro. It is located near Shinobazu Pond and Ueno Park.

== Lines ==
Yushima Station is served by the Tokyo Metro Chiyoda Line. Through services operate to and from the Odakyu Odawara Line to the south and the JR Joban Line to the north. It is also relatively close to Ueno-hirokoji Station on the Tokyo Metro Ginza Line and Ueno-Okachimachi Station on the Toei Ōedo Line (around 350 meters northeast), although it is not officially recognized as a transfer station and there is no transfer corridor between the three stations.

== Station layout ==
The station consists of one island platform serving two tracks.

=== Platforms ===
1	Chiyoda Line	for Otemachi and Yoyogi-uehara; Odakyu Odawara Line for Hon-Atsugi and Isehara
2	Chiyoda Line	for Kita-senju, Ayase and Kita-ayase; Jōban Line for Abiko and Toride

== History ==
Yushima Station was opened on 20 December 1969 by the Teito Rapid Transit Authority (TRTA).

The station facilities were inherited by Tokyo Metro after the privatization of the TRTA in 2004.

== Surrounding area ==
- Shinobazu Pond and Ueno Park
- Ueno
- Akihabara
- Ueno-hirokoji Station, Suehirochō Station ( Tokyo Metro Ginza Line)
- Ueno-okachimachi Station ( Toei Ōedo Line)
- Yushima Tenmangu Shrine
