= Suehirocho Station (Tokyo) =

Metro station in Tokyo, Japan

Coordinates: 35.702962°N 139.771671°E

Suehirocho Station 末広町駅

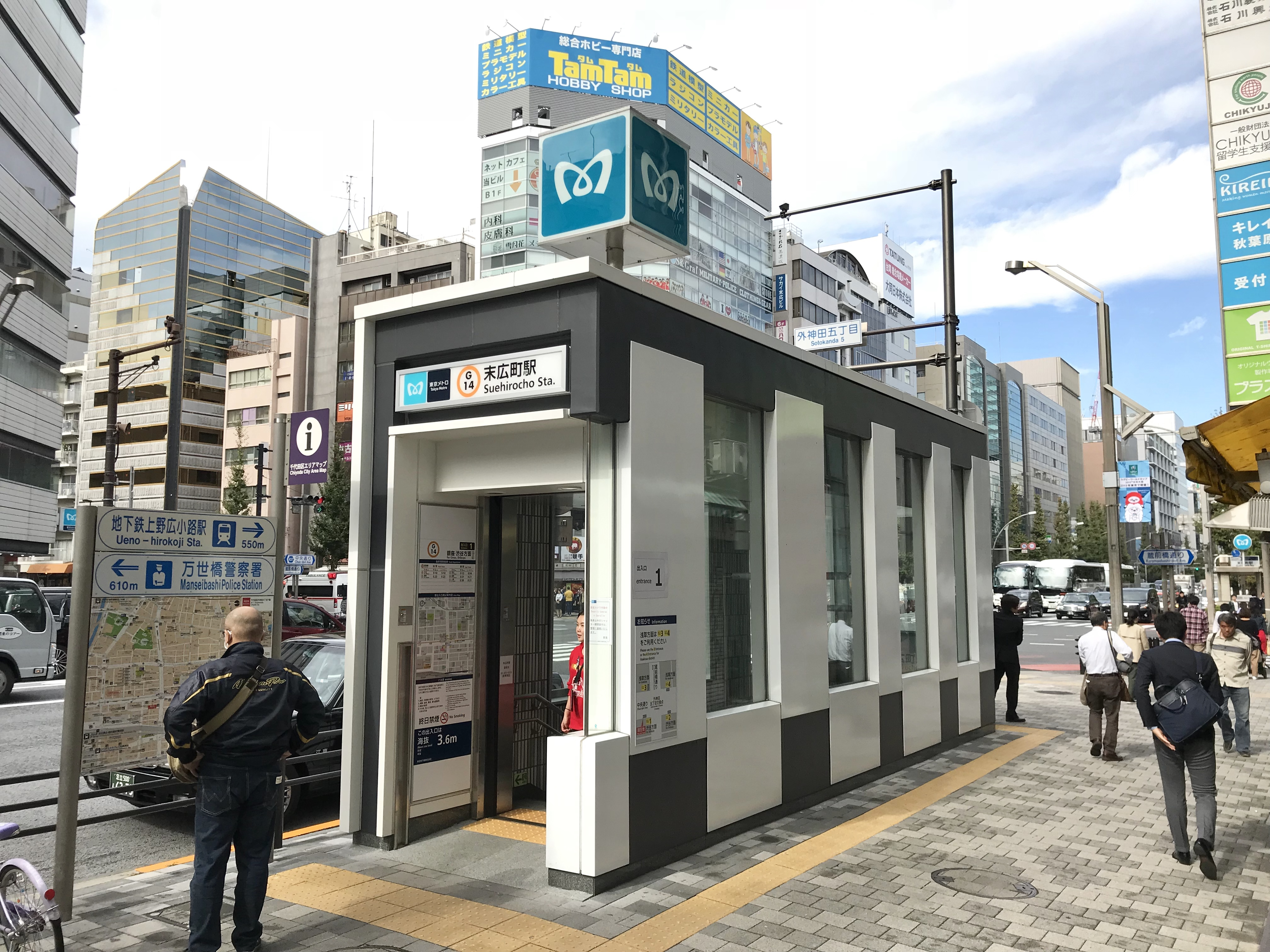
- Exit1 in October 2018

Japanese name
- Shinjitai: 末広町駅
- Kyūjitai: 末廣甼驛
- Hiragana: すえひろちょうえき

General information
- Location: 4-7-3 Sotokanda, Chiyoda, Tokyo; Japan
- Operator: Tokyo Metro
- Line: Ginza Line
- Platforms: 2 side platforms
- Tracks: 2

Construction
- Structure type: Underground

Other information
- Station code: G-14

History
- Opened: 1 January 1930; 96 years ago

Passengers
- 2018: 25,626 daily

Services
Preceding station	Tokyo Metro	Following station
Kanda towards Shibuya	Ginza Line	Ueno-hirokoji towards Asakusa
Location
- Location within Tokyo Yamanote Loop Location within Tokyo wards area Location within Japan

Suehirocho Station (末広町駅, Suehirochō-eki) is a subway station on the Tokyo Metro Ginza Line in Chiyoda, Tokyo, Japan, operated by the Tokyo subway operator Tokyo Metro. It is numbered "G-14".

== Lines ==
Suehirocho Station is served by the Tokyo Metro Ginza Line from Shibuya to Asakusa.

== Station layout ==
The station has two side platforms located on the first basement (B1F) level, serving two tracks. The station has ticket gates at the entrances to the platforms.

As there is no underground concourse connecting the two platforms, both platforms have their own pair of exits. Platform 1 is served by exits 1 and 2, while platform 2 is served by exits 3 and 4. Passengers wishing to switch platforms must return to street level and cross Chuo-dori to reach the entrances for the other platform.

=== Platforms ===
1	Ginza Line	for Shimbashi and Shibuya
2	Ginza Line	for Ueno and Asakusa

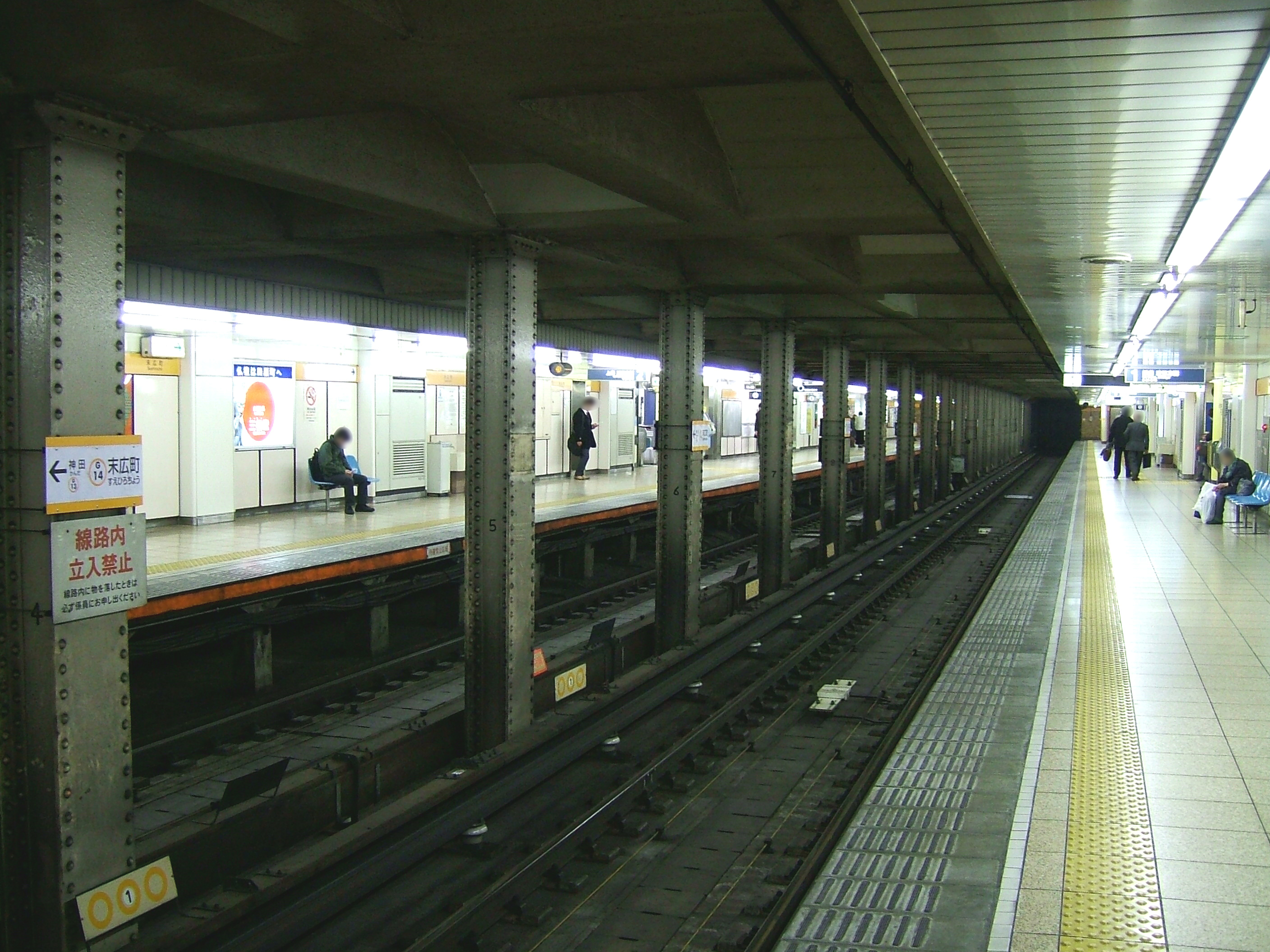
The platforms, 2006 (Platform 1 on the right, Platform 2 on the left)

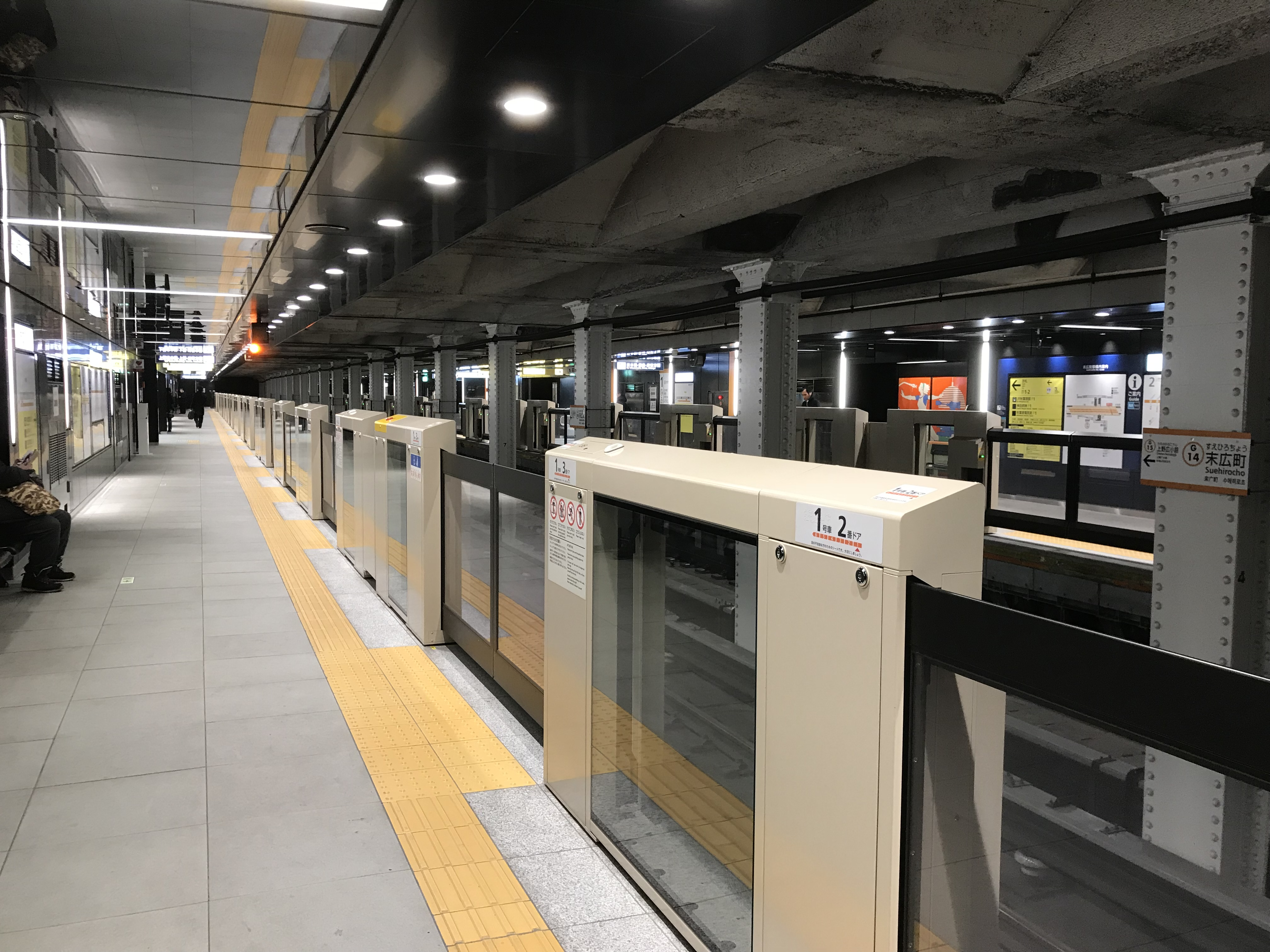
The same platforms in 2018

== History ==
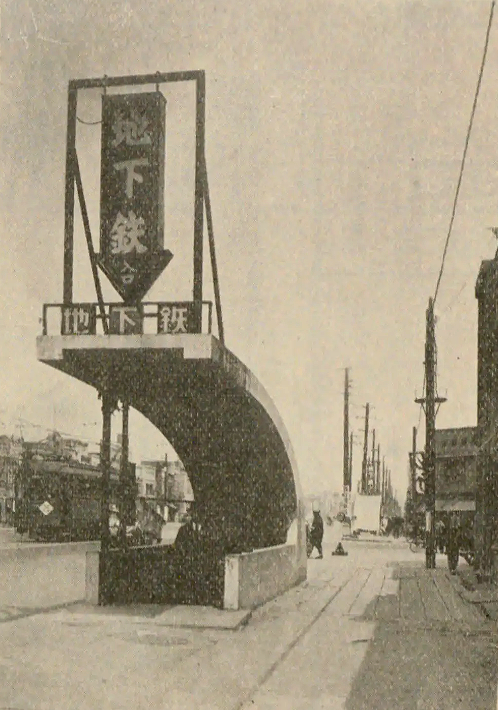
Suehirocho station in the 1930s

Suehirocho Station opened as the Tokyo Underground Railway on 1 January 1930.

The station facilities were inherited by Tokyo Metro after the privatization of the Teito Rapid Transit Authority (TRTA) in 2004.

== Passenger statistics ==
In fiscal 2011, the station was used by an average of 20,426 passengers daily. By 2018, this had risen to 25,626.

== Surrounding area ==
JR East's Akihabara Station is within walking distance of this station.

- Akihabara
- Kanda Shrine
