= Ueno-hirokoji Station =

Metro station in Tokyo, Japan

Coordinates: 35.707985°N 139.773061°E

Ueno-hirokoji Station 上野広小路駅

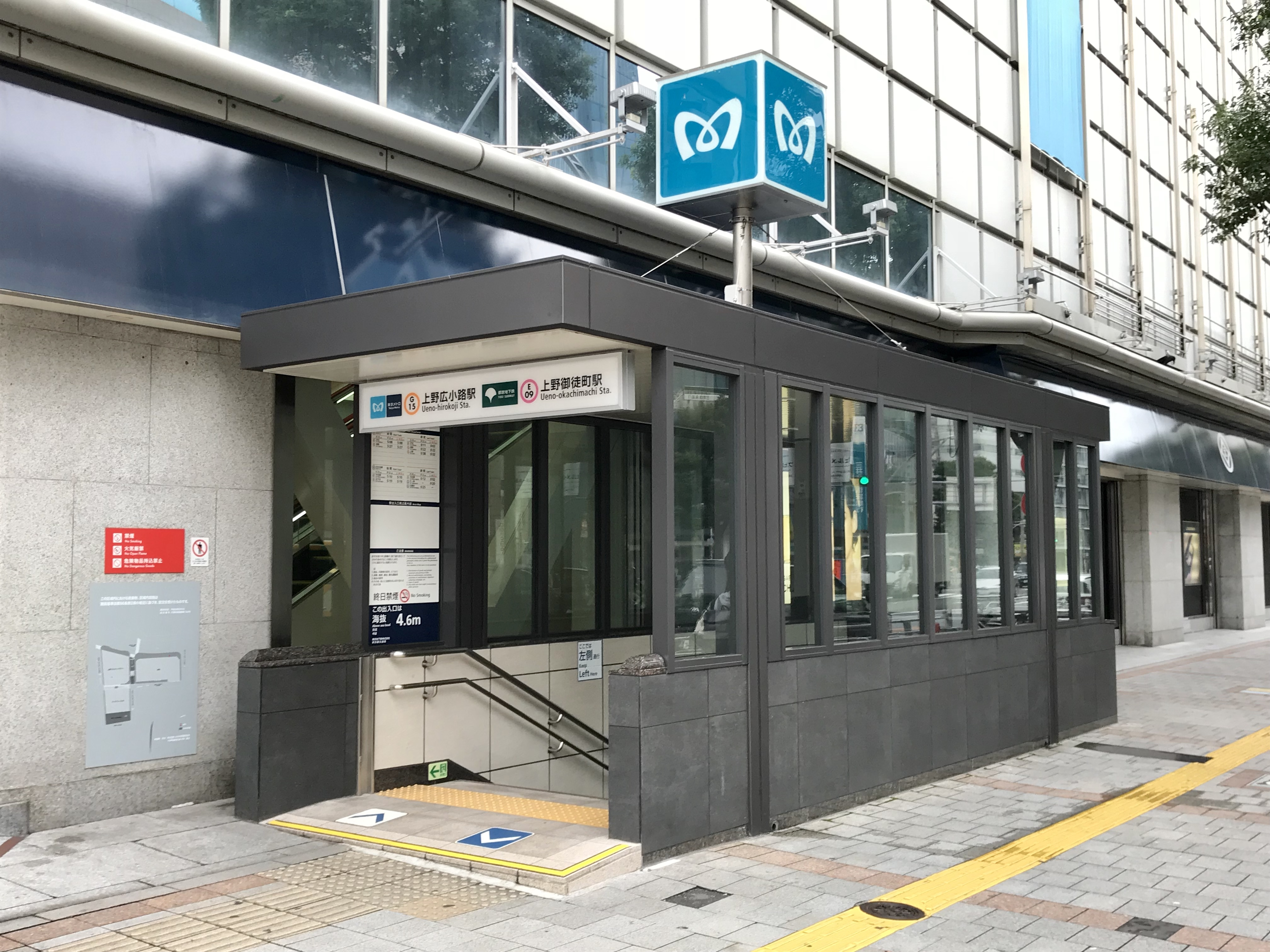
- ExitA2 in October 2018

Japanese name
- Shinjitai: 上野広小路駅
- Kyūjitai: 上埜廣小路驛
- Hiragana: うえのひろこうじえき

General information
- Location: 3-29-3 Ueno, Taitō City, Tokyo; Japan
- Operator: Tokyo Metro
- Line: Ginza Line
- Platforms: 2 side platforms
- Tracks: 2
- Connections: Ueno-okachimachi

Construction
- Structure type: Underground

Other information
- Station code: G-15

History
- Opened: 1 January 1930; 96 years ago

Passengers
- FY2011: 21,631 daily

Services
Preceding station	Tokyo Metro	Following station
Suehirocho towards Shibuya	Ginza Line	Ueno towards Asakusa
Location
- Location within Tokyo Yamanote Loop Location within Tokyo wards area Location within Japan

Ueno-hirokoji Station (上野広小路駅, Ueno-hirokōji-eki) is a subway station on the Tokyo Metro Ginza Line, in Taitō, Tokyo, Japan, operated by the Tokyo subway operator Tokyo Metro. It is numbered "G-15".

== Lines ==
Ueno-hirokoji Station is served by the Tokyo Metro Ginza Line from Shibuya to Asakusa. It also provides connections to Ueno-Okachimachi Station on the Toei Ōedo Line, Okachimachi Station on the Yamanote Line, and Naka-Okachimachi Station on the Tokyo Metro Hibiya Line.

== Station layout ==
The station has two side platforms located on the first basement (B1F) level, serving two tracks.

=== Platforms ===
1	Ginza Line	for Shimbashi and Shibuya
2	Ginza Line	for Ueno and Asakusa

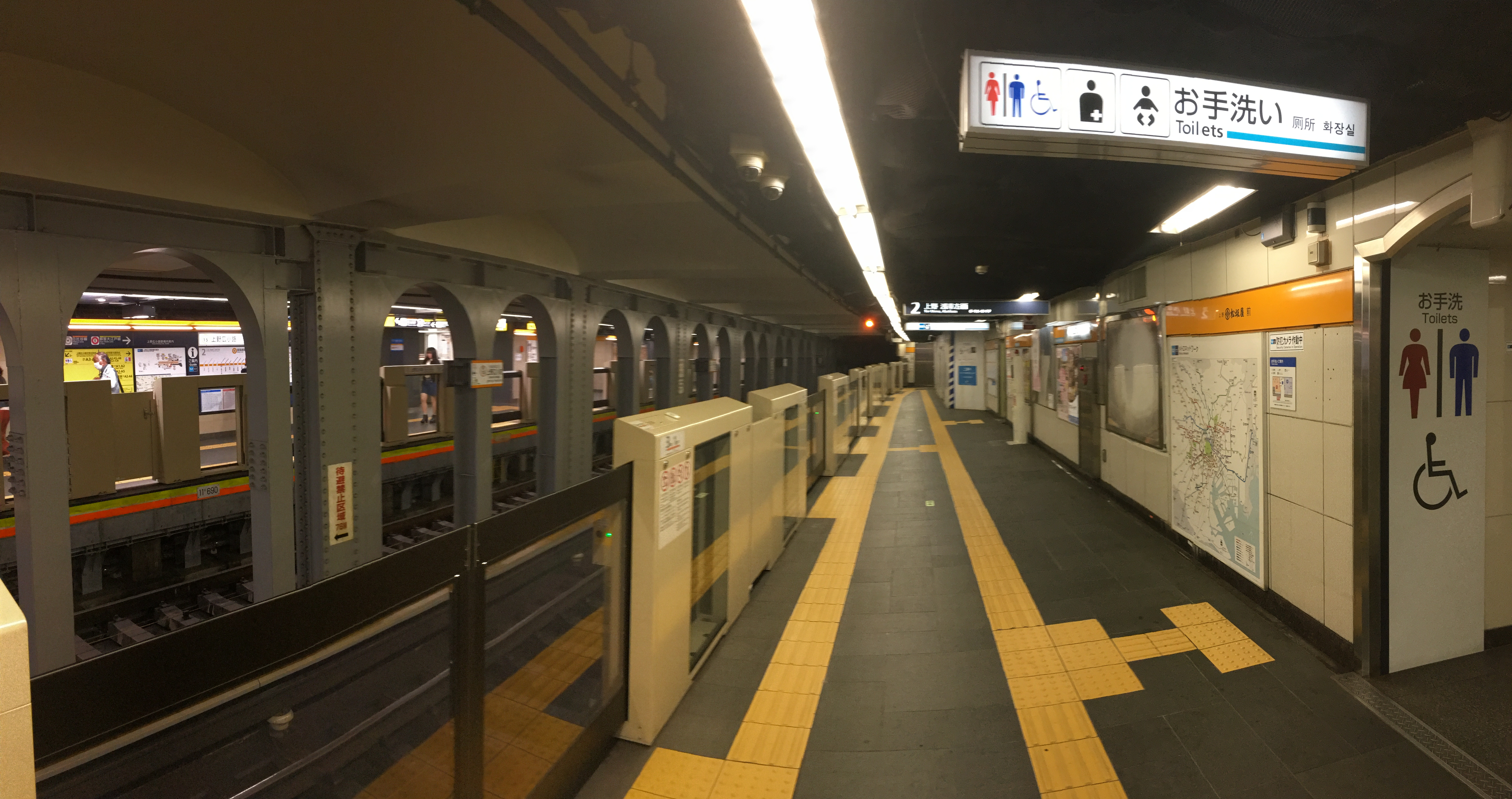
Platforms in 2019

== History ==
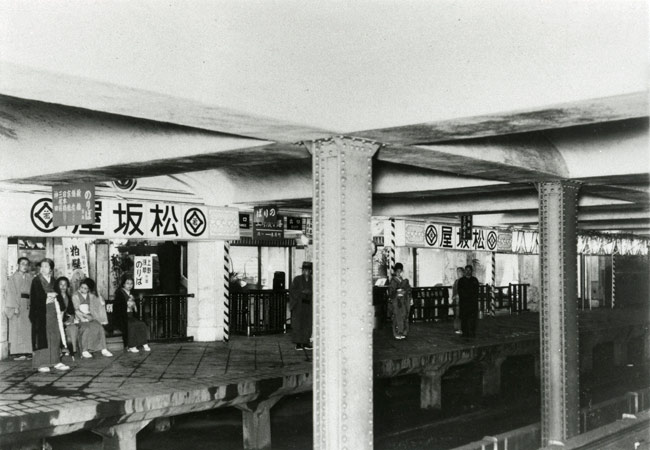
The station platform circa 1930, featuring its direct connection to the Matsuzakaya Ueno Department Store.

The Tokyo Underground Railway Ueno-hirokoji Station opened on 1 January 1930.

The station facilities were inherited by Tokyo Metro after the privatization of the Teito Rapid Transit Authority (TRTA) in 2004.

== Passenger statistics ==
In fiscal 2011, the station was used by an average of 21,631 passengers daily.
