= Okachimachi Station =

Railway station in Tokyo, Japan

Coordinates: 35.707327°N 139.774847°E

JY04 JK29 Okachimachi Station 御徒町駅
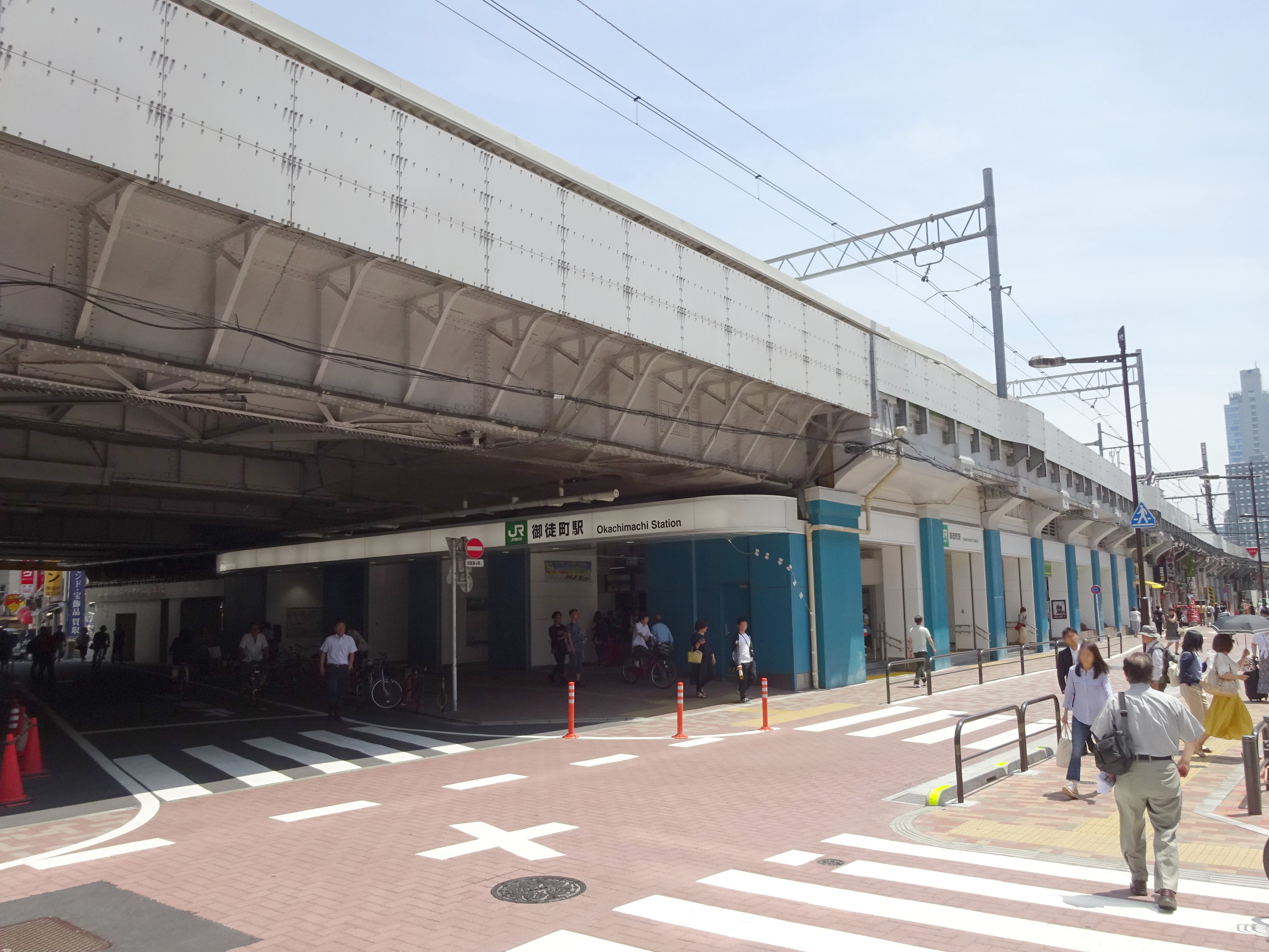
- The South entrance in June 2017

General information
- Location: 5 Ueno District, Taitō City, Tokyo; Japan
- Operator: JR East
- Lines: Yamanote Line; Keihin-Tōhoku Line
- Platforms: 2 island platforms
- Tracks: 4
- Connections: Ueno-okachimachi

Construction
- Structure type: Elevated
- Accessible: Yes

Other information
- Station code: JY04 (Yamanote Line); JK29 (Keihin-Tōhoku Line)

History
- Opened: 1 November 1925; 100 years ago

Passengers
- FY2024: 125,968 (daily)

Services
| Preceding station | JR East | Following station |
|---|---|---|
| Akihabara Next clockwise | Yamanote Line | Ueno Next counter-clockwise |
| Akihabara towards Yokohama | Keihin–Tōhoku Line Rapid (weekends, holidays); Local | Ueno towards Ōmiya |
Location
- Location within Tokyo Yamanote Loop Location within Tokyo wards area Location within Japan

Okachimachi Station (御徒町駅, Okachimachi-eki) is a railway station in Taito, Tokyo, Japan, operated by East Japan Railway Company (JR East).

== Lines ==
Okachimachi Station is served by the circular Yamanote Line and also the Keihin-Tohoku Line. Although not physically connected, Naka-Okachimachi on the Tokyo Metro Hibiya Line, Ueno-hirokōji on the Tokyo Metro Ginza Line, and Ueno-okachimachi on the Toei Oedo Line are within walking distance of Okachimachi and marked as interchanges on route maps.

== Station layout ==
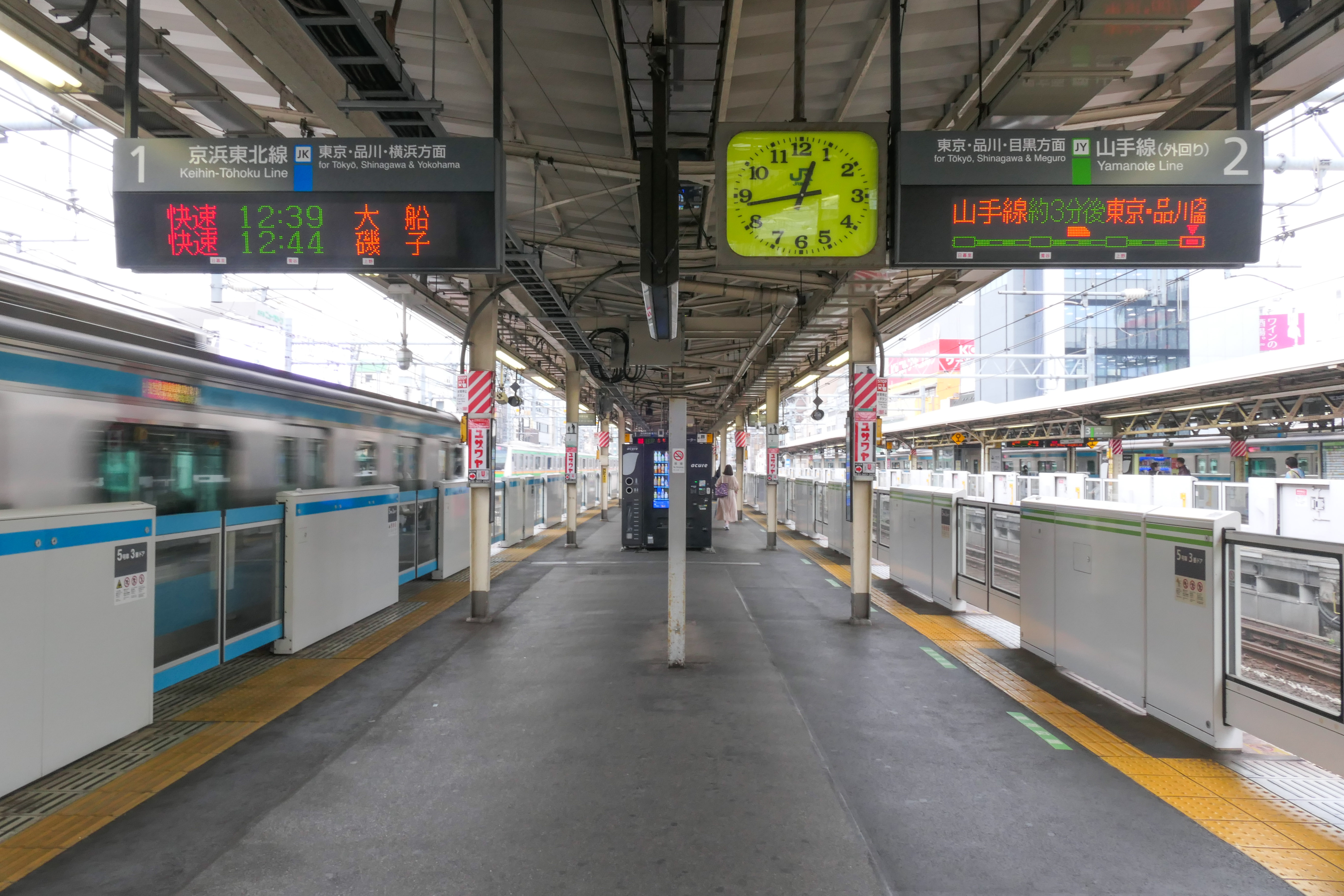
The station platforms, June 2021

The station is on a raised viaduct running in a roughly north-south direction. There are two exits, the north exit (北口) and south exit (南口). Both exits have ticket vending machines and toilets; however, the north exit has a Midori no Madoguchi staffed ticket office and escalators to the platforms. Luggage lockers are available at the south exit.

=== Platforms ===
The station has two island platforms with two tracks on either side of each platform. Platforms 1 and 4 (the outermost tracks) serve the Keihin-Tohoku Line, while platforms 2 and 3 (the inner tracks) are used for Yamanote Line trains. This platform arrangement allows for easy cross-platform interchanges so that passengers may transfer between lines in the same direction by walking across the platform.

East of the platforms lie tracks of the Ueno-Tokyo Line. These are themselves built on former tracks of the Tohoku Main Line running to Tokyo Station, that had been used for stabling trains when construction of the Tohoku Shinkansen took over land near Kanda Station previously used by the Tohoku Main Line, forcing services to terminate at Ueno Station instead.

| 1 | Keihin-Tohoku Line | for Tokyo, Yokohama, and Ōfuna |
| 2 | Yamanote Line | for Tokyo and Shinagawa |
| 3 | Yamanote Line | for Ueno and Ikebukuro |
| 4 | Keihin-Tohoku Line | for Ueno, Akabane, and Ōmiya |

The Yamanote Line platforms are equipped with chest-high platform edge doors, installed in March 2014.

== History ==
The station opened on 1 November 1925. Waist-high platform edge doors were installed on the Yamanote Line platforms in March 2014, scheduled to be brought into operation from 10 May. From 14 March 2015, rapid services on the Keihin-Tohoku Line began serving the station on weekends and national holidays only.

Station numbering was introduced in 2016 with Okachimachi being assigned station numbers JY04 for the Yamanote line and JK29 for the Keihin-Tōhoku line.

== Passenger statistics ==
In fiscal 2013, the station was used by an average of 67,593 passengers daily (boarding passengers only), making it the 64th-busiest station operated by JR East. The daily average passenger figures (boarding passengers only) in previous years are as shown below.

| Fiscal year | Daily average |
|---|---|
| 2000 | 79,539 |
| 2005 | 77,011 |
| 2010 | 69,565 |
| 2011 | 68,402 |
| 2012 | 67,737 |
| 2013 | 67,593 |

== Surrounding area ==
Okachimachi Station is in the centre of a busy commercial district stretching southwards from Ueno Station. Particularly well-known is Ameya-Yokochō ("Ameyoko"), a busy shopping street dominated by small market-style stalls selling a wide variety of wares. Ameyoko runs parallel to the railway line and includes a large market under the railway tracks.

The station is also very near Ueno Park's south entrance.

== See also ==
- List of railway stations in Japan
