= Ueno-okachimachi Station =

Metro station in Taito, Tokyo, Japan

Coordinates: 35.707894°N 139.774337°E

Ueno-okachimachi Station 上野御徒町駅

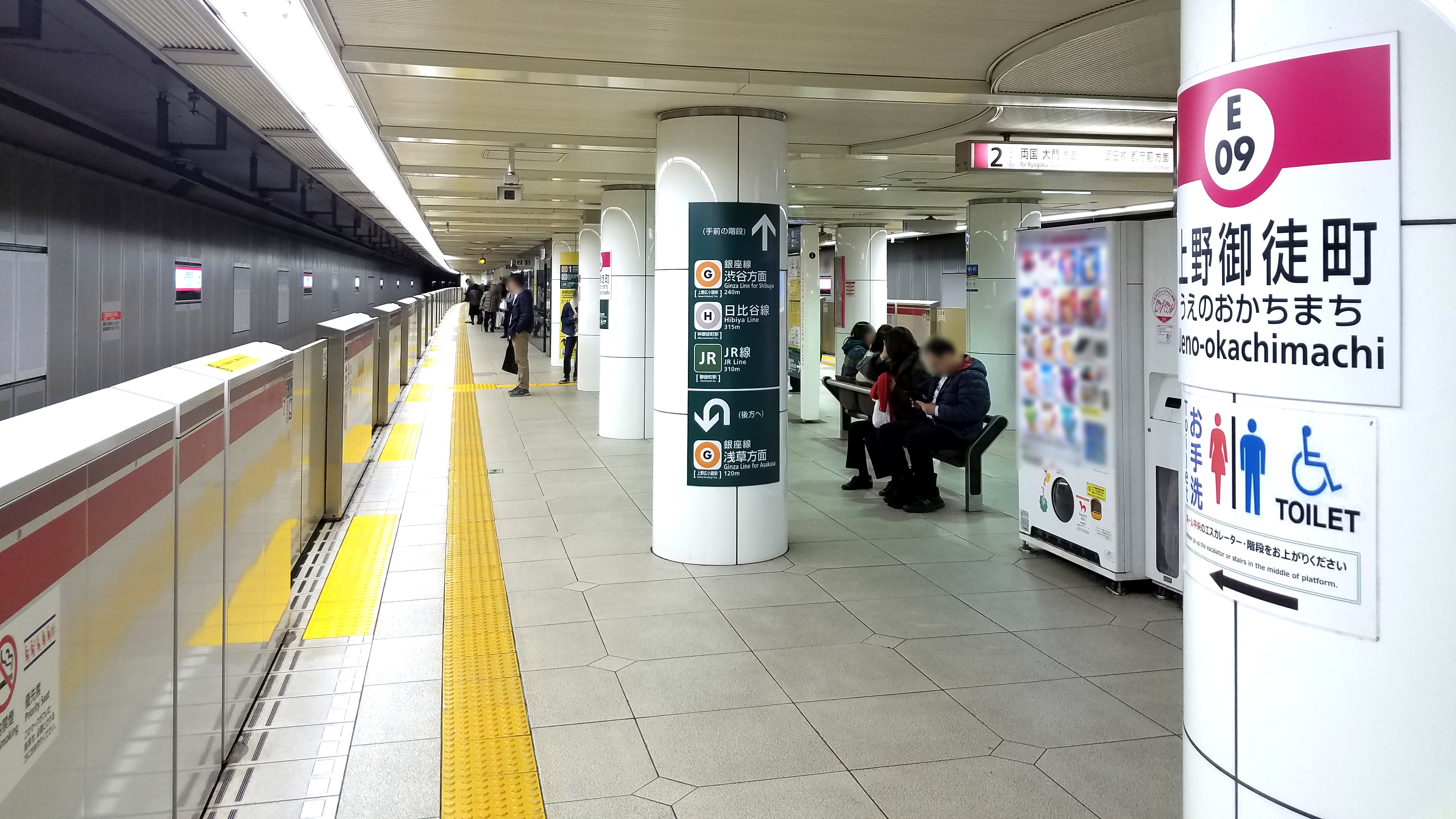
- Station platforms

General information
- Location: 5-26-6 Ueno, Taitō City, Tokyo; Japan
- Operator: Toei Subway
- Line: Ōedo Line
- Platforms: 1 island platform
- Tracks: 2
- Connections: Ueno-hirokoji; Naka-okachimachi; Yushima; JK29 JY04 Okachimachi

Construction
- Structure type: Underground

Other information
- Station code: E-09

History
- Opened: 12 December 2000; 25 years ago

Services
Preceding station	Toei Subway	Following station
Hongō-sanchōme towards Tochōmae	Ōedo Line	Shin-okachimachi towards Hikarigaoka
Location
- Location within Tokyo Yamanote Loop Location within Tokyo wards area Location within Japan

Ueno-okachimachi Station (上野御徒町駅, Ueno-okachimachi-eki) is a subway station in Taitō, Tokyo, Japan, operated by the Tokyo subway operator Toei Subway. It is numbered E-09.

== Lines ==
Ueno-okachimachi Station is served by the Toei Ōedo Line. The station provides transfers to:

- Okachimachi Station on the Yamanote Line and Keihin-Tōhoku Line
- Ueno-hirokōji Station on the Tokyo Metro Ginza Line
- Naka-okachimachi Station on the Tokyo Metro Hibiya Line
- Yushima Station on the Tokyo Metro Chiyoda Line

== Station layout ==
The station consists of an island platform serving two tracks.

=== Platforms ===
1	Ōedo Line	for Iidabashi and Tochomae (Transfer at Tochōmae for Nerima, Hikarigaoka, and Roppongi)
2	Ōedo Line	for Ryōgoku and Daimon

== History ==
Ueno-okachimachi Station opened on 12 December 2000.
