= Ueno Station =

Major railway and metro station in Tokyo, Japan

Coordinates: 35.713434°N 139.776725°E

UENJU02 JK30 JY05 JJ01 Ueno Station 上野駅

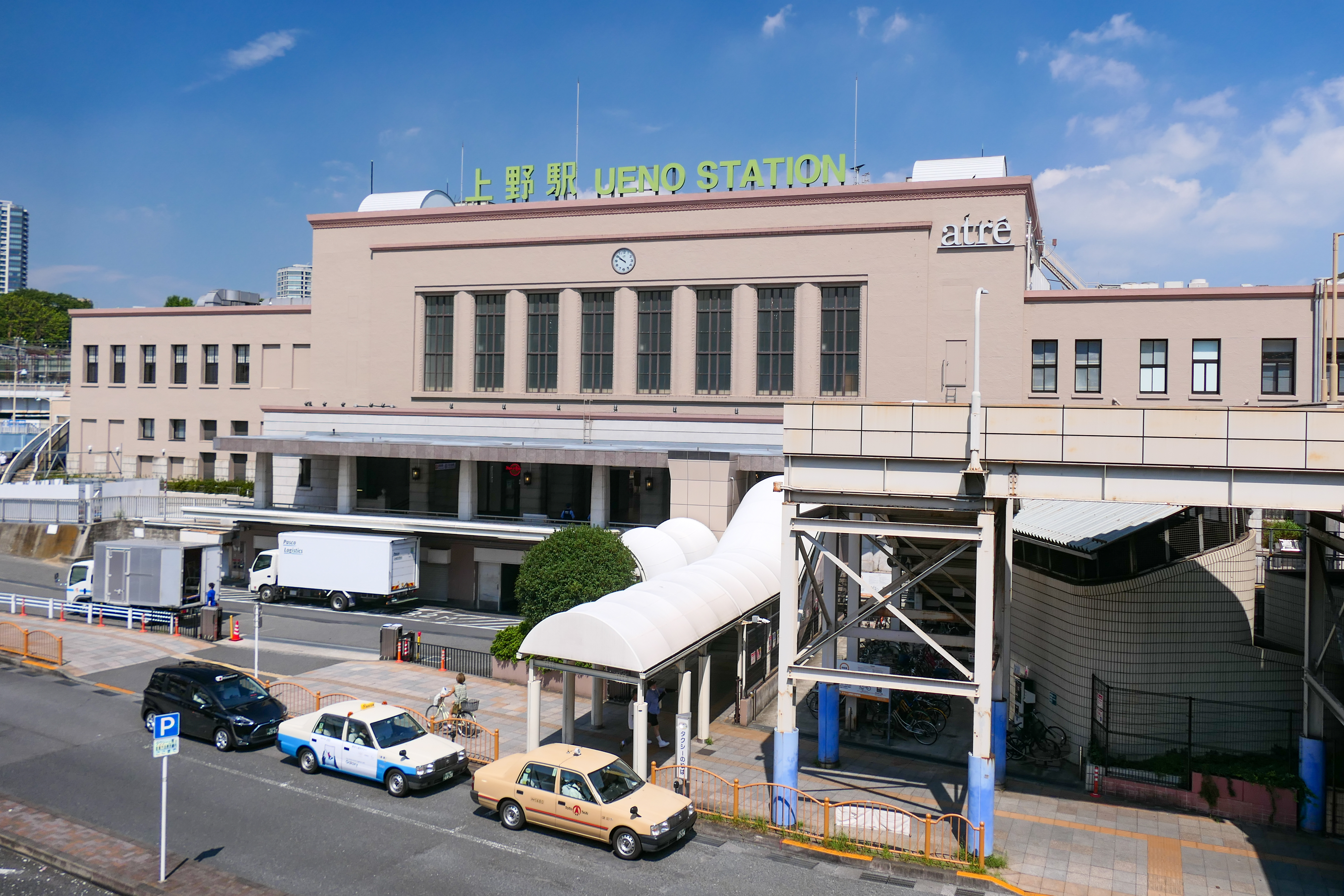
- Main building of the station

General information
- Location: 7 Ueno (JR Station); 3 Higashi-Ueno (Tokyo Metro); Taitō, Tokyo; Japan
- Operator: JR East; Tokyo Metro
- Lines: Tōhoku Shinkansen; Tōhoku Main Line; Yamanote Line; Ginza Line; Hibiya Line
- Connections: Keisei Main Line (Keisei Ueno: KS01); Bus stop

History
- Opened: 28 July 1883; 143 years ago

Passengers
- JFY2024: 340,084 daily (JR East); 189,373 daily (Tokyo Metro)

Services
Preceding station	JR East	Following station
Tokyo Terminus	Tōhoku Shinkansen Hayabusa	Ōmiya towards Shin-Aomori
Tokyo Terminus	Tōhoku Shinkansen Yamabiko	Ōmiya towards Morioka
Tokyo Terminus	Tōhoku Shinkansen Nasuno	Ōmiya towards Kōriyama
Tokyo Terminus	Yamagata Shinkansen Tsubasa	Ōmiya towards Shinjō
Tokyo Terminus	Akita Shinkansen Komachi	Ōmiya towards Akita
Tokyo Terminus	Jōetsu Shinkansen Toki	Ōmiya towards Niigata
Tokyo Terminus	Jōetsu Shinkansen Tanigawa	Ōmiya towards Gala-Yuzawa
Tokyo Terminus	Hokuriku Shinkansen Kagayaki	Ōmiya towards Nagano
Tokyo Terminus	Hokuriku Shinkansen Hakutaka	Ōmiya towards Jōetsumyōkō
Tokyo Terminus	Hokuriku Shinkansen Asama	Ōmiya towards Nagano
Other services
Preceding station	JR East	Following station
Okachimachi JY04 Next clockwise	Yamanote Line	Uguisudani JY06 Next counter-clockwise
Akihabara towards Yokohama	Keihin–Tōhoku Line Rapid (weekdays)	Tabata JK34 towards Ōmiya
Okachimachi JK29 towards Yokohama	Keihin–Tōhoku Line Rapid (weekends / holidays)	Tabata JK34 towards Ōmiya
Okachimachi JK29 towards Yokohama	Keihin–Tōhoku Line Local	Uguisudani JK31 towards Ōmiya
Terminus	Kusatsu	Akabane towards Naganohara-Kusatsuguchi
Terminus	Akagi	Akabane towards Takasaki
Tokyo One-way operation	Utsunomiya / Takasaki lines Rapid Rabbit & Urban	Akabane towards Utsunomiya or Takasaki
Tokyo Terminus	Utsunomiya / Takasaki lines Local	Oku JU03 towards Kuroiso or Maebashi
Tokyo towards Shinagawa	Hitachi	Kashiwa JJ07 (limited service) towards Sendai
Tokyo towards Shinagawa	Tokiwa	Nippori (limited service) towards Takahagi
Tokyo towards Shinagawa	Jōban Line Special Rapid	Nippori towards Tsuchiura
Tokyo towards Shinagawa	Jōban Line (Rapid) Rapid	Nippori towards Toride
Tokyo towards Shinagawa	Jōban Line Local-Futsuu	Nippori towards Sendai
Preceding station	Tokyo Metro	Following station
Ueno-hirokoji towards Shibuya	Ginza Line	Inaricho towards Asakusa
Akihabara towards Ebisu	TH Liner	Shin-Koshigaya TS20 towards Kuki
Naka-okachimachi towards Naka-meguro	Hibiya Line	Iriya towards Kita-Senju
Location
- Location within Tokyo Yamanote Loop Location within Tokyo wards area Location within Japan

Ueno Station (Japanese: 上野駅, Hepburn: Ueno-eki) is a major railway station in Tokyo's Taitō ward. It is the station used to reach the Ueno district and Ueno Park—which contains Tokyo National Museum, The National Museum of Western Art, Ueno Zoo, Tokyo University of the Arts and other famous cultural facilities. A major commuter hub, it is also the traditional terminus for long-distance trains from northern Japan, although with the extension of the Shinkansen lines to Tokyo Station this role has diminished in recent years. A similar extension of conventional lines extended Takasaki Line, Utsunomiya Line and Jōban Line services to Tokyo Station via the Ueno-Tokyo Line in March 2015, using existing little-used tracks and a new viaduct; the Ueno-Tokyo Line connects these lines with the Tōkaidō Main Line, allowing through services to Shinagawa, Yokohama, Odawara and Atami stations.

Ueno Station is close to Keisei Ueno Station, the Tokyo terminus of the Keisei Main Line to Narita Airport Station.

== Lines ==
This station is served by the following lines:

- Tokyo Metro
  - Ginza Line
  - Hibiya Line
- East Japan Railway Company
  - Tōhoku Shinkansen
  - Yamagata Shinkansen
  - Akita Shinkansen
  - Jōetsu Shinkansen
  - Hokuriku Shinkansen
  - Hokkaido Shinkansen
  - Utsunomiya Line (Tōhoku Main Line)
  - Takasaki Line
  - Keihin–Tōhoku Line
  - Yamanote Line
  - Jōban Line

As this station was the traditional point of arrival and departure for journeys to northern Japan, it became the inspiration for many poems and song lyrics, including a famous poem by Ishikawa Takuboku. There is a memorial plate about this poem in the station.

== Station layout ==
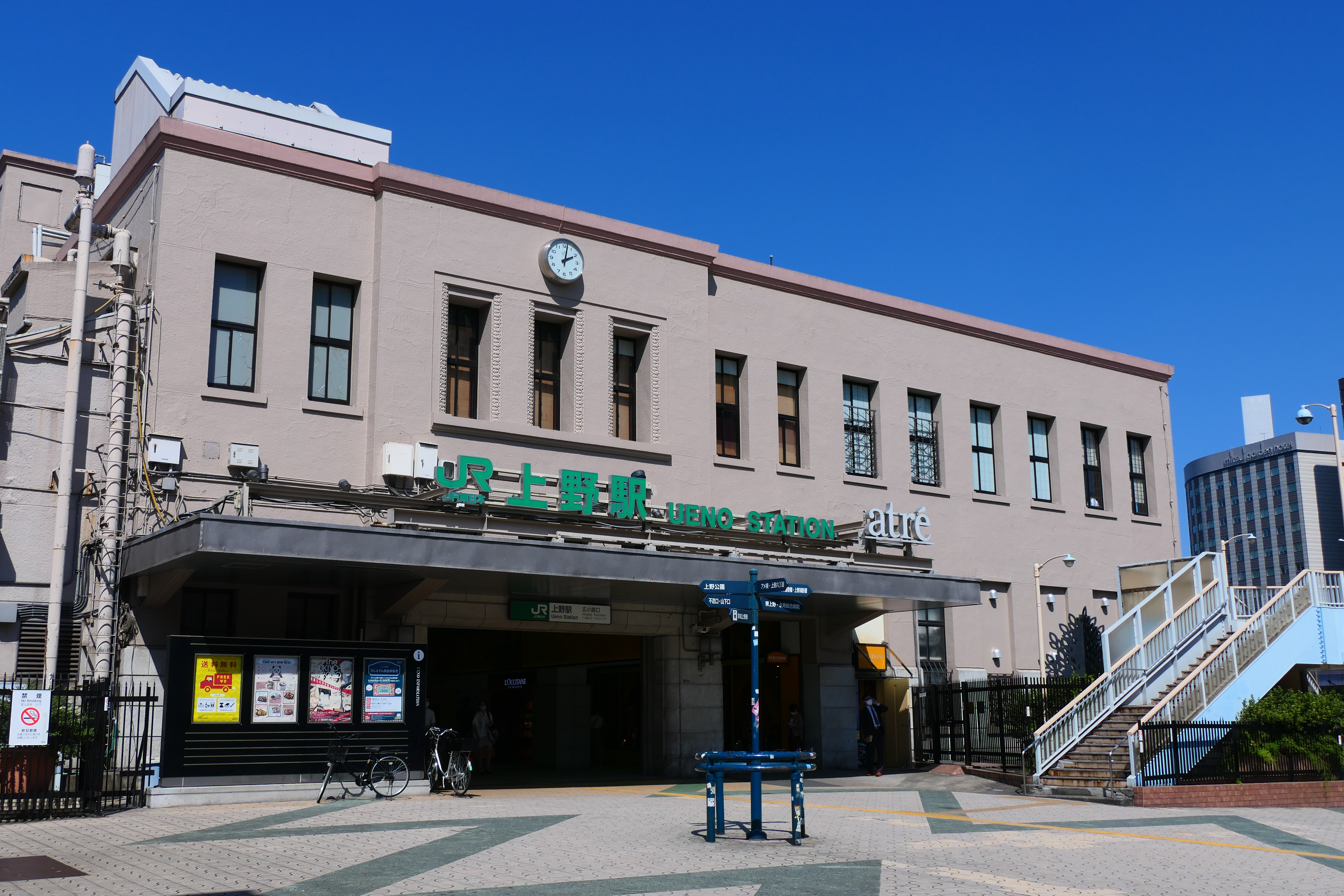
Hirokoji entrance, 2020

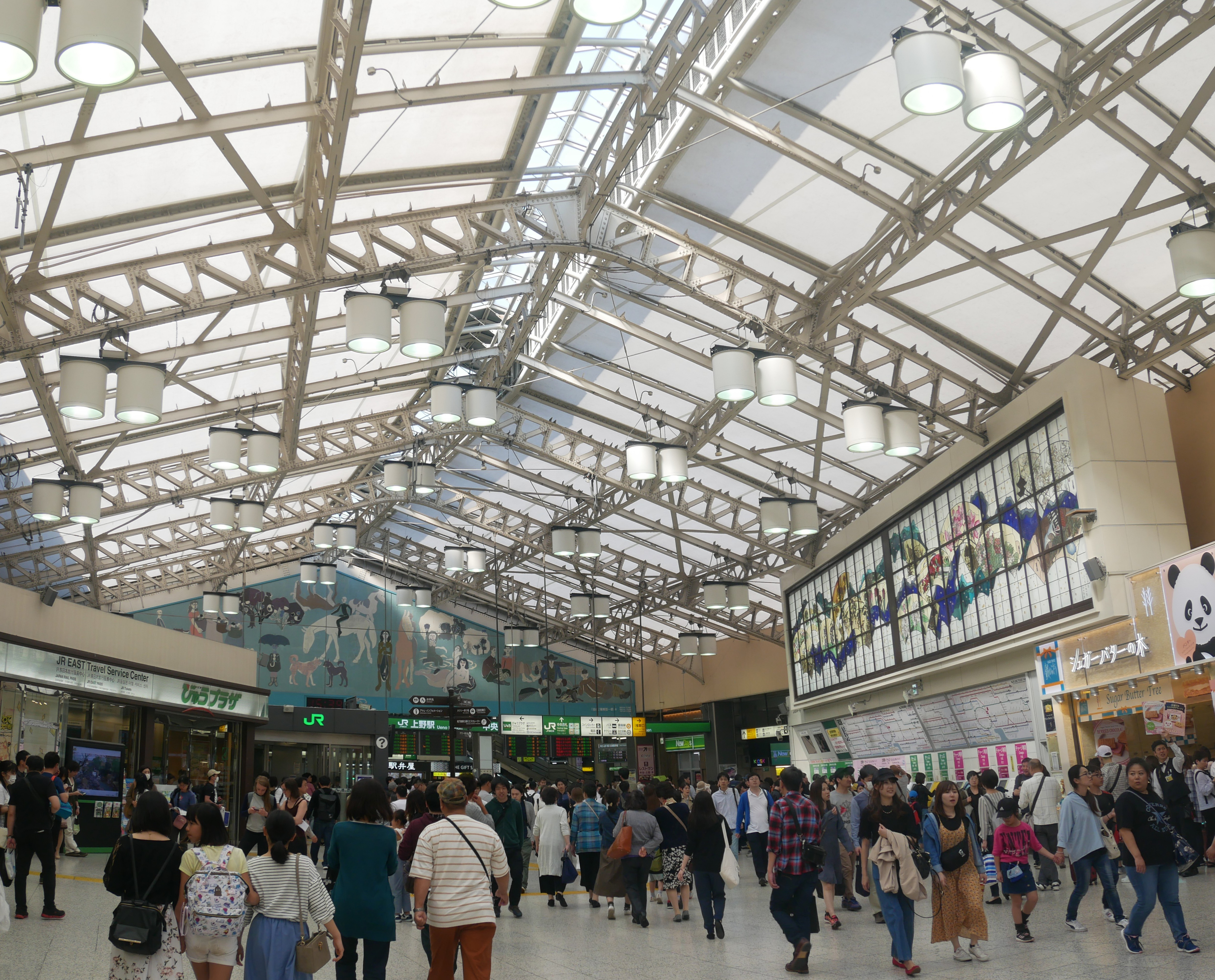
Central ticket gate, 2019

Like most major stations in Japan, Ueno Station contains and is surrounded by extensive shopping arcades. The station contains a branch of the Hard Rock Cafe.

=== JR East platforms ===
Station layout in 2009 (before removal of track 18 and construction of the Ueno-Tokyo Line)

The station has two main levels of tracks and underground platforms for the Tōhoku Shinkansen tracks. Through tracks 1 to 4 on two island platforms on the main level are used by Yamanote Line and Keihin-Tohoku Line trains. Tracks 5 to 9 on two island platforms and one side of a terminal platform lead to the Ueno-Tokyo Line to Tokyo Station and beyond on the Tōkaidō Main Line. Tracks 10 to 12 terminate inside the building, and below these on a lower deck are further terminal tracks 13 to 17 (Track No.18 has been removed). Two underground island platforms serve Shinkansen tracks 19 to 22.

Chest-high platform edge doors were installed on the two Yamanote Line platforms (2 and 3) in November 2015, and brought into use from December.

1	Keihin-Tōhoku Line	for Tabata, Akabane, Minami-Urawa, and Ōmiya
2	Yamanote Line	for Tabata, Ikebukuro, and Shinjuku
3	Yamanote Line	for Tokyo and Shinagawa
4	Keihin-Tōhoku Line	for Tokyo, Kawasaki, Yokohama; Negishi Line for Ōfuna
5-8	Utsunomiya Line	for Ōmiya, Koga, Oyama, Utsunomiya
5-8	Takasaki Line	for Ōmiya, Ageo, Kumagaya, and Takasaki
6	Jōban Line	for Matsudo, Toride, Tsuchiura, Ishioka, Tomobe, and Mito ■ Narita Line for Narita (via Abiko)
7-9	Ueno–Tokyo Line	for Tokyo, Shinagawa, Yokohama and Odawara
8	■ Jōban Line	□ Ltd. Express Hitachi / Tokiwa for Tsuchiura, Ishioka, Tomobe, Mito, Hitachi, and Iwaki
9-12	Jōban Line	for Matsudo, Toride, Tsuchiura, and Mito ■ Narita Line for Narita (via Abiko)
13-15	Utsunomiya Line	for Ōmiya, Koga, Oyama, Utsunomiya
13-15	Takasaki Line	for Ōmiya, Ageo, Kumagaya, and Takasaki
14-16	■ Takasaki Line	□ Ltd. Express Akagi / Swallow Akagi for Takasaki and Maebashi □ Ltd. Express Kusatsu for Naganohara-Kusatsuguchi
16-17	■ Jōban Line	□ Ltd. Express Hitachi / Tokiwa for Tsuchiura, Ishioka, Tomobe, Mito, Hitachi, and Iwaki
19-20	■ Tohoku Shinkansen	for Sendai, Morioka, Shin-Aomori and Shin-Hakodate-Hokuto
19-20	■ Yamagata Shinkansen	for Fukushima, Yamagata, and Shinjo
19-20	■ Akita Shinkansen	for Morioka and Akita
19-20	■ Joetsu Shinkansen	for Takasaki and Niigata
19-20	■ Hokuriku Shinkansen	for Nagano, Toyama, and Kanazawa
21-22	■ Shinkansen	for Tokyo

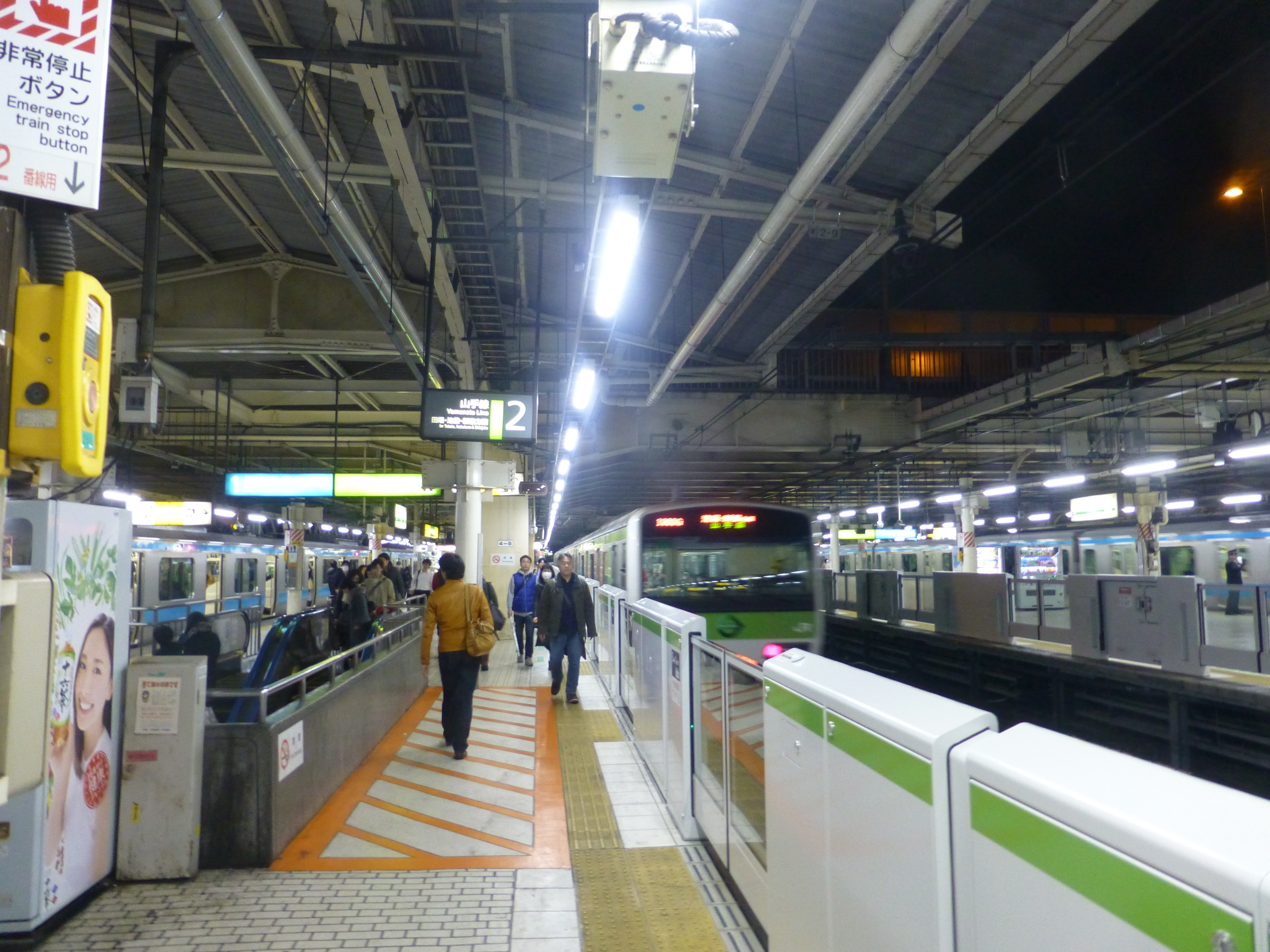
Yamanote Line platform 2 in March 2016 following the addition of low-height platform edge doors

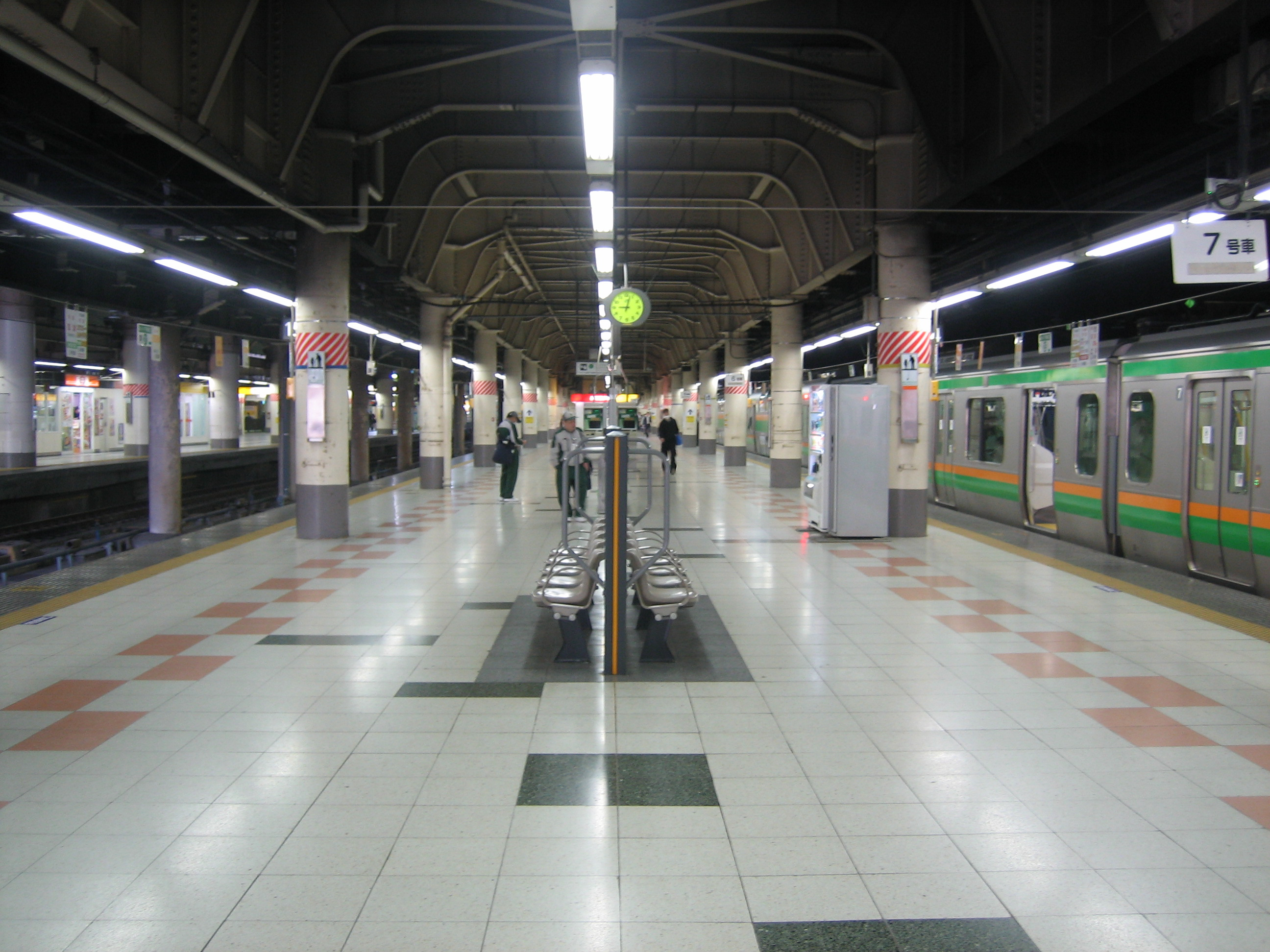
Platforms 14 and 15

=== Tokyo Metro platforms ===
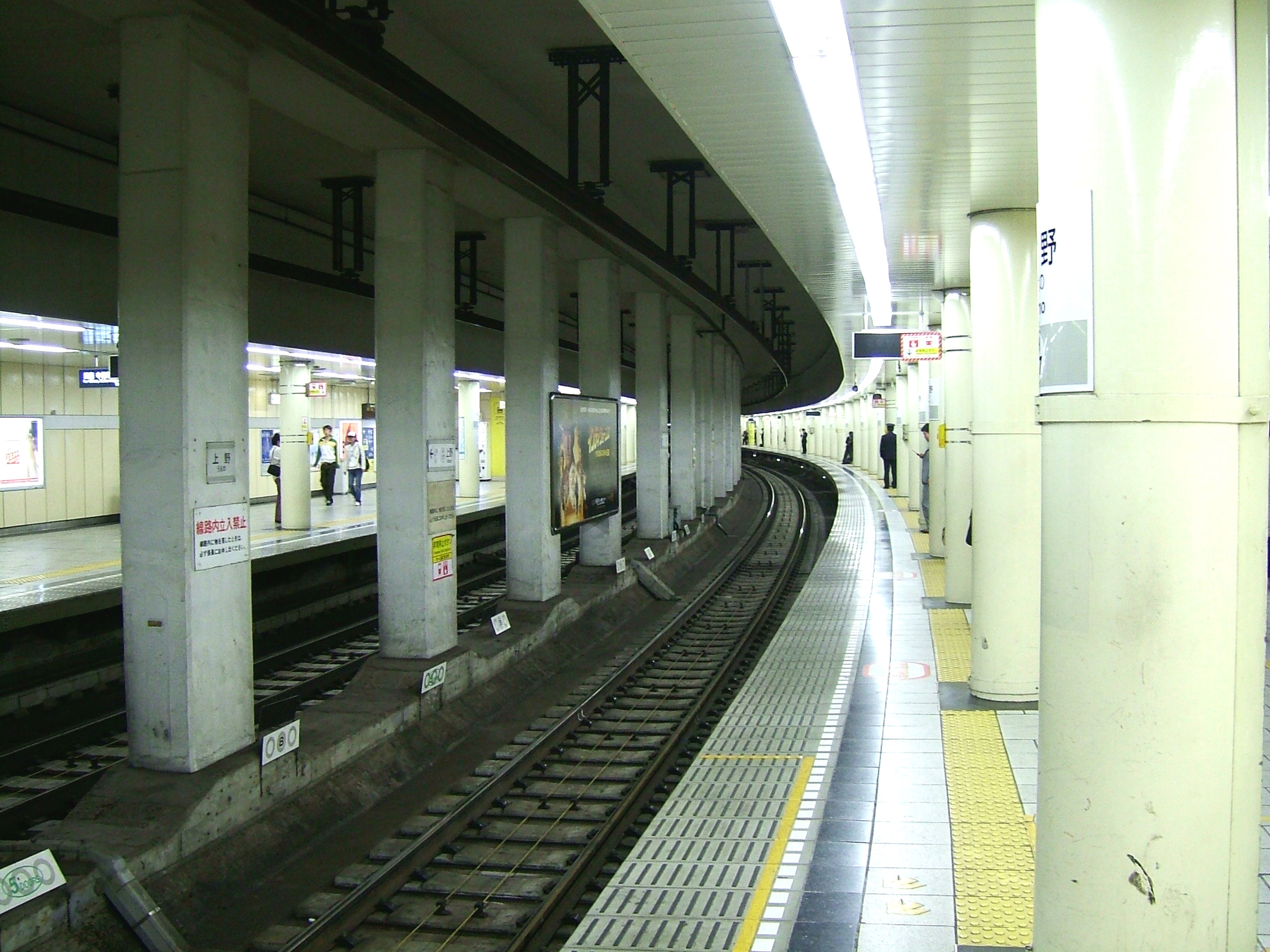
The Hibiya Line platforms in May 2008

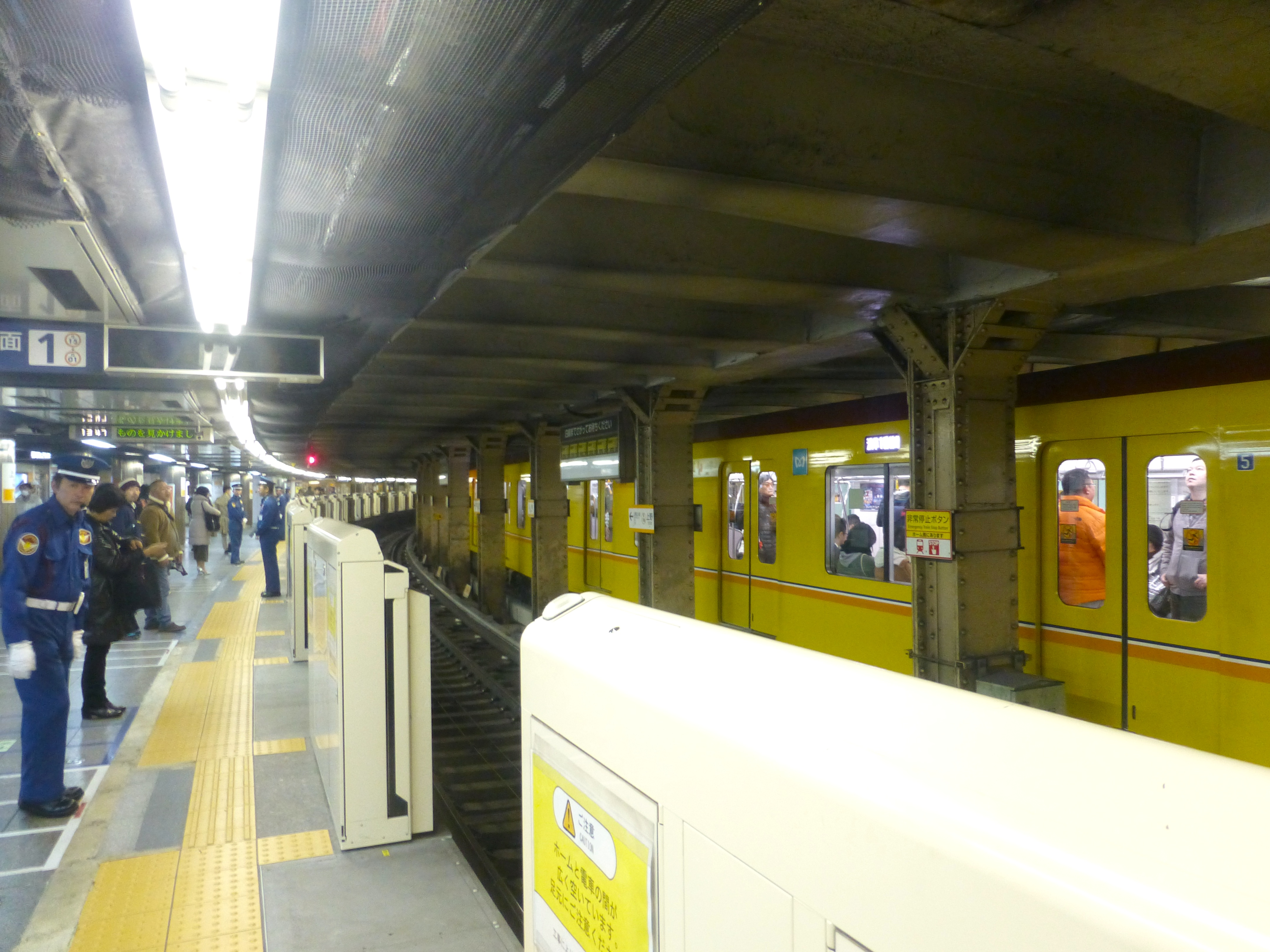
The Ginza Line platforms in January 2016

Both the Ginza and Hibiya line station have two tracks; however, unlike in other Tokyo Metro stations, each line's tracks are counted separately.

1	Hibiya Line	for Ginza, Roppongi and Naka-Meguro
2	Hibiya Line	for Kita-Senju; Tobu Skytree Line for Tōbu-Dōbutsu-Kōen; Tobu Nikko Line for Minami-Kurihashi
1	Ginza Line	for Ginza and Shibuya
2	Ginza Line	for Asakusa

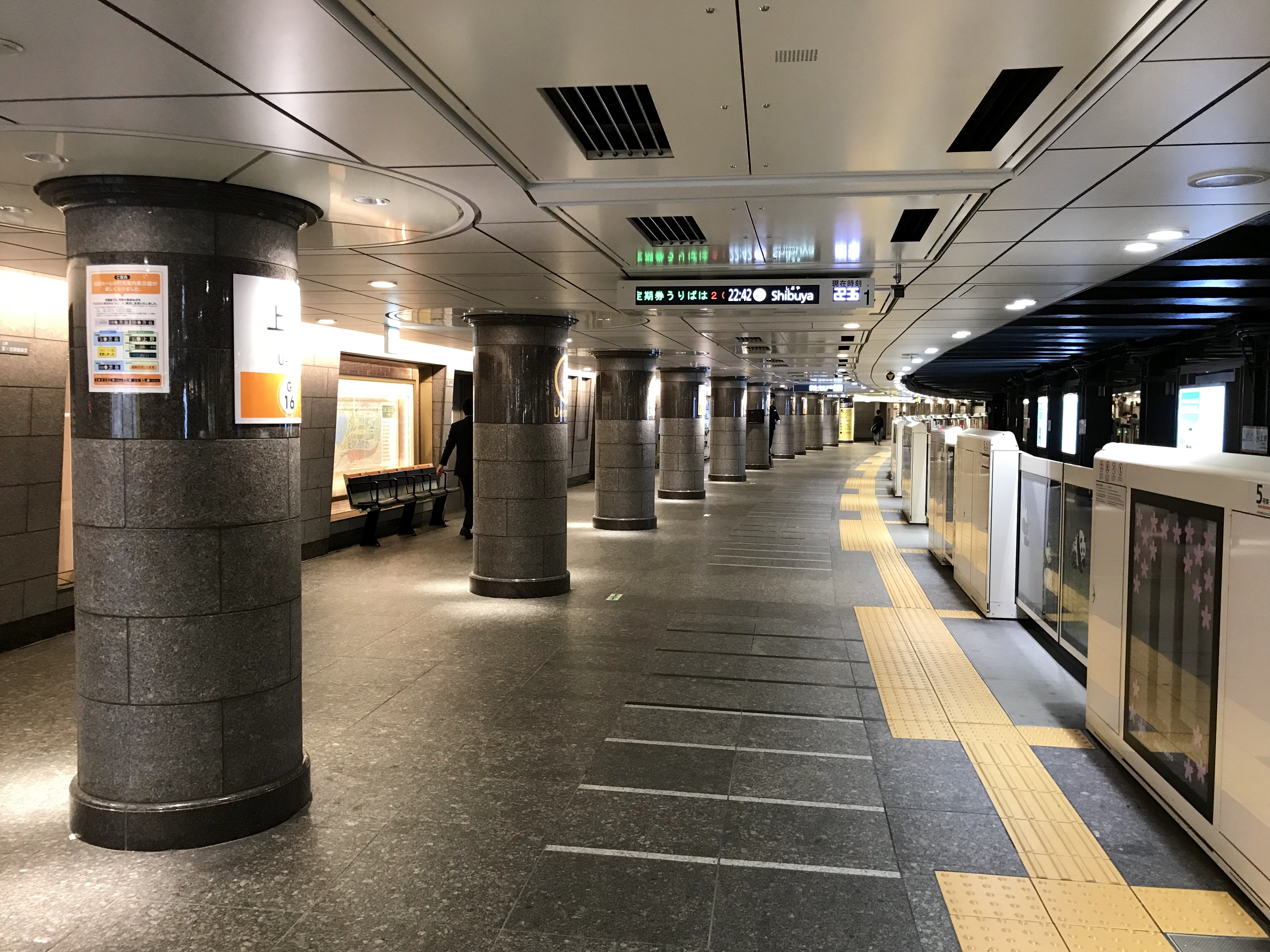
The Ginza Line platform 1 in October 2018

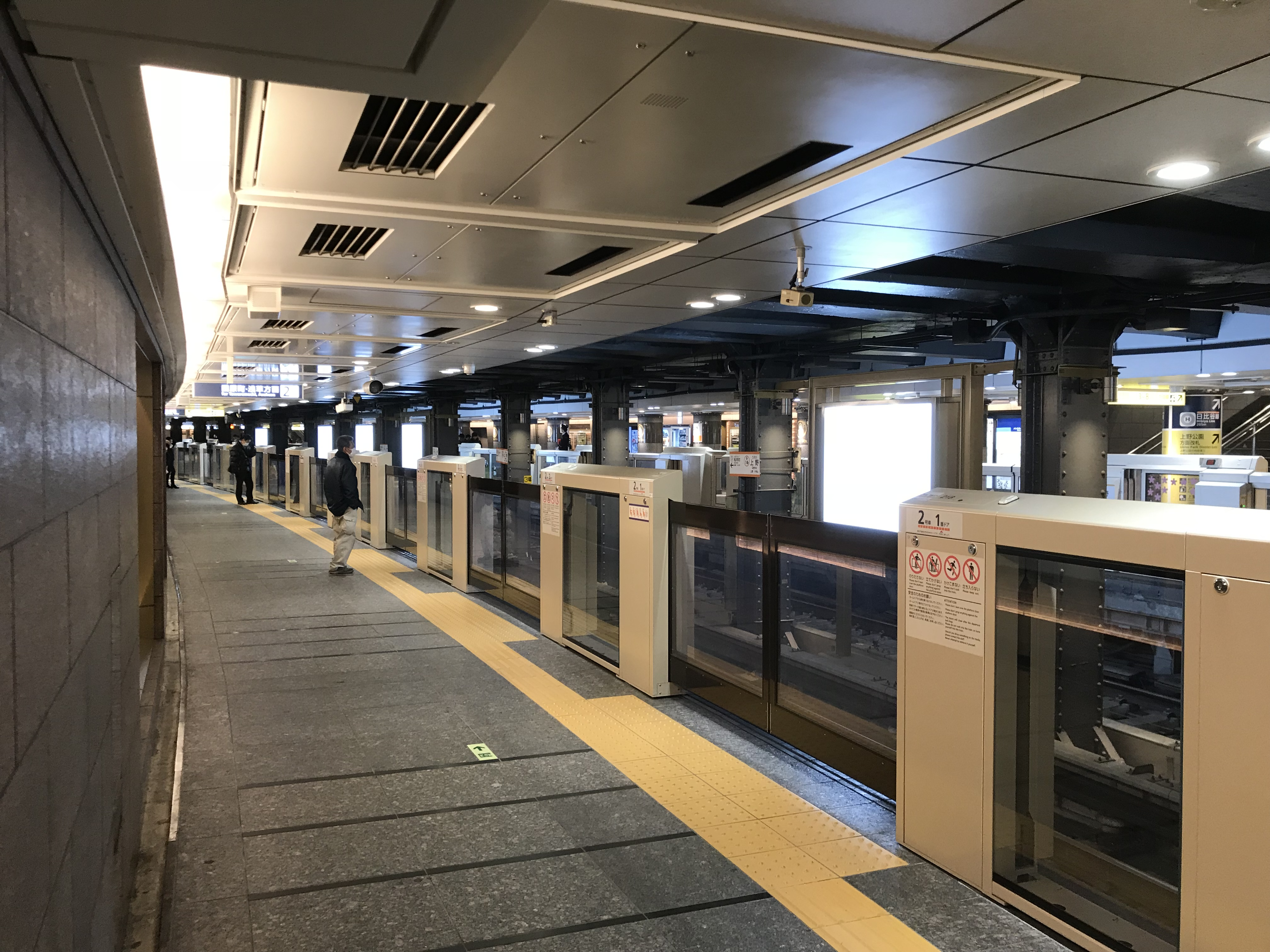
The Ginza Line platform 2 in January 2018

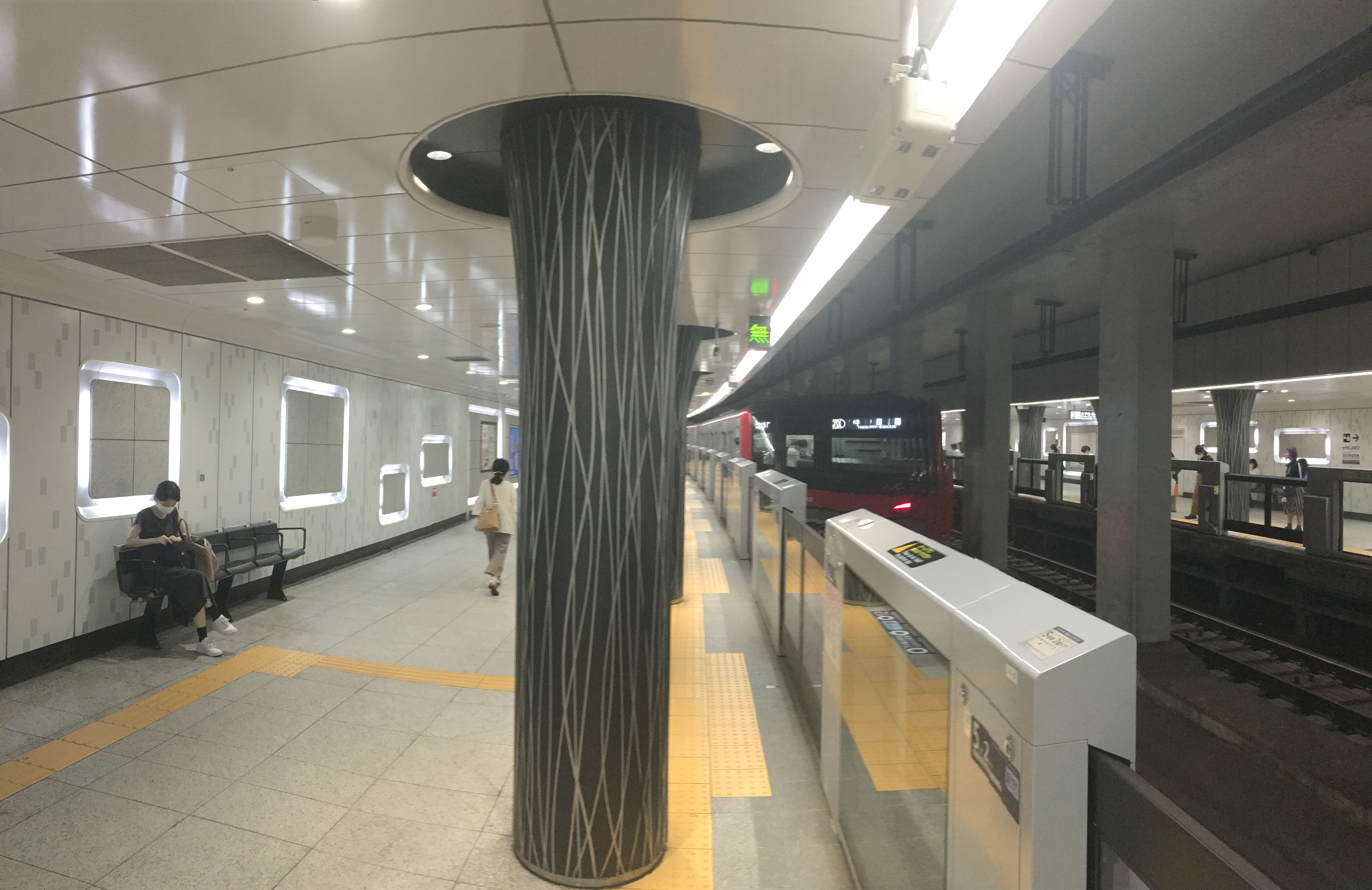
The Hibiya Line platforms in August 2021

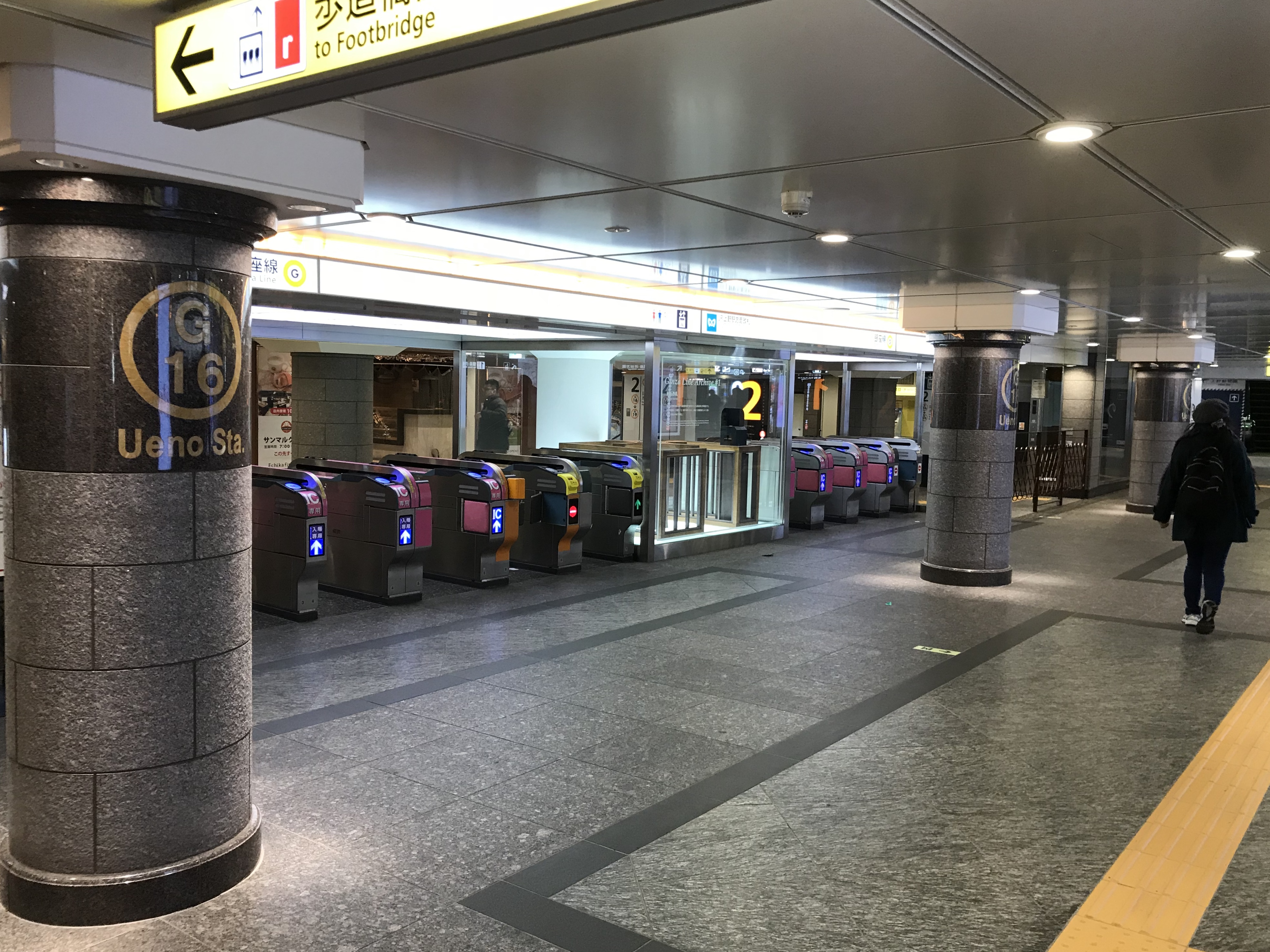
JR Ueno Station District Gate in January 2018

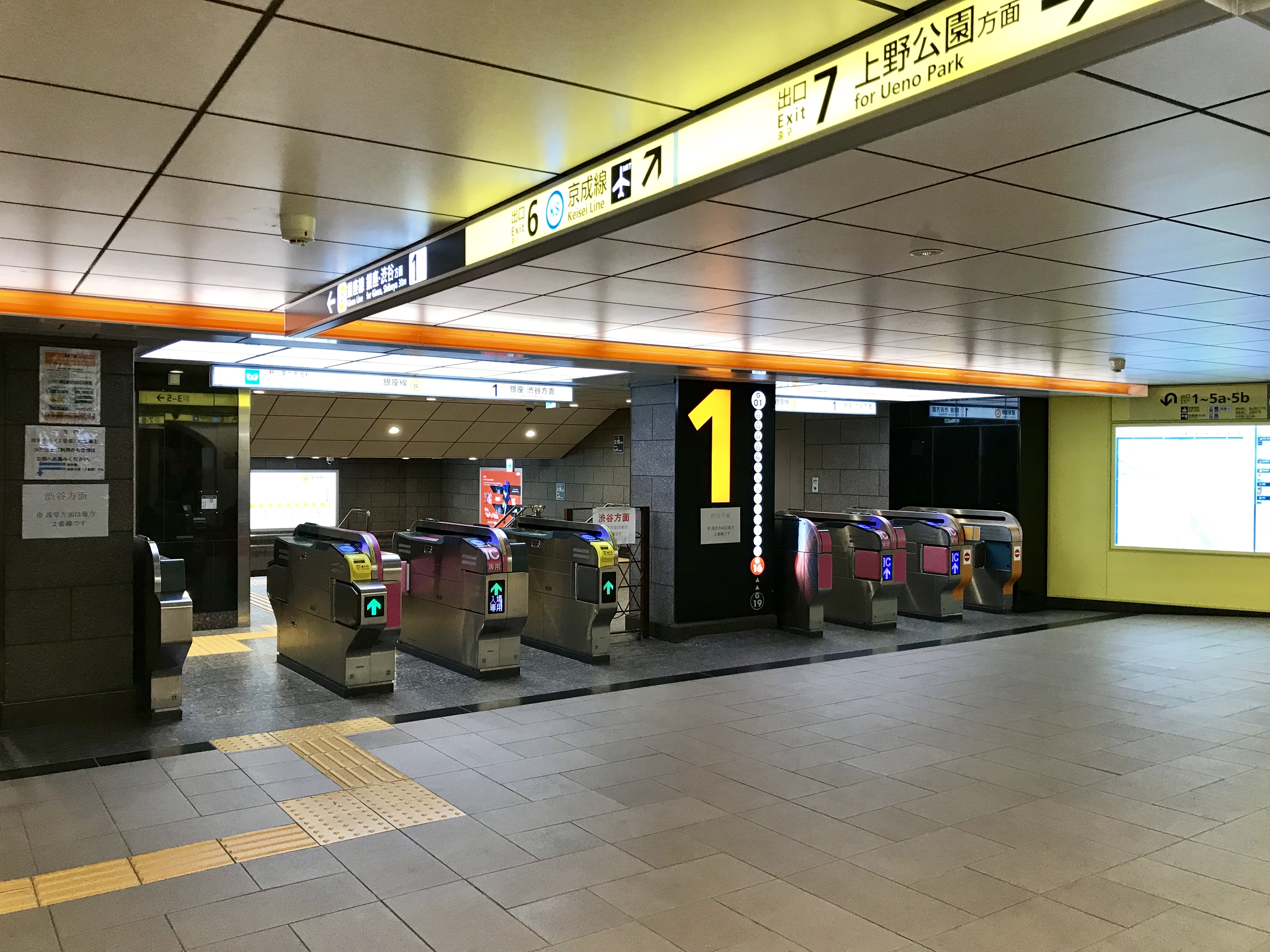
Ueno Park District Gate in October 2018

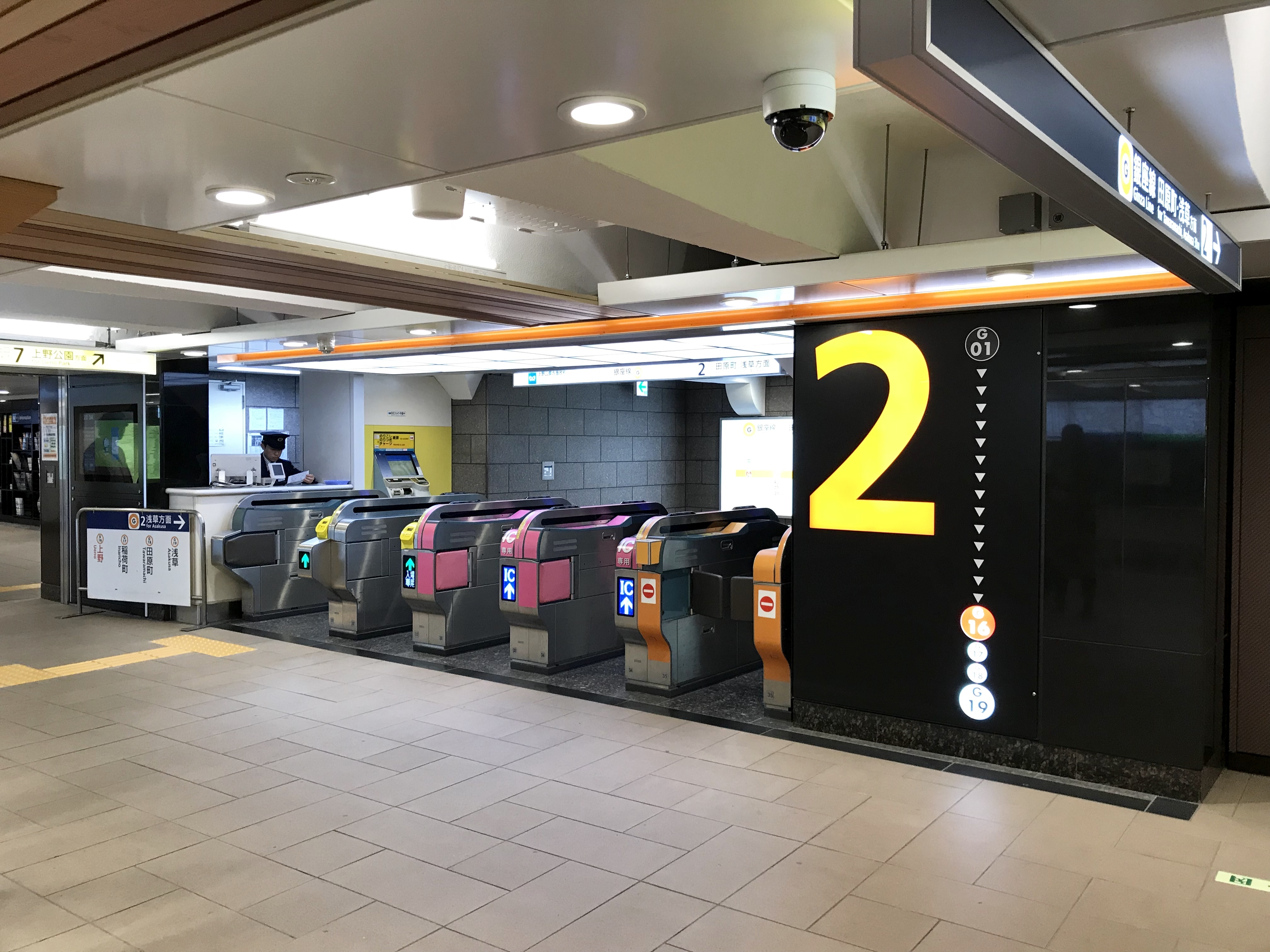
Ueno Park District Gate in October 2018

== History ==
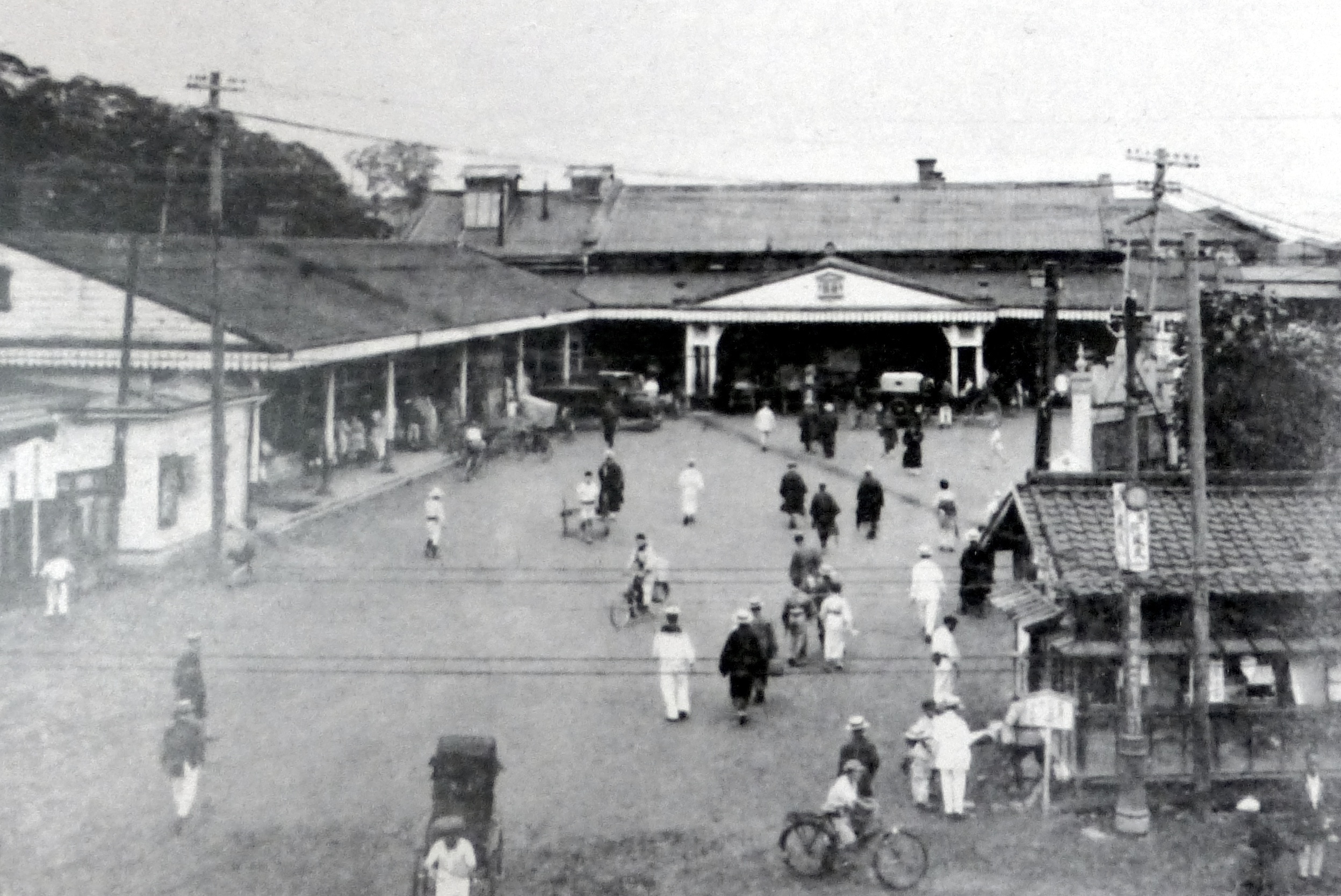
First station building, south entrance, 1912

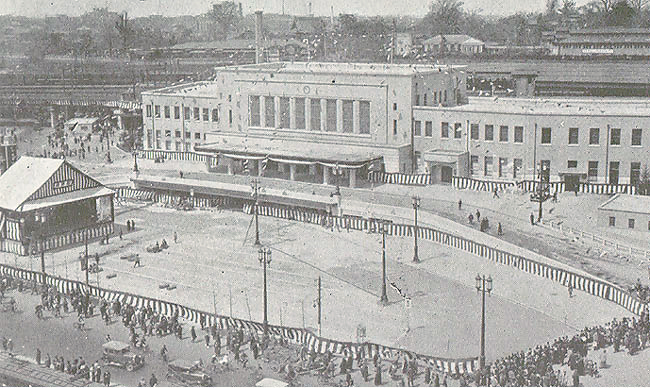
Opening of current station building in 1932

Ueno Station opened on 28 July 1883.

After the destruction of the first building in the fires caused by the 1923 Great Kantō earthquake, Japanese Government Railways constructed the current station building. While digging the foundations of the new building, bones, swords, and lances dating from the Battle of Ueno were excavated.

In 1927, Tokyo Underground Railway (now Tokyo Metro) opened Japan's first subway line from here to Asakusa Station.

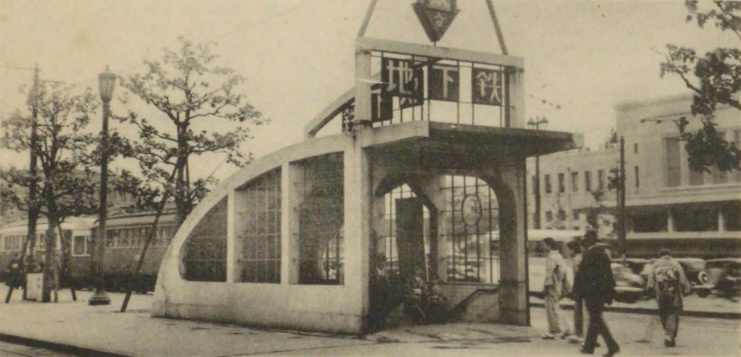
Ueno Station Exit, Tokyo Underground Railway, 1930s

During World War II and the following years, many war orphans found refuge in the station and its underground tunnels. Following World War II, the neighbourhood in front of Ueno Station was a major center of black market activity. Today, many people come to the area to visit Ameya-Yokochō.

In March 1985, the Tōhoku Shinkansen was extended south from Ōmiya to Ueno, with the line extended further south to Tokyo in June 1991.

The station facilities of the Ginza and Hibiya Lines were inherited by Tokyo Metro after the privatization of the Teito Rapid Transit Authority (TRTA) in 2004.

In March 2010, to promote the release of the Cho-Den-O Trilogy of the Kamen Rider movies, a special marking was used on the trains going to Nakano-fujimichō from Ueno, and Den-O's Rina Akiyama greeted 200 fans who rode on the first of those trains.

Station numbering was introduced to the non-Shinkansen JR East platforms in 2016 with Ueno being assigned station numbers JU02 for the Utsunomiya line, JJ01 for the Jōban Line rapid service, JK31 for the Keihin–Tōhoku Line, and JY05 for the Yamanote line. At the same time, JR East assigned the station a three-letter code to its major transfer stations; Ueno was assigned the code "UEN".

TH Liner services on the Hibiya Line between Ebisu and Kuki commenced on 6 June 2020.

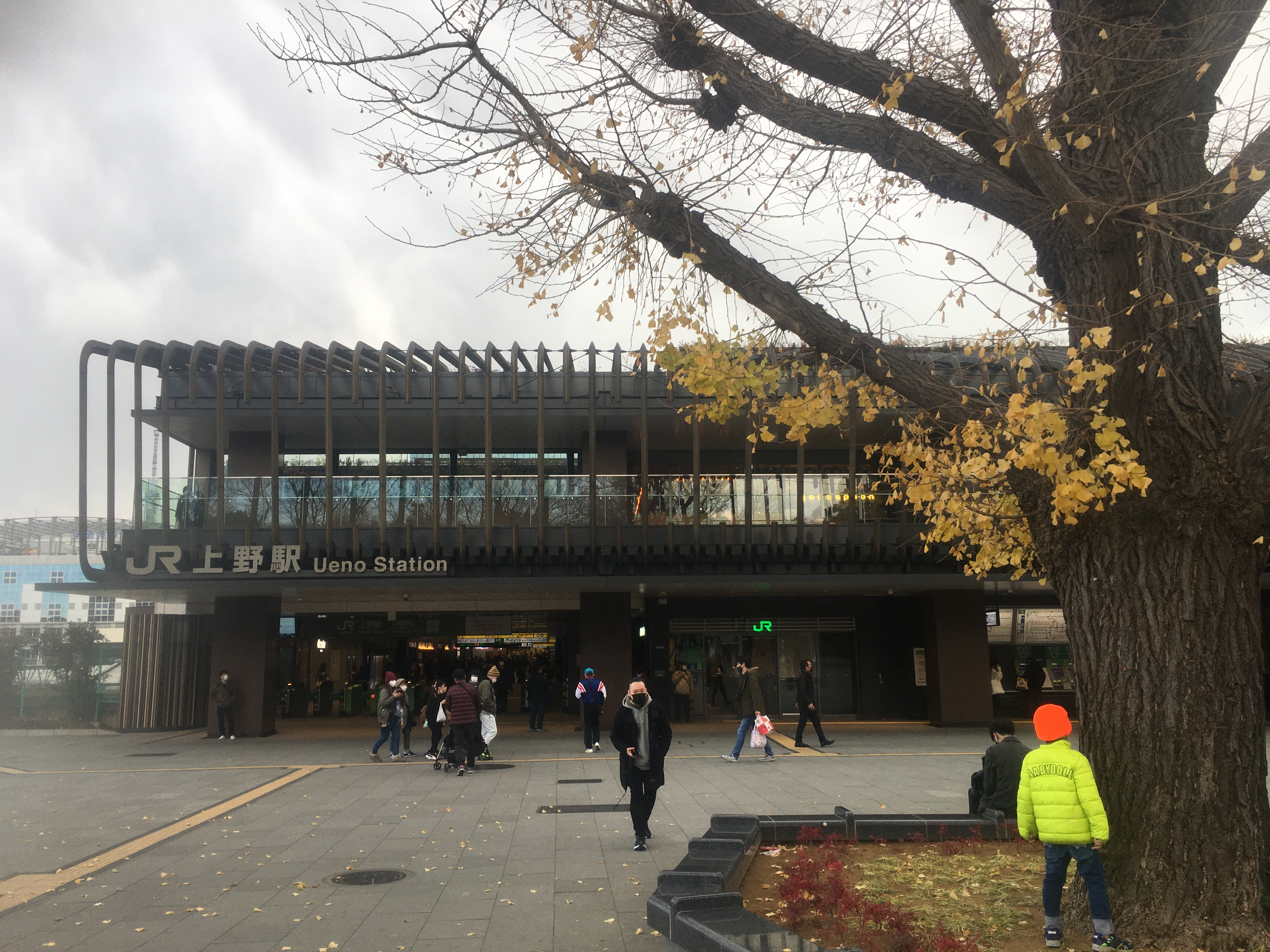
The new park exit, 2021

In March 2020, the Park Exit (Ueno Park Exit) was moved to the north and the roadway in front of it was changed to a dead end, allowing pedestrians to enter Ueno Park from the station without crossing the roadway.

== Passenger statistics ==
In fiscal 2013, the JR East station was used by 181,880 passengers daily (boarding passengers only), making it the thirteenth-busiest station operated by JR East. In fiscal 2013, the Tokyo Metro station was used by an average of 211,539 passengers per day (exiting and entering passengers), making it the eighth-busiest station operated by Tokyo Metro.

The daily passenger figures for each operator in previous years are as shown below.

Fiscal year	JR East	Tokyo Metro
1999	195,654	
2000	189,388	
2005	179,978	
2010	172,306	
2011	174,832	201,602
2012	183,611	212,509
2013	181,880	211,539

- Note that JR East figures are for boarding passengers only.

== Bus services ==
=== Highway buses ===
- Sky / Panda; For Hirosaki, Aomori Station
- Yuhi; For Tsuruoka Station, Amarume Station, and Sakata Station
- Tono Kamaishi; For Shin-Hanamaki Station, Tōno Station, Kamaishi Station, and Yamada
- Tokyo Sunrise; For Yamagata Station, Sagae Station, Sakurambo-Higashine Station, and Shinjō Station
- Rainbow; Yonezawa Station, Kaminoyama-Onsen Station, and Yamagata Station
- For Chino, Matsumoto Bus Terminal, and Nagano Station
- Dream Kanazawa; For Toyama Station, Kanazawa Station, and Kanazawa Institute of Technology
- Kimasshi; For Kanazawa Station
- Yamato; For Tenri Station, Nara Station, Kintetsu-Kōriyama Station, Hōryū-ji, Ōji Station, and Goidō Station
- For Ōtsu Station, Yamashina Station, Sanjō Station, and Kyōto Station
- Flying Liner; For Kyōto Station, Ōsaka Station, Ōsaka Namba Station, Ōsaka Abenobashi Station, and Fujiidera Station
- Mamakari Liner; For Okayama Station, Kurashiki Station

== See also ==
- List of railway stations in Japan
- Transport in Greater Tokyo

== In Literature ==
- Tokyo Ueno Station, by Yu Miri, English tr. by Morgan Giles (Tilted Axis, 2019. ISBN 978-1911284161 // Penguin Randomhouse, 2020. ISBN 978-0593088029)
