= Naka-okachimachi Station =

Metro station in Tokyo, Japan

Coordinates: 35.7064°N 139.7760°E

Naka-okachimachi Station 仲御徒町駅

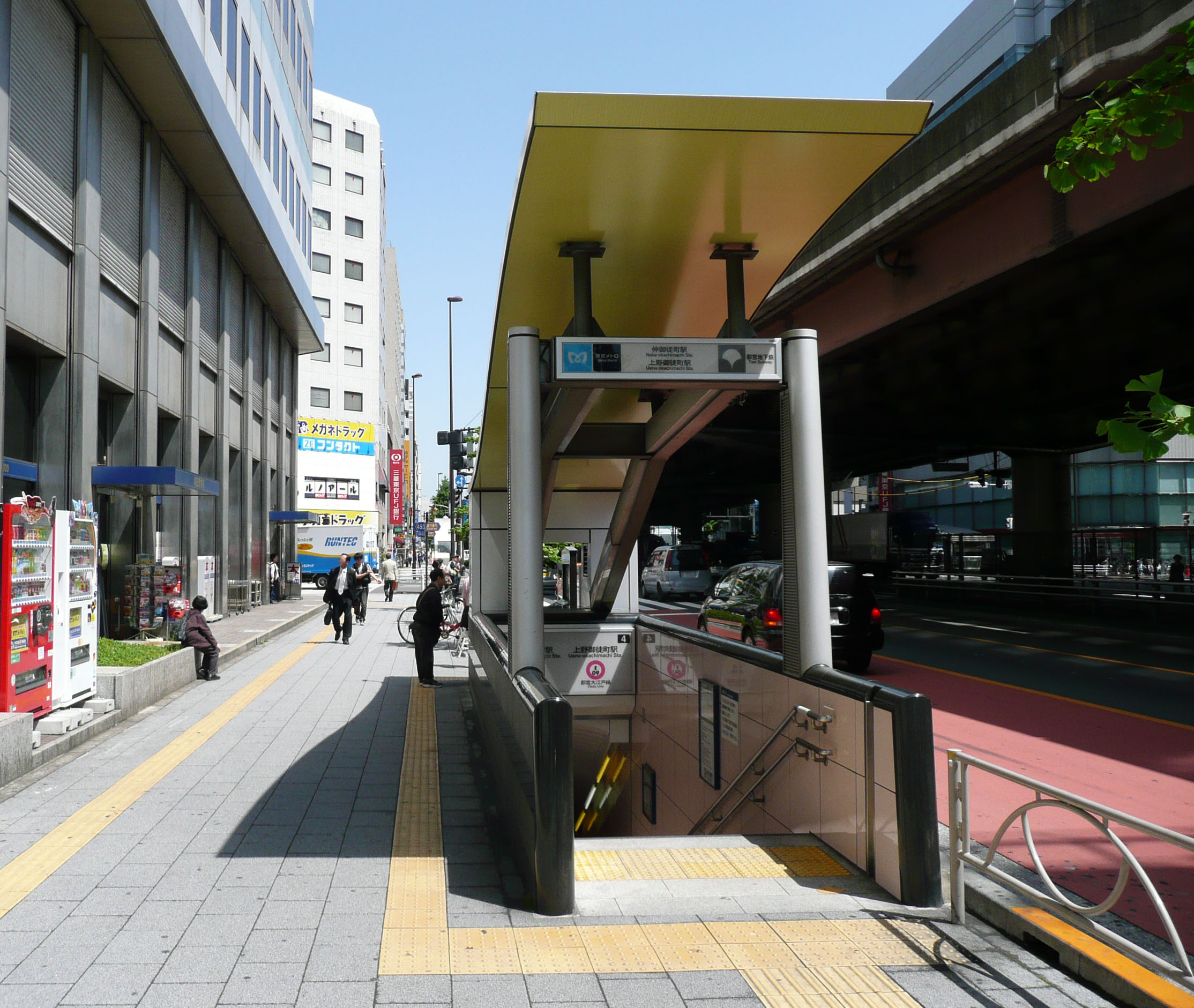
- Entrance No. 4 in May 2010

General information
- Location: 5-24-12 Ueno District, Taitō City, Tokyo; Japan
- Operator: Tokyo Metro
- Line: Hibiya Line
- Distance: 5.8 km (3.6 mi) from Kita-senju
- Platforms: 1 island platform
- Tracks: 2
- Connections: Ueno-okachimachi

Construction
- Structure type: Underground

Other information
- Station code: H-17
- Website: Official website

History
- Opened: 28 March 1961; 65 years ago

Passengers
- FY2011: 42,317 daily

Services
| Preceding station | Tokyo Metro | Following station |
|---|---|---|
| Akihabara towards Naka-meguro | Hibiya Line | Ueno towards Kita-Senju |
Location
- Location within Tokyo Yamanote Loop Location within Tokyo wards area Location within Japan

Naka-okachimachi Station (仲御徒町駅, Naka-okachimachi-eki) is a subway station on the Hibiya Line in Taitō, Tokyo, Japan, operated by the Tokyo subway operator Tokyo Metro.

== Lines ==
Naka-okachimachi Station is served by the Hibiya Line, and lies 5.8 km from the starting point of the line at Kita-Senju.

The station is also situated relatively close to Ueno, Ueno-okachimachi, Okachimachi, and Keisei Ueno stations.

== Station layout ==
The station has one island platform serving two tracks on the second basement ("B2F") level. Track 1 serves Naka-Meguro-bound trains, while Track 2 serves Kita-Senju-bound trains.

=== Platforms ===
| 1 | Hibiya Line | for Ginza, Roppongi, and Naka-meguro |
| 2 | Hibiya Line | for Ueno and Kita-senju; Tobu Skytree Line for Tōbu-Dōbutsu-Kōen; Tobu Nikko Line for Minami-Kurihashi |

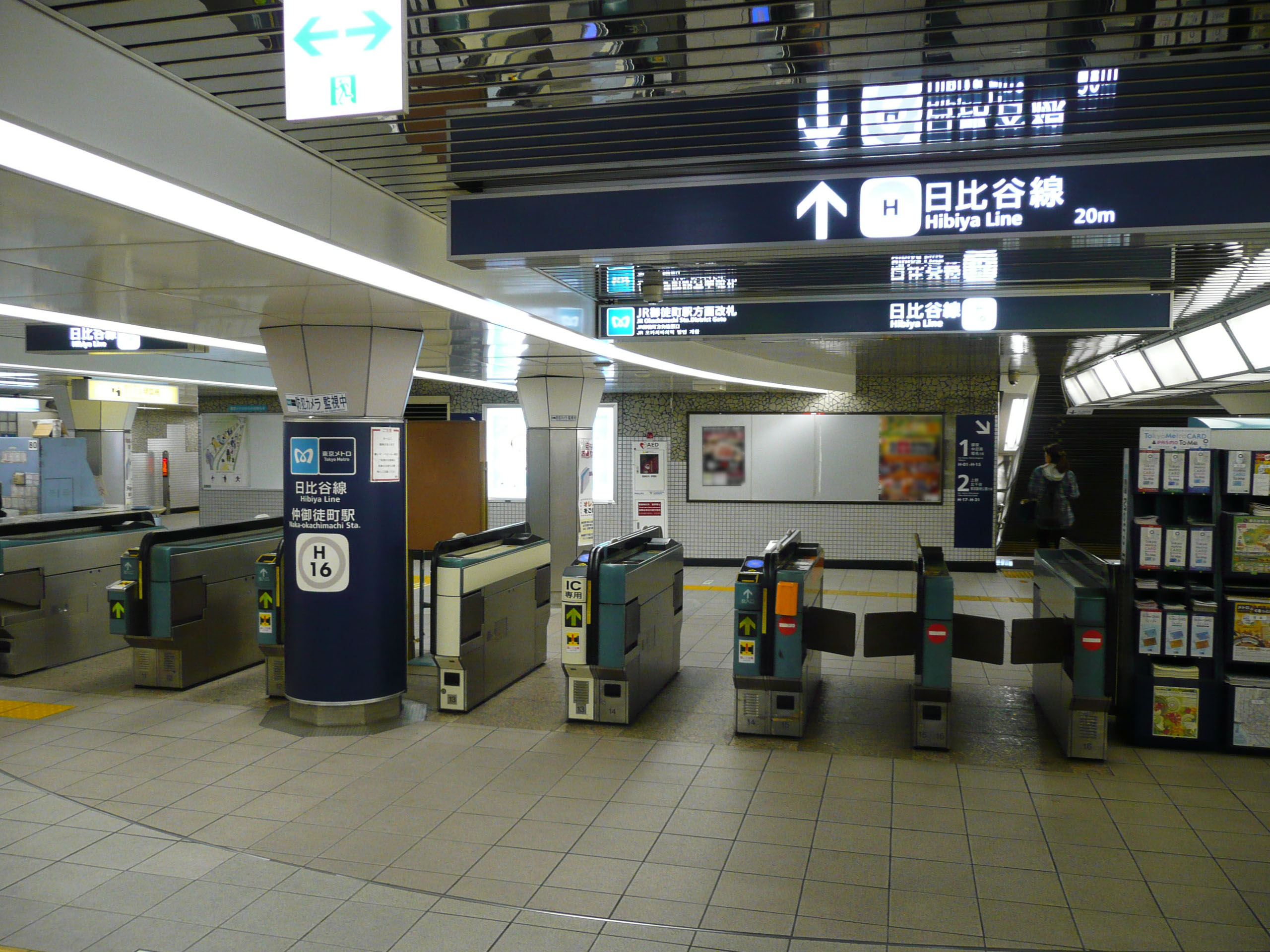
The ticket barriers in May 2010

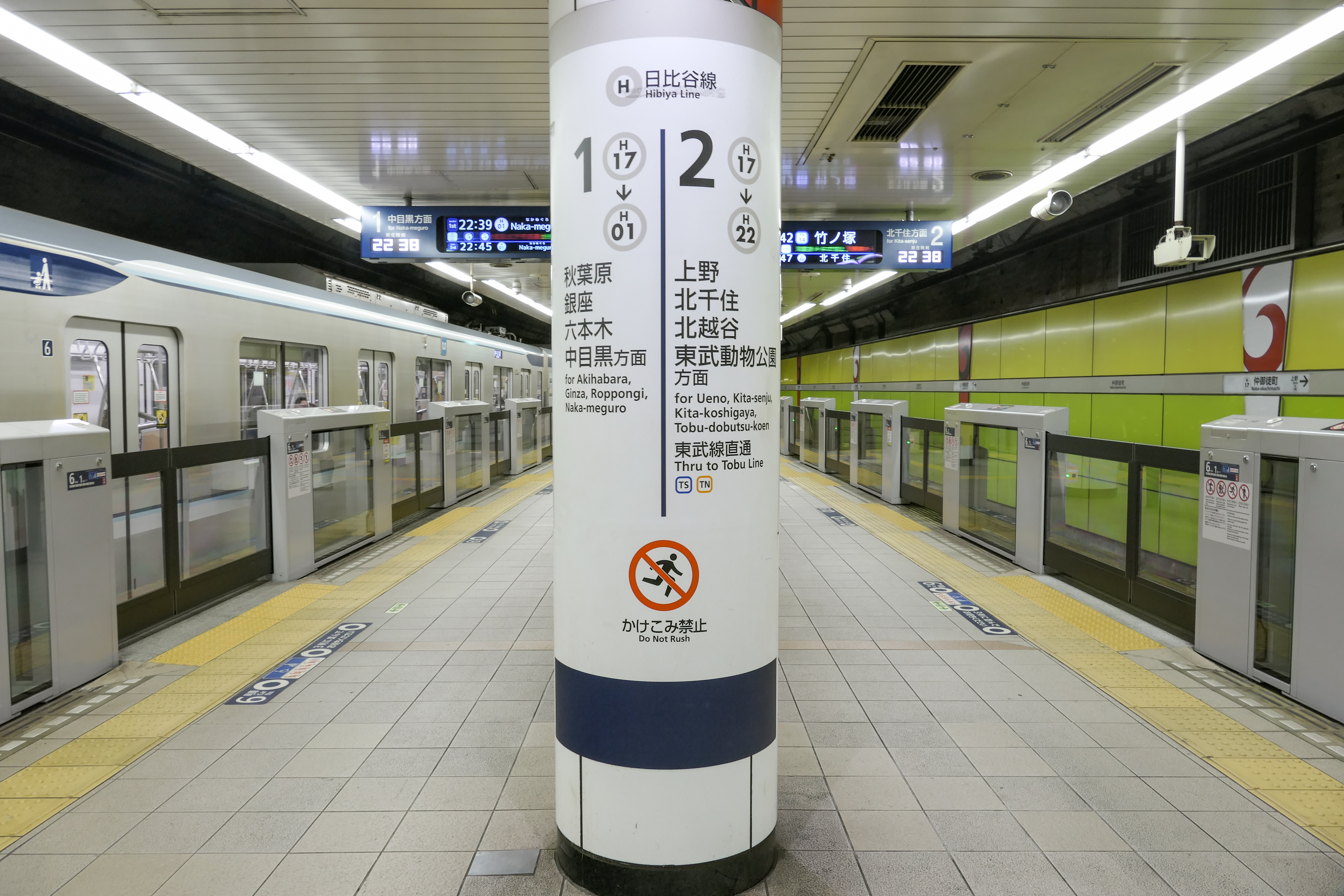
The platforms in November 2023

== History ==
The station opened on 28 March 1961.

The station facilities were inherited by Tokyo Metro after the privatization of the Teito Rapid Transit Authority (TRTA) in 2004.

== Passenger statistics ==
In fiscal 2011, the station was used by an average of 42,317 passengers daily.

== Surrounding area ==
The following stations are situated nearby:

- Ueno Station (Ginza Line/Hibiya Line)
- Ueno-okachimachi Station (Ōedo Line)
- Okachimachi station (Keihin-Tohoku Line/Yamanote Line)

On March 16, 2009, Naka-okachimachi Station was connected to Keisei Ueno Station, and a transfer passage was opened.

== See also ==
- List of railway stations in Japan
