= Omote-sandō Station =

Metro station in Tokyo, Japan

Coordinates: 35°39′54.5328″N 139°42′45.0756″E

Omote-sando Station 表参道駅

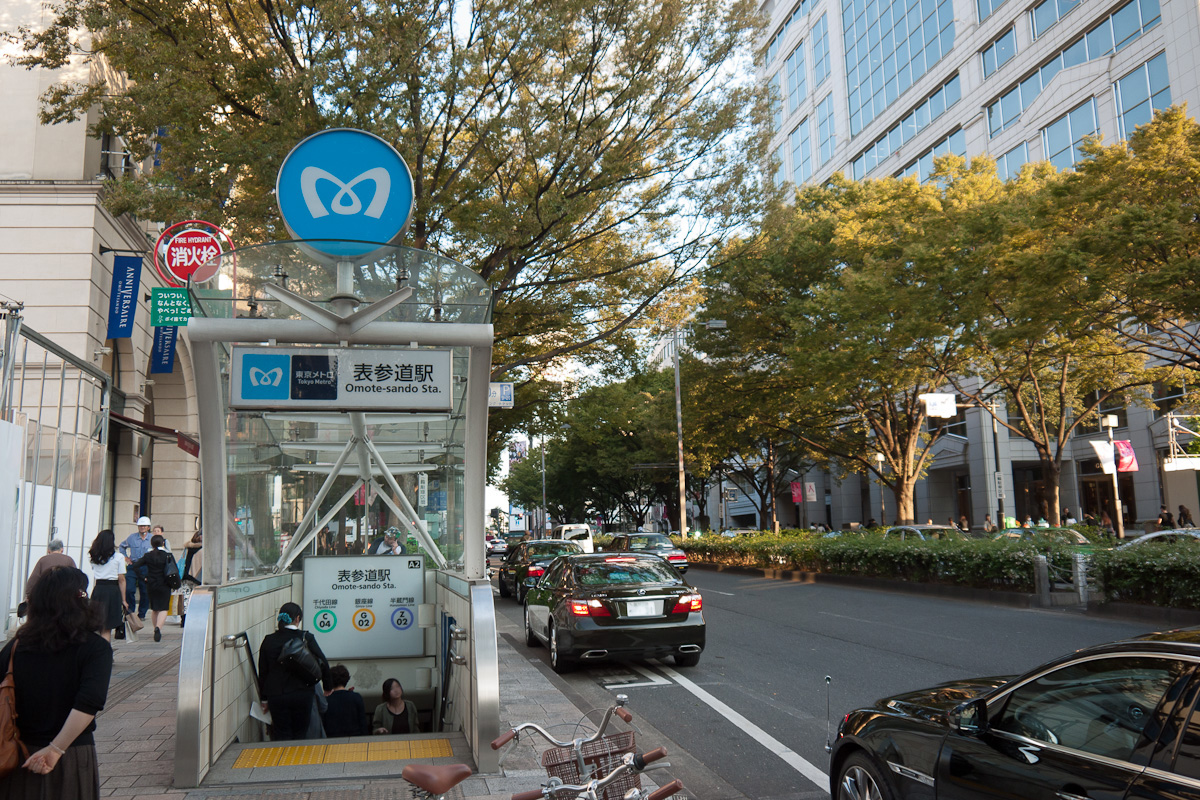
- Omote-sando Station entrance

Japanese name
- Shinjitai: 表参道駅
- Kyūjitai: 表參道驛
- Hiragana: おもてさんどうえき
- Literal meaning: Chart Join Way Station

General information
- Location: 3-6-12 Kita-aoyama, Minato City, Tokyo; Japan
- System: Tokyo subway
- Owner: Tokyo Metro Co., Ltd.
- Operator: Tokyo Metro
- Lines: Chiyoda Line; Ginza Line; Hanzōmon Line
- Platforms: 3 island platforms
- Tracks: 6

Construction
- Structure type: Underground

Other information
- Station code: C-04, G-02, Z-02

History
- Opened: 20 December 1938; 87 years ago
- Former names: Aoyama-rokuchōme (until 1978)

Passengers
- FY2007: 151,667 daily

Services
Preceding station	Tokyo Metro	Following station
Seijogakuen-Mae towards Hakone-Yumoto, Gotemba or Katase-Enoshima	Romancecar	Kasumigaseki towards Kita-Senju
Meiji-jingumae towards Yoyogi-Uehara	Chiyoda Line	Nogizaka towards Kita-Ayase
Shibuya Terminus	Ginza Line	Gaiemmae towards Asakusa
Shibuya Terminus	Hanzōmon Line	Aoyama-itchome towards Oshiage
Location
- Location within Tokyo Yamanote Loop Location within Tokyo wards area Location within Japan

Omote-sando Station (表参道駅, Omote-sandō-eki) is a Tokyo Metro subway station located at the intersection of Omotesandō (Avenue Omotesandō) and Aoyama-dori (Aoyama Street) in Aoyama, Minato ward, Tokyo, Japan. Part of the Chiyoda Line platforms extends into Shibuya ward.

== Lines ==
Omote-sando Station is served by the following three lines.

- Tokyo Metro Chiyoda Line (C-04)
- Tokyo Metro Ginza Line (G-02)
- Tokyo Metro Hanzomon Line (Z-02)

== Station layout ==
There are three levels at this station:

- B1: Ginza and Hanzomon Line platforms
- B2: Ticket hall / ticket gates / main concourse
- B3: Chiyoda Line platforms

All platforms are wheelchair accessible. There is same-direction cross-platform interchange between the Ginza and Hanzomon lines, making this a convenient transfer point on the Aoyama-dōri section of these lines. Passengers who wish to change to the JR lines or the Keio Inokashira Line at Shibuya often change to the Ginza line here; those who want the Tokyu Toyoko Line, the Tokyo Metro Fukutoshin Line or the Tokyu Den-en-toshi Line often change to the Hanzomon Line. While both the west-bound Ginza and Hanzomon Line goes to Shibuya station, they have separate fare control area at Shibuya, making transfers inconvenient.

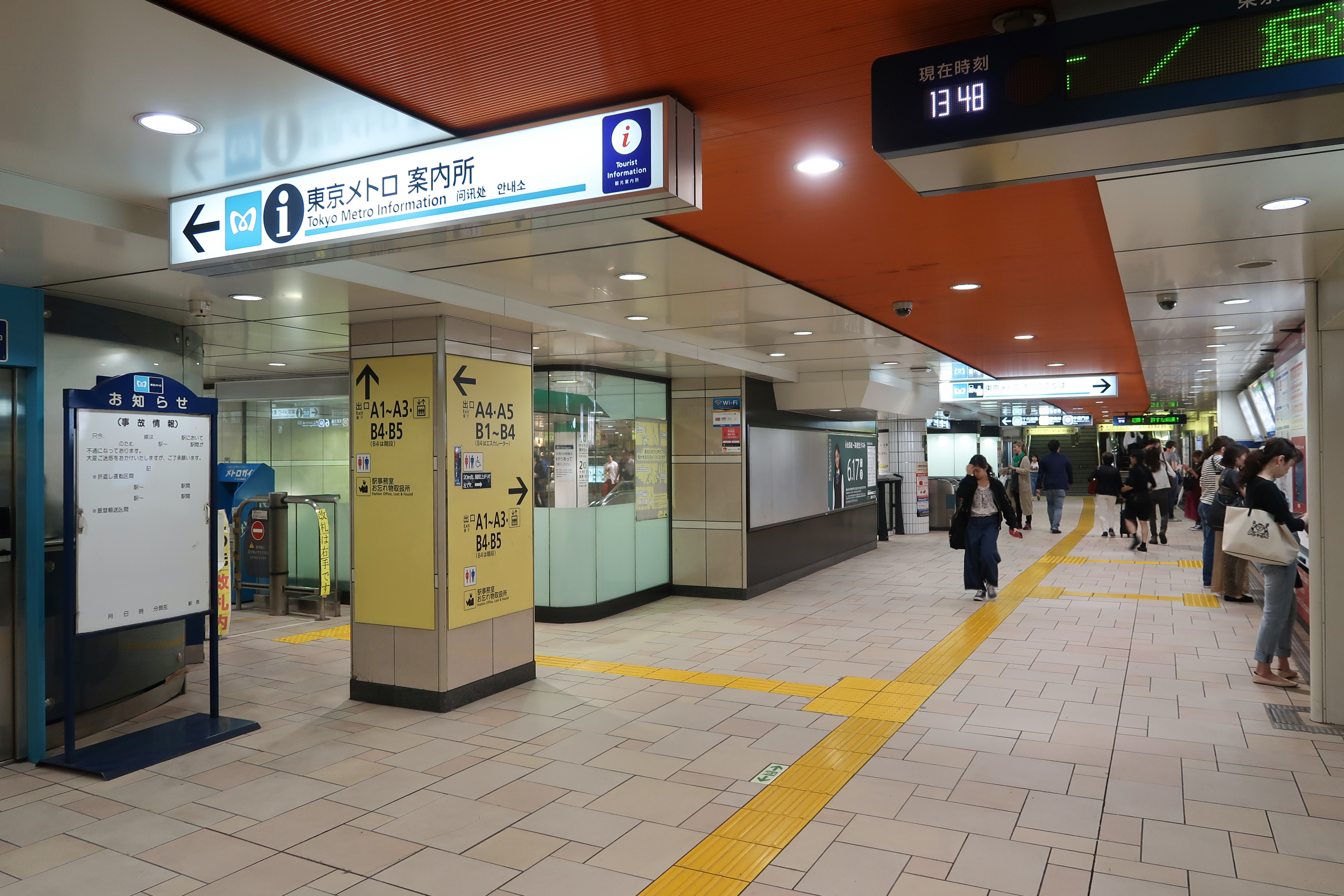
Chiyoda Line Concourse, 2018

== Platforms ==
The Chiyoda Line station has one island platform and two tracks. The Ginza/Hanzomon Lines station has two island platforms and four tracks. There are same-direction cross-platform interchanges in the Ginza/Hanzomon Lines station.

1	Chiyoda Line	for Meiji-jingumae and Yoyogi-uehara; Odakyu Odawara Line for Hon-Atsugi and Isehara
2	Chiyoda Line	for Otemachi, Kita-senju, Ayase, and Kita-ayase; Joban Line (Local) for Matsudo, Kashiwa and Toride (via Ayase)
3	Hanzōmon Line	for Shibuya; Den-en-toshi Line for Chūō-Rinkan
4	Ginza Line	for Shibuya
5	Ginza Line	for Akasaka-mitsuke, Ginza, Ueno, and Asakusa
6	Hanzomon Line	for Otemachi and Oshiage; Tobu Skytree Line for Tōbu-Dōbutsu-Kōen; Tobu Isesaki Line for Kuki; Tōbu Nikkō Line for Minami-Kurihashi

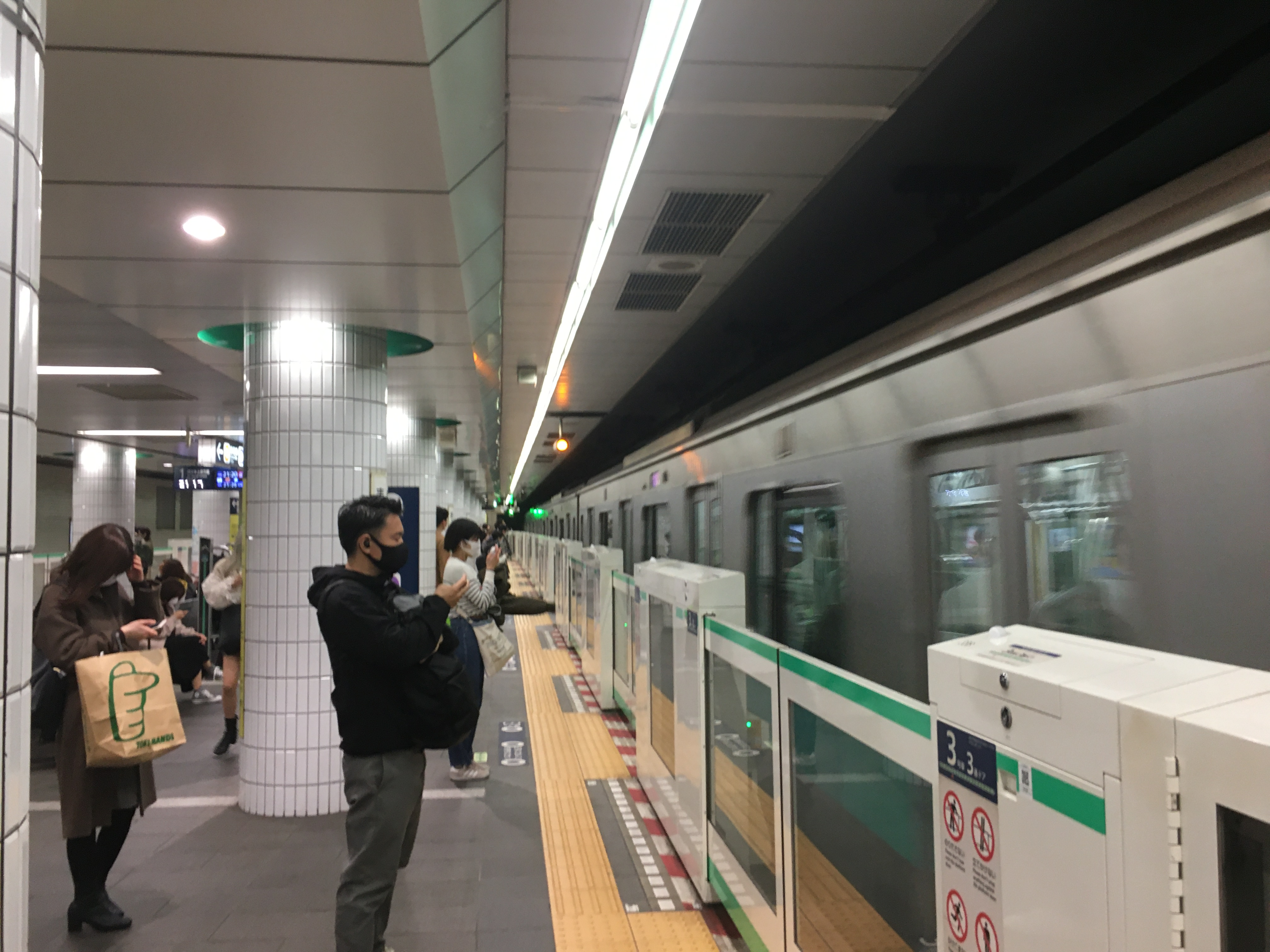
Chiyoda Line Platform, 2021

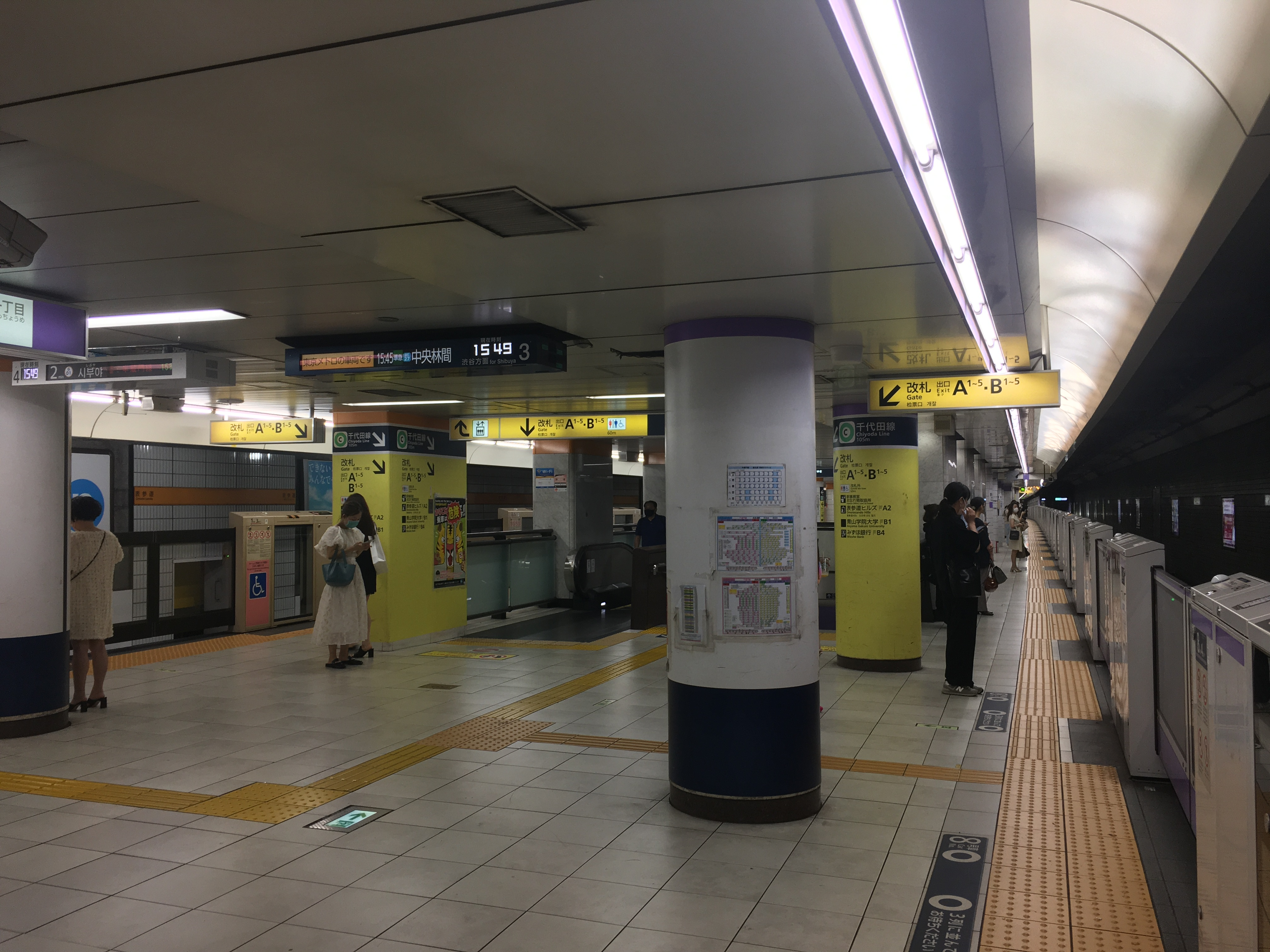
Cross-platform interchange between Ginza Line and Hanzomon Line, 2022

== History ==
The station was opened as the terminus of the Tokyo Rapid Railway from Toranomon as Aoyama-rokuchōme Station (青山六丁目駅) on November 18, 1938, at a site approx. 180 m southwest of its current location (between the current station and Shibuya Station). It became a through station later that year when the section to Shibuya opened on December 20. When through services from the Tokyo Underground Railway (from Asakusa) began on September 16, 1939, the station became Jingūmae Station (神宮前駅). This makes it the only Tokyo Metro station to have been renamed twice.

The Chiyoda Line platforms at Omotesando Station was opened on October 20, 1972 by the Teito Rapid Transit Authority (TRTA); the Omotesando name was used to avoid confusion with Meiji-Jingūmae Station, the next stop on the Chiyoda Line toward Yoyogi-Uehara. From 1972 to 1977, Omotesando and Jingumae were separate stations for the Chiyoda and Ginza lines respectively. In 1977, the Ginza Line moved to a temporary station on the northeast side of Omotesando Station, pending completion of the Hanzomon Line platforms. The new platforms for the Hanzomon Line and Ginza Line opened on August 1, 1978. The space used for the old Jingumae Station remains visible from the Ginza Line tunnel as of 2015.

Scenes of the 2003 film Lost in Translation were filmed there at the Hanzōmon and Ginza lines platform.

The station facilities were inherited by Tokyo Metro after the privatization of the TRTA in 2004.

PASMO smart card coverage at this station began operation on 18 March 2007.

== Surrounding area ==
- Omotesandō, Aoyama and Harajuku area
- Aoyama Gakuin
- Headquarters of the United Nations University
- Nezu Museum
- Chōkoku-ji (長谷寺), also known as Azabu Ō-Kannon (麻布大観音) (Sōtō-shū temple) - located in Nishi-Azabu
