= Nogizaka Station =

Metro station in Tokyo, Japan

Coordinates: 35.666536°N 139.726186°E

Nogizaka Station 乃木坂駅

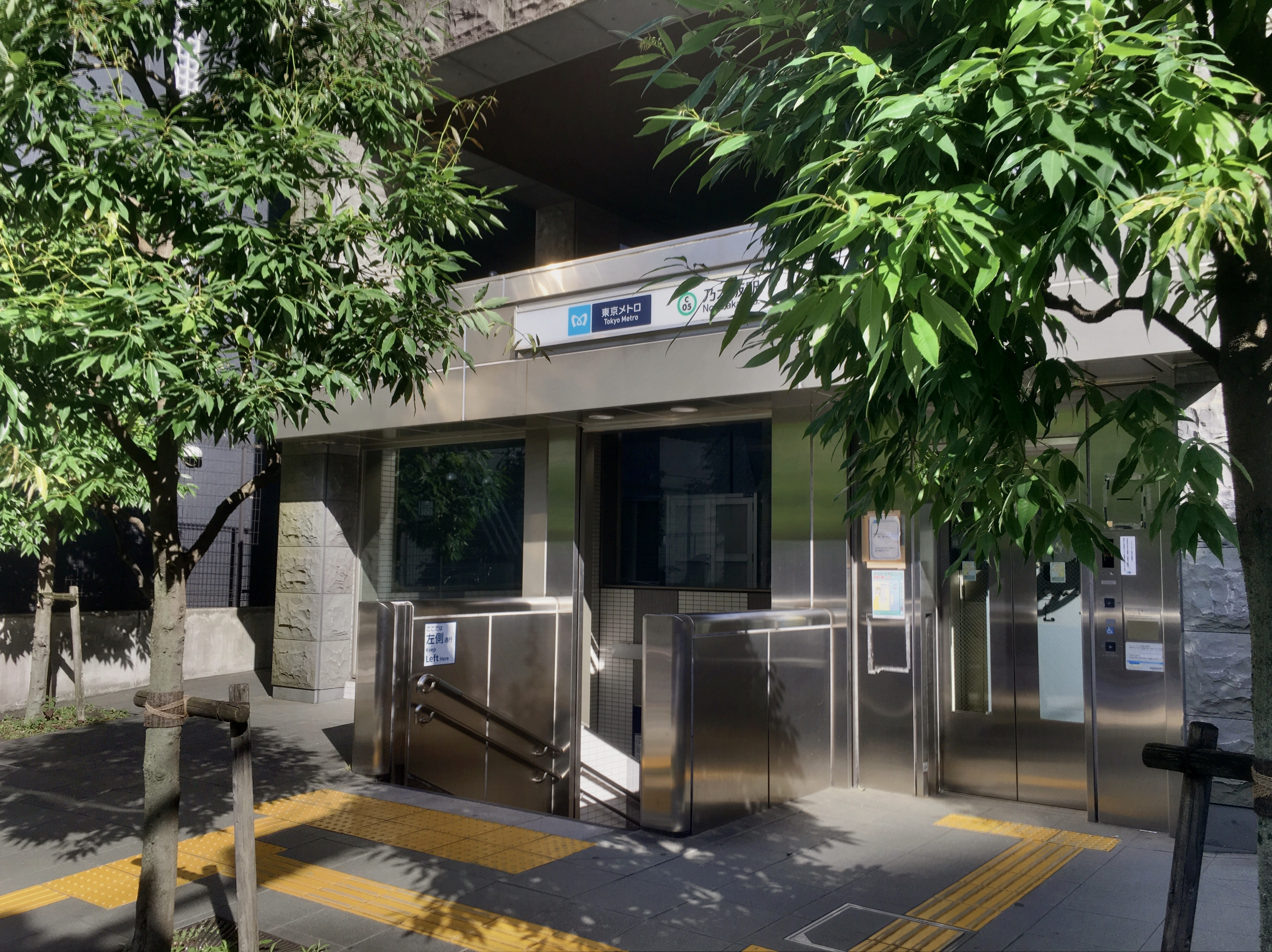
- The station entrance in June 2022

Japanese name
- Shinjitai: 乃木坂駅
- Kyūjitai: 乃木阪驛
- Hiragana: のぎざかえき

General information
- Location: 1-25-8 Minami-Aoyama District, Minato City; Japan
- Operator: Tokyo Metro
- Line: Chiyoda Line
- Distance: 17.4 km (10.8 mi) from Ayase
- Platforms: 1 island platform
- Tracks: 2

Construction
- Structure type: Underground

Other information
- Station code: C-05

History
- Opened: 20 October 1972; 53 years ago

Services
Preceding station	Tokyo Metro	Following station
Omote-sando towards Yoyogi-Uehara	Chiyoda Line	Akasaka towards Kita-Ayase
Location
- Location within Tokyo Yamanote Loop Location within Tokyo wards area Location within Japan

Nogizaka Station (乃木坂駅, Nogizaka-eki) is a subway station on the Tokyo Metro Chiyoda Line in Minato, Tokyo, Japan, operated by the Tokyo subway operator Tokyo Metro.

== Lines ==
Nogizaka Station is served by the Tokyo Metro Chiyoda Line, and is 17.4 km from the northern starting point of the line at Ayase and 4.5 km from the southern starting point of the line at Yoyogi-Uehara.

== Station layout ==
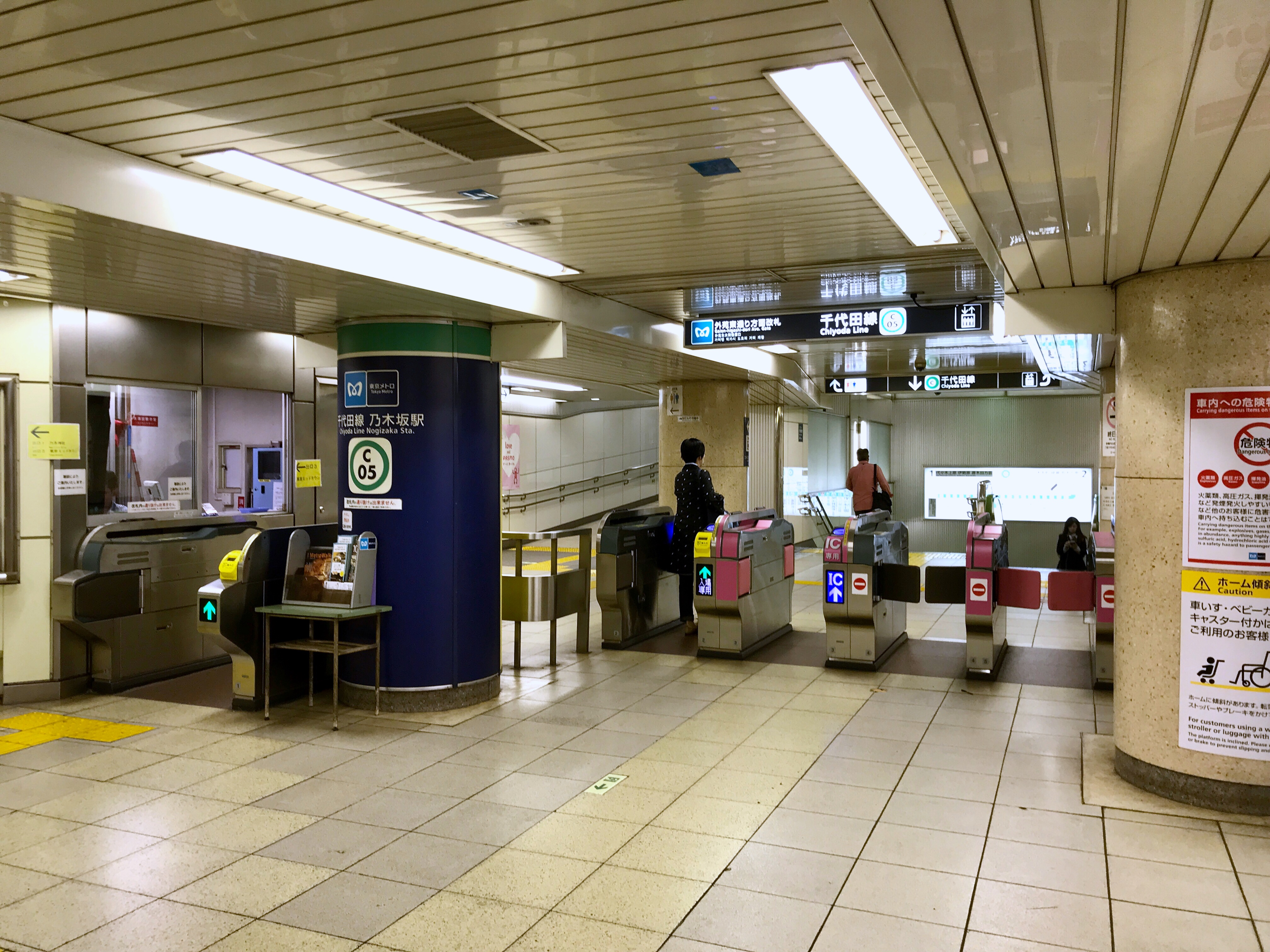
Ticket barriers in October 2018

The station has one island platform serving two tracks.

=== Platforms ===
1	Chiyoda Line	for Omote-sando and Yoyogi-uehara; Odakyu Odawara Line for Hon-Atsugi and Isehara
2	Chiyoda Line	for Otemachi, Kita-senju, Ayase, and Kita-ayase; Joban Line (Local) for Matsudo, Kashiwa and Toride (via Ayase)

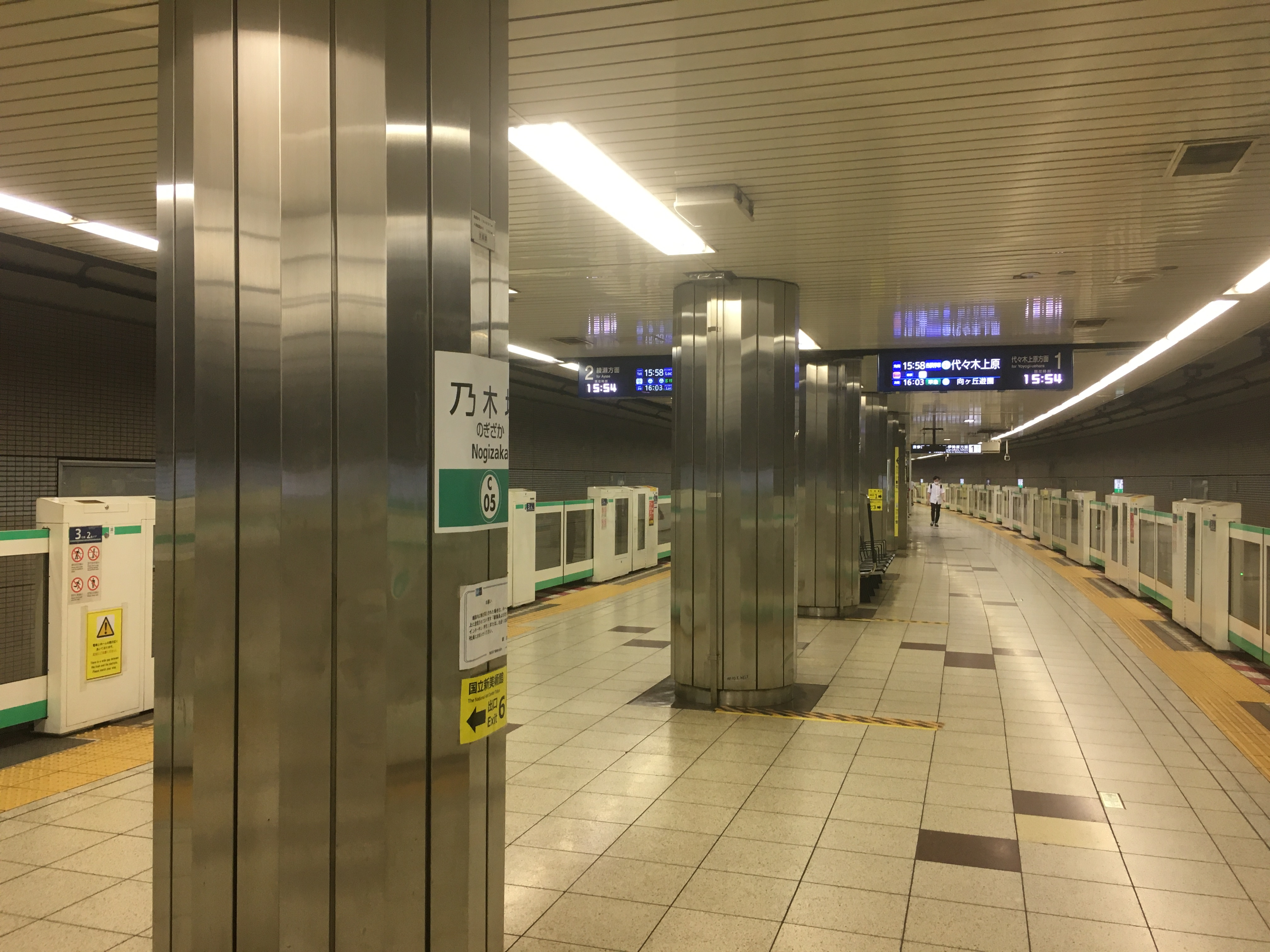
Station platforms in June 2022

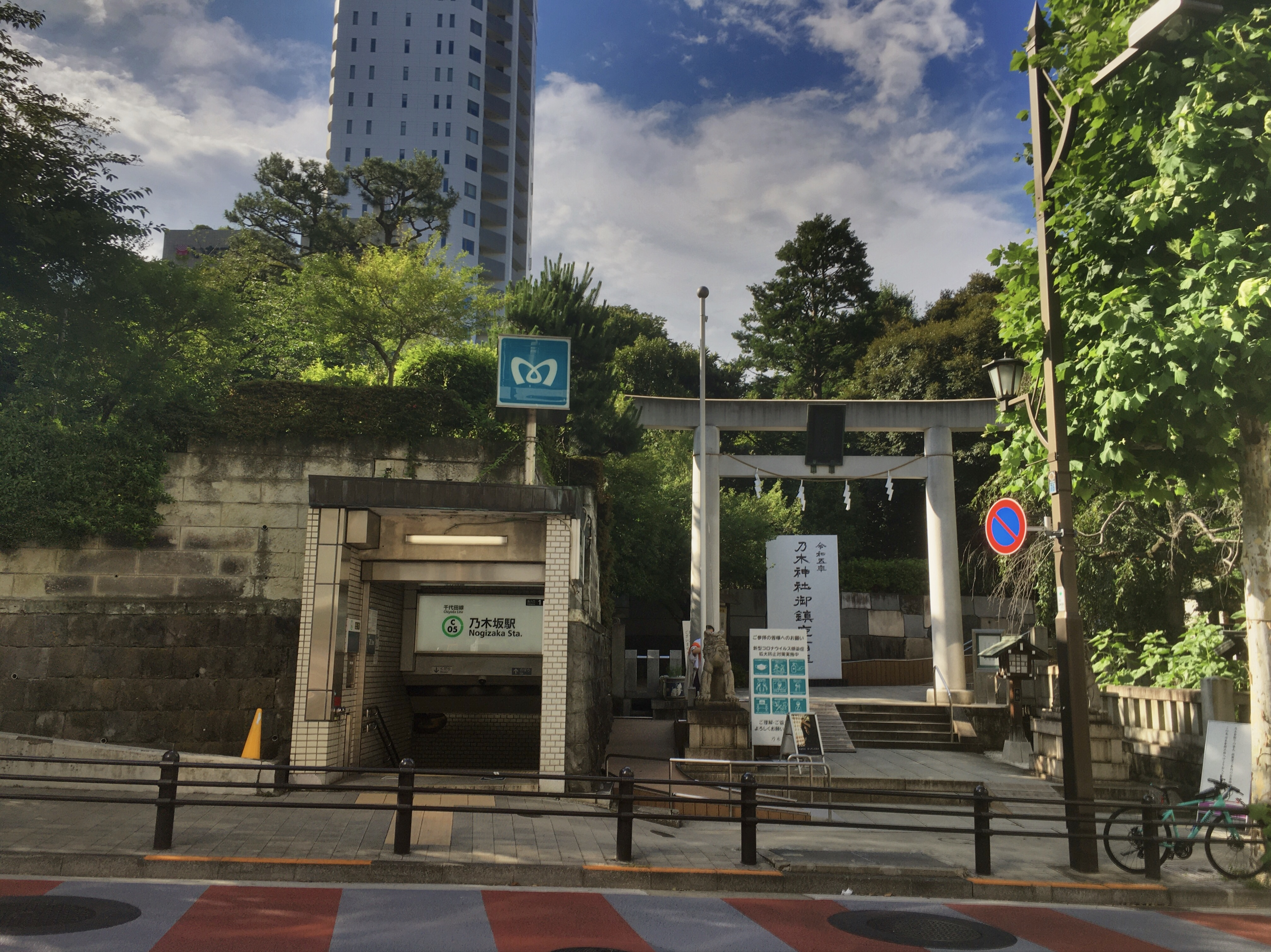
Exit 1

== History ==
Nogizaka Station was opened on 20 October 1972 by the Teito Rapid Transit Authority (TRTA).

The station facilities were inherited by Tokyo Metro after the privatization of the TRTA in 2004.

Since 2016, the station's departure melody is an instrumental rendition of the song "Kimi no Na wa Kibō" by the pop group Nogizaka46, performed by Nogizaka46 member Erika Ikuta on the piano.

== Surrounding area ==
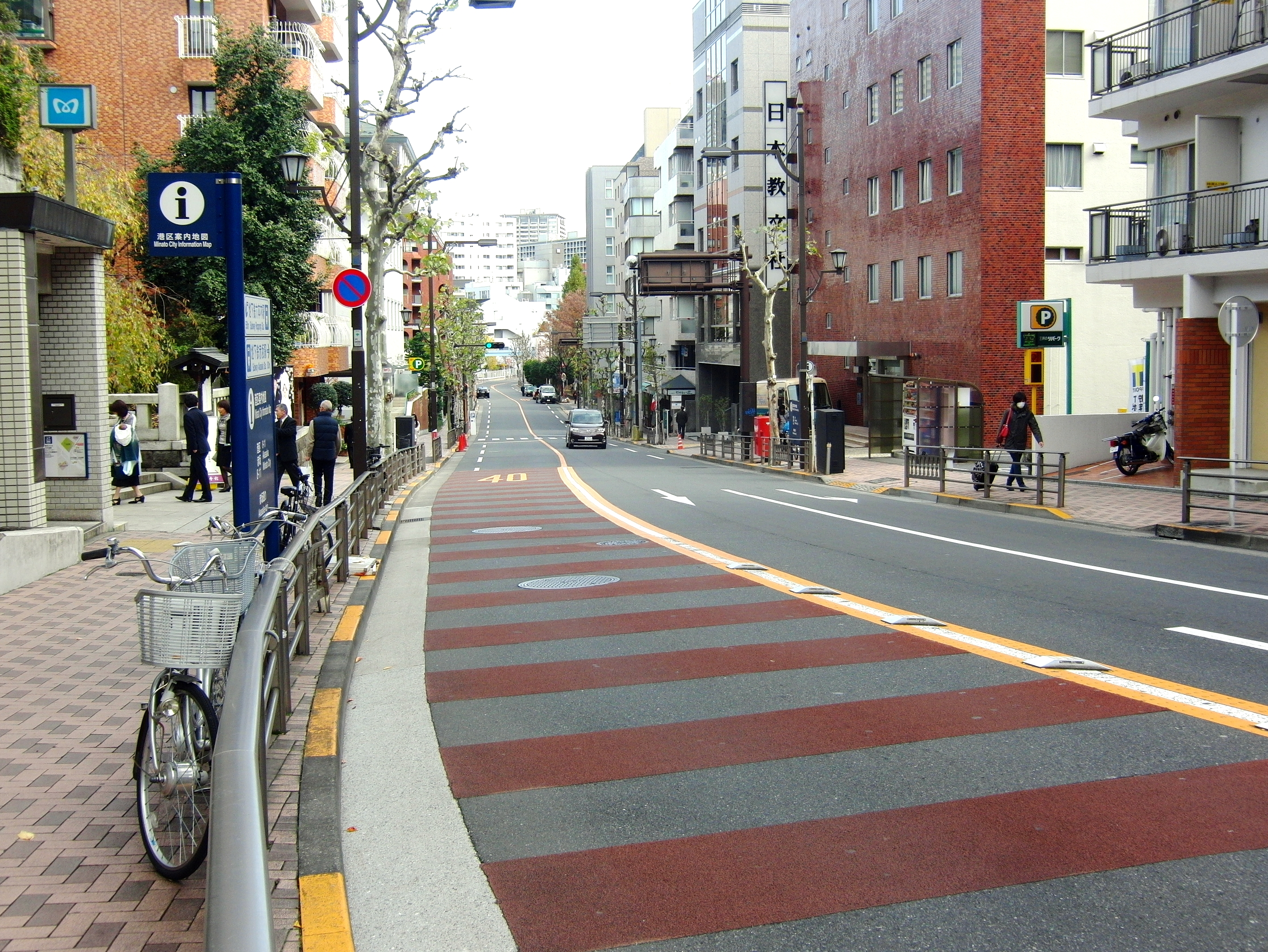
Nogizaka slope

- Aoyama Cemetery
- Nogi Shrine
- The National Art Center, Tokyo
- National Graduate Institute for Policy Studies
- Akasaka Press Center
  - Stars and Stripes
- Tokyo Midtown
- Roppongi Hills

== See also ==
- List of railway stations in Japan
