= 207 series (JR East) =

Japanese train type

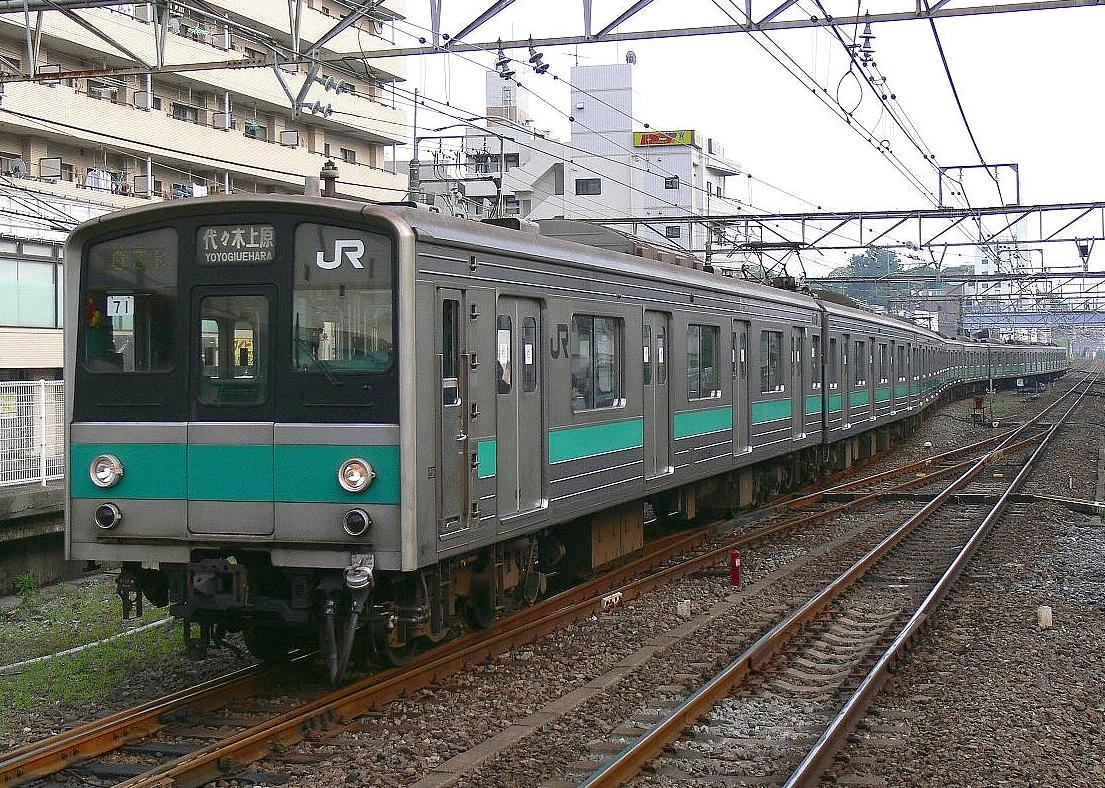
- The 207 series set at Matsudo Station in May 2006
- In service: November 1986 – December 2009
- Manufacturers: Kawasaki Heavy Industries, Tokyu Car Corporation
- Constructed: 1986
- Scrapped: January 2010
- Number built: 10 vehicles (1 set)
- Number in service: None
- Number preserved: None
- Number scrapped: 10 vehicles
- Successor: E233-2000 series
- Formation: 10 cars per trainset
- Fleet numbers: 71
- Operators: JNR (1986–1987); JR East (1987–2009)
- Depot: Matsudo
- Lines served: Joban Line, Tokyo Metro Chiyoda Line

Specifications
- Car body construction: Stainless steel
- Car length: 19,500 mm (64 ft 0 in)
- Width: 2,800 mm (9 ft 2 in)
- Height: 4,140 mm (13 ft 7 in)
- Doors: 4 pairs per side
- Maximum speed: 80 km/h (50 mph) (Chiyoda Line); 90 km/h (56 mph) (Jōban Line); 100 km/h (62 mph) (Design)
- Weight: 299.9 t
- Traction system: GTO-VVVF
- Traction motors: MT63
- Power output: 3,600 kW
- Acceleration: 3.3 km/(h⋅s) (2.1 mph/s)
- Deceleration: 5.0 km/(h⋅s) (3.1 mph/s) (emergency)
- Electric system: 1,500 V DC overhead catenary
- Current collection: PS21 lozenge-type pantograph
- Bogies: DT50E (motored); TR235F (trailer)
- Safety systems: ATS-SN, New CS-ATC
- Track gauge: 1,067 mm (3 ft 6 in)

The 207 series (207系) or 207–900 series (207系900番台) was a commuter electric multiple unit (EMU) train type introduced in 1986 by Japanese National Railways (JNR) and operated by East Japan Railway Company (JR East) on through services between the Joban Line and Tokyo Metro Chiyoda Line. Only one 10-car set was built, which was withdrawn in December 2009.

== Design ==
Based on the earlier 205 series design, the 207-900 series was a prototype built as the first VVVF-controlled EMU operated by JNR. The 207 series built later by JR West bears no relation to this train.

The train used adjustable voltage/adjustable frequency (AVAF) inverters and induction motors using gate turn-off thyristor (GTO) components.

== Formation ==
The sole 10-car set, numbered "71", was formed as follows, with car 1 at the Yoyogi-Uehara end and car 10 at the Toride end.

Car No.	1	2	3	4	5	6	7	8	9	10
Designation	T'c	M2	M1	T2	M2	M1	T1	M2	M1	Tc
Numbering	KuHa 206-901	MoHa 206-903	MoHa 207-903	SaHa 207–902	MoHa 206–902	MoHa 207–902	Saha 207–901	MoHa 206–901	MoHa 207–901	KuHa 207–901

Cars 3, 6, and 9 were each fitted with one PS21 lozenge-type pantograph.

== Interior ==
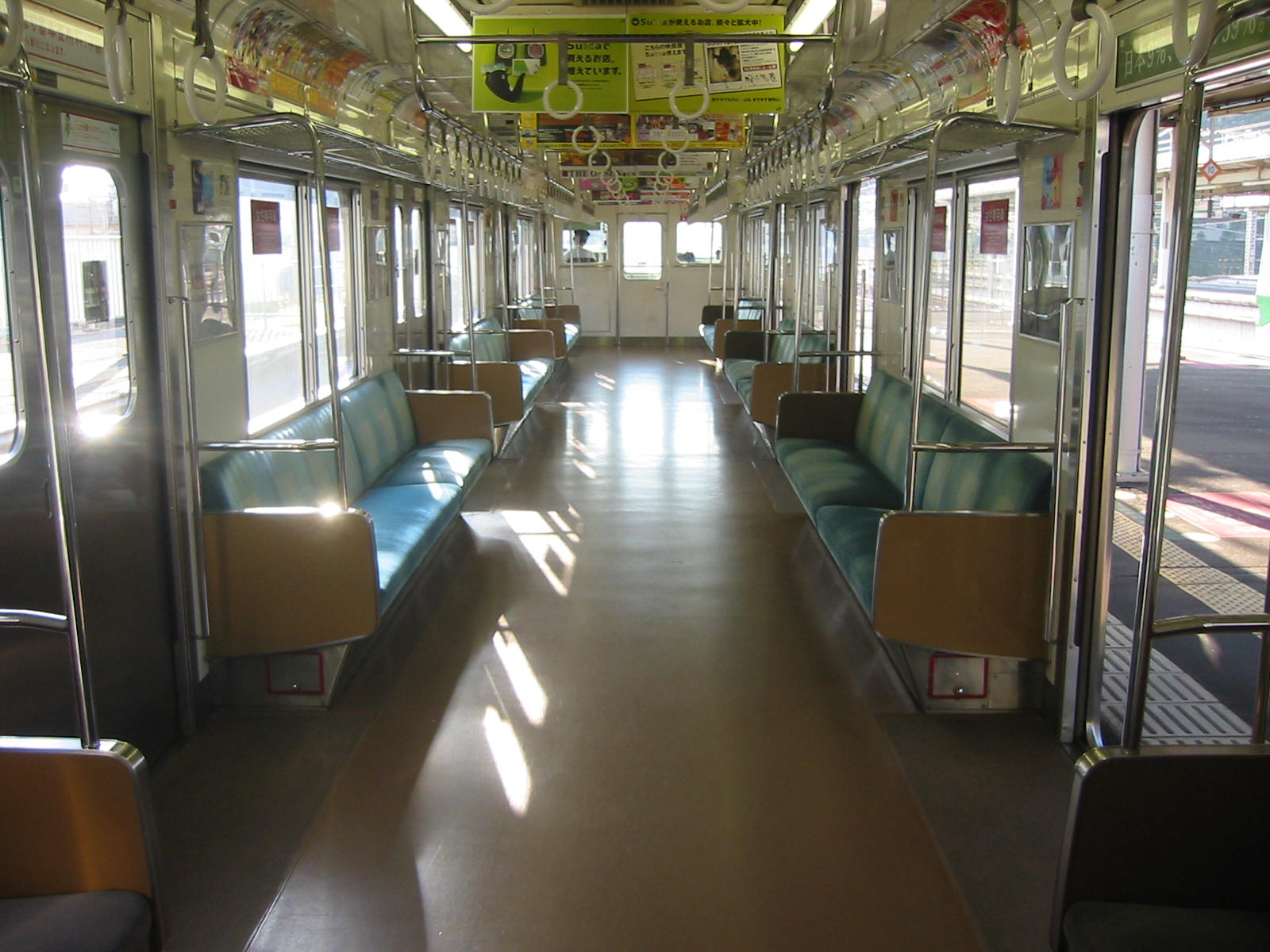
Interior of a 207-900 series car in September 2007

== History ==
The train was delivered to Matsudo Depot in November 1986.

It was withdrawn from service in 2009 following the introduction of new E233-2000 series EMUs, and a final "Sayonara" service was run on 5 December 2009. The train was transferred to Nagano on 5 January 2010 for scrapping.
