= Chiyoda Line =

Subway line in Tokyo, Japan

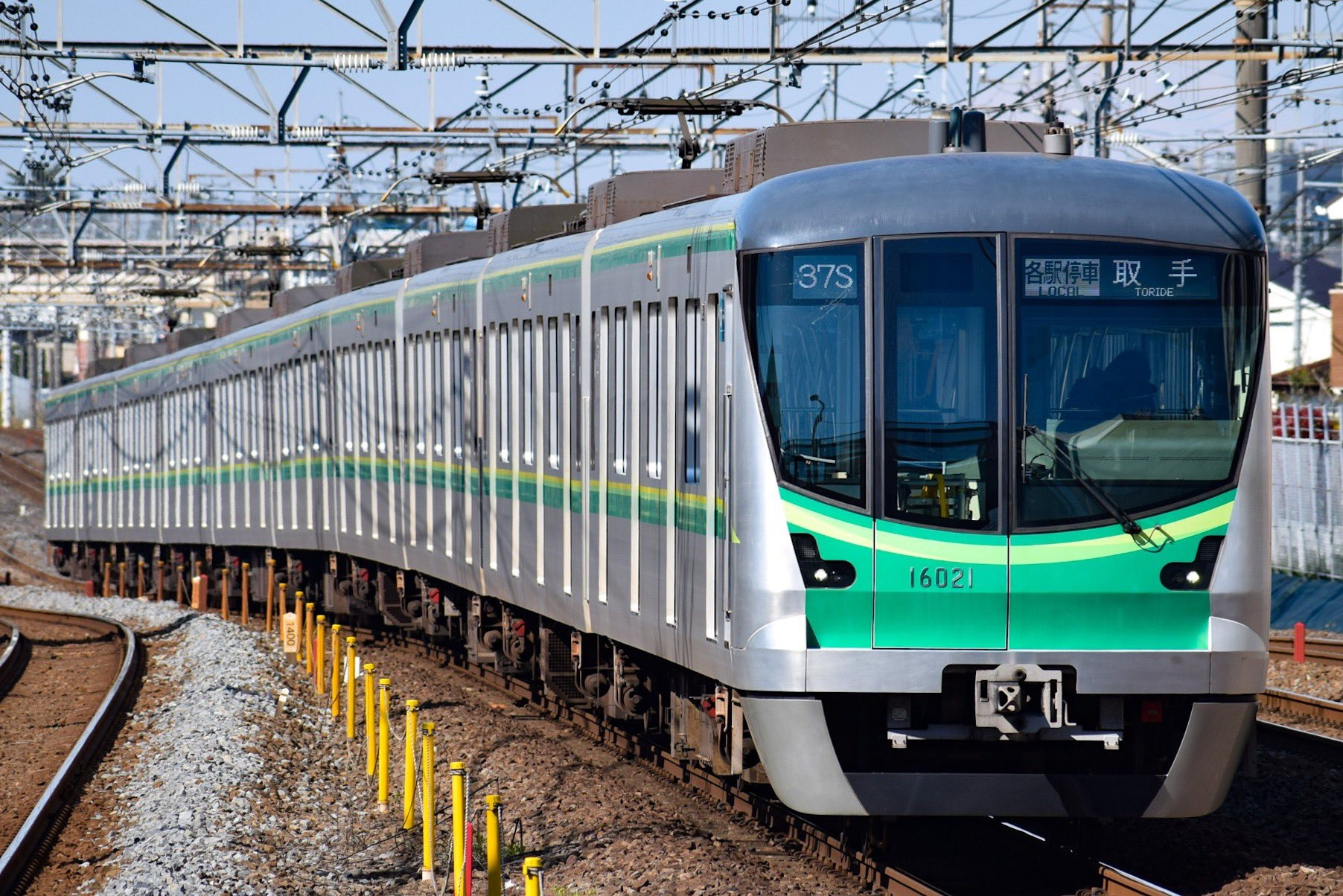
- A Chiyoda Line 16000 series train

Overview
- Other name: Line 9
- Native name: 千代田線
- Owner: Tokyo Metro Co., Ltd.
- Line number: C
- Locale: Tokyo
- Termini: Yoyogi-Uehara; Ayase (Main line) / Kita-Ayase (branch)
- Stations: 20
- Color on map: Green

Service
- Type: Rapid transit
- System: Tokyo subway (Tokyo Metro)
- Operator(s): Tokyo Metro Co., Ltd.
- Depot(s): Ayase, Yoyogi
- Rolling stock: Tokyo Metro 16000 series Tokyo Metro 05 series (for Kita-Ayase Branch Line); Odakyu 4000 series Odakyu 60000 series MSE; JR East E233-2000 series
- Daily ridership: 1,447,730 (2017)

History
- Opened: 20 December 1969; 56 years ago
- Last extension: 1979

Technical
- Line length: 24 km (15 mi)
- Num of tracks: 2
- Track gauge: 1,067 mm (3 ft 6 in)
- Minimum radius: Main line: 160.2 m (526 ft); Branch line: 143.8 m (472 ft)
- Electrification: Overhead line, 1,500 V DC
- Operating speed: Yoyogi-Uehara–Ayase: 80 km/h (50 mph); Ayase–Kita-Ayase: 60 km/h (37 mph)
- Signalling: Cab signalling, Closed block
- Train protection system: New CS-ATC, ATO
- Maximum incline: 3.5%

The Chiyoda Line (Japanese: 千代田線, Hepburn: Chiyoda-sen) is a subway line owned and operated by Tokyo Metro in Tokyo, Japan. On average, the line carries 1,447,730 passengers daily (2017), the second highest of the Tokyo Metro network, behind the Tōzai Line (1,642,378).

The line was named after the Chiyoda ward, under which it passes. On maps, diagrams and signboards, the line is shown using the color green, and its stations are given numbers using the letter "C".

== Overview ==
The 24.0 km (14.91 mi) line serves the wards of Adachi, Arakawa, Bunkyō, Chiyoda, Minato and Shibuya, and a short stretch of tunnel in Taitō with no station. Its official name, rarely used, is Line 9 Chiyoda Line (9号線千代田線, kyūgō sen Chiyoda-sen). The Chiyoda Line was built as a bypass for the older Hibiya Line, with both lines following a similar route and having direct interchanges at three stations. Trains have through running onto other railway lines on both ends. More than half of these are trains to the northeast beyond Ayase onto the East Japan Railway Company (JR East) Joban Line to Abiko (Toride during the rush hour). The rest run to the southwest beyond Yoyogi-Uehara onto the Odakyu Odawara Line to Isehara.

Services on the Kita-Ayase branch consist of a combination of shuttle services to Ayase and through services to Yoyogi-Uehara.

The Chiyoda Line has direct interchanges with all other Tokyo Metro and Toei lines with the exception of the Toei Oedo Line. However, Yushima Station is located relatively close to Ueno-okachimachi Station on the Oedo Line without being marked as an official transfer between the lines.

According to the Tokyo Metropolitan Bureau of Transportation, as of June 2009 the Chiyoda Line was the second most crowded subway line in Tokyo, at its peak running at 181%^{[a]} capacity between Machiya and Nishi-Nippori stations. In 2016 congestion was reported at 178%. In both fiscal years 2021 & 2022 the congestion rate had dropped to 139%, as a consequence of the COVID-19 pandemic.

== History ==
=== Planning ===
The Chiyoda Line was originally proposed in 1962 as a route running from “Kitami – Harajuku – Nagatachō – Hibiya – Ikenohata – Nippori – Matsudo” under Urban Transportation Council Report No. 6 (都市交通審議会答申第6号); the initial name was Line 8.

In a revision issued in January 1964, it was indicated that the section from Nippori to Matsudo would connect to the Jōban Line via Nishi-Nippori, Machiya, and Kita-Senju, with the Jōban Line extended beyond Ayase. A further revision in March specified that the Odakyū Odawara Line would be extended between Kitami and Yoyogi-Uehara to serve the section from Kitami to Harajuku.

The original proposal envisioned a separate subway line branching from the Odakyu Line at Kitami Station, running beneath Setagaya-dōri and passing through Wakabayashi and Komaba to Harajuku. However, due to issues such as operational conflicts with the Odakyu Line, the current plan was adopted, in which Odakyu services are extended from Kitami and diverge at Yoyogi-Uehara.

On December 16, 1964, Line 8 was formally designated as Line 9, officially named the Tokyo Metropolitan Rapid Transit Line No. 9, and the 32.5 km section between Kitami and Ayase was finalized. However, until April 1968, the line number differed by authority: it was referred to as Line 8 by the Urban Transportation Council under the Ministry of Construction, while the Tokyo Metropolitan Government designated it as Line 9. The Chiyoda Line was constructed before Urban Planning Route No. 7 (the Tokyo Metro Namboku Line) and Route No. 8 (the Yūrakuchō Line) because the Jōban Line had reached the limits of its capacity at the time. Reducing the severe overcrowding on the Jōban Line, which had been a factor underlying the conditions that led to the Mikawashima train crash, was considered an urgent priority.

Line 9 was designed to pass through built-up areas in Chiyoda, and also intended to relieve the busy Ginza Line and Hibiya Line, which follow a roughly similar route through central Tokyo.

The name of this line was chosen through the first employee naming competition held by the Teito Rapid Transit Authority (TRTA), the predecessor of Tokyo Metro. A total of 1,443 submissions proposing 205 different line names were received. After review, Chiyoda Line was selected, having received the largest number of submissions (208 employees proposed the name). Other proposed names included "Otemachi Line" and "Namboku Line (South-North Line)."

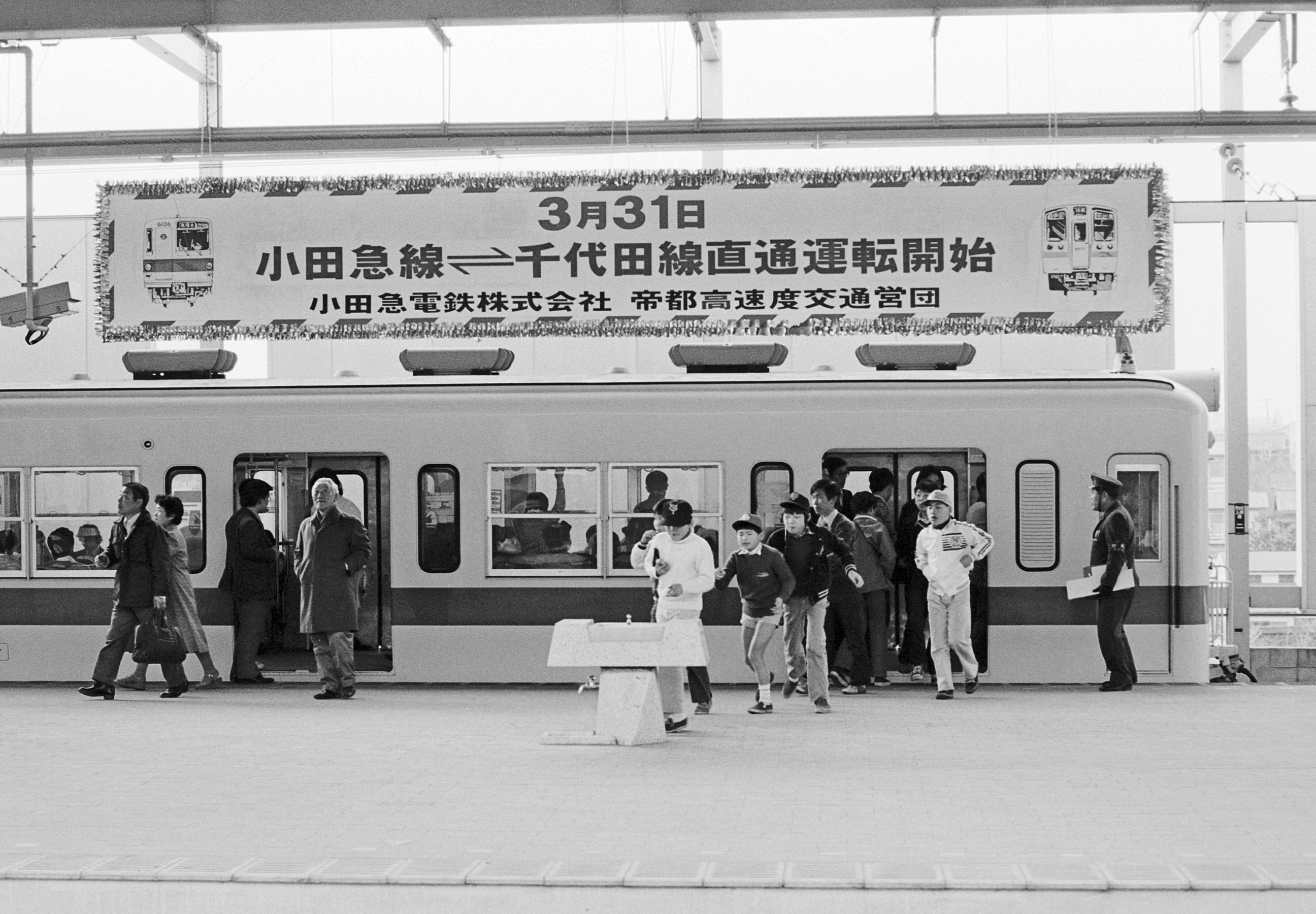
Opening ceremony of through services at Yoyogi-Uehara Station, with an Odakyu 9000 series and TRTA 6000 series present, March 31, 1978

=== Construction ===
On July 30, 1966, construction began with work on subsequent sections commencing sequentially thereafter.

The first stretch was opened on December 20, 1969 between Kita-Senju and Ōtemachi. The line was almost completed by October 10, 1972 when it reached Yoyogi-Kōen, although the 1 km (0.62 mi) section to Yoyogi-Uehara was not completed until March 31, 1978.

The branch line to Kita-Ayase was opened on December 20, 1979. This branch primarily serves as a connection to Ayase Depot, but also serves Kita-Ayase Station constructed in the area. A three-car shuttle service operated between Ayase and Kita-Ayase.

The Chiyoda Line was one of the lines targeted in the Aum sarin gas attack on March 20, 1995.

On May 15, 2006, women-only cars were introduced on early-morning trains from Toride on the Joban Line to Yoyogi-Uehara.

On March 18, 2008, the Chiyoda Line became the first subway line in Japan with operations by reserved-seating trains when Odakyu Romancecar limited express services began running between Kita-Senju and Hakone-Yumoto (on the Hakone Tozan Line) and Karakida (on the Odakyu Tama Line). Trains also run from/to Shin-Kiba using tracks connecting to the Yurakucho Line.

On March 16, 2019, 10-car trains commenced operation on the branch line to Kita-Ayase station after platforms were lengthened by 135m, allowing direct services from Kita-Ayase to Yoyogi-Uehara.

== Basic data ==
- Distance: 24.0 km (14.91 mi)
- Double-tracking: Entire line
- Railway signalling: New CS-ATC

=== Metro Morning Way, Metro Homeway and Metro Hakone ===
Metro Morning Way and Metro Homeway and are fully reserved seat commuter trains operating between Hon Atsugi on the Odakyu Odawara Line and Kita-Senju on the Chiyoda Line using 60000 series MSE Romancecar trains. These services require a seat reservation as well as payment of the Limited Express fee. Tickets can be purchased online or at ticket vending machines or ticket counters at Odakyu stations. Travel wholly within the Chiyoda Line is not permitted.

As of July 2024, on weekdays there are 2 Metro Morning Way services to Kita-Senju arriving 07:53 & 09:40, and there are 5 Metro Homeway services departing Otemachi hourly between 17:30 & 21:30 of which only the 18:30 departure commences from Kita-Senju at 18:14. On weekends and holidays there is one Metro Morning Way service to Kita-Senju arriving 09:46 and 2 Metro Homeway services departing Kita-Senju at 19:35 & 20:35.

Metro Hakone is a similar service operating in the counter-peak direction between Kita-Senju and Hakone-Yumoto on the Hakone Tozan Line to serve visitors to Hakone, with a travel time of approximately 2 hours. On weekdays there is 1 trip in each direction, departing Kita-Senju at 09:47 and arriving back at Kita-Senju at 16:46. On weekends and holidays there are 3 trips in each direction: departing Kita-Senju at 08:33, 10:37 & 15:22, arriving back at Kita-Senju at 12:47, 18:21 & 19:53.

== Stations ==
List of Chiyoda line stations

- All stations are located in Tokyo.
- Stopping patterns:
  - Commuter Semi Express, Local, Semi Express, and Express trains stop at every station.
  - Odakyu Romancecar Metro Morning Way and Metro Homeway limited express services stop at stations marked "●" and does not stop at those marked "｜".

| No. | Station | Japanese | Distance (km) | | Limited Express | Transfers | Location |
| No. | Station | Japanese | Between stations | From C-01 | Limited Express | Transfers | Location |
|---|---|---|---|---|---|---|---|
↑ Through-services to/from: ↑: Seijōgakuen-mae, Mukōgaoka-Yūen, to Sagami-Ōno, to/from Hon-Atsugi, Isehara via Odawara Line; To/from Karakida via Tama Line; Limited express Metro Morning Way/Metro Home Way to/from Hon-Atsugi via Odawara Line; Limited express Metro Hakone to/from Hakone-Yumoto via Hakone Tozan Line; Limited express Metro Enoshima to/from Katase-Enoshima via Enoshima Line
| C-01 | Yoyogi-Uehara | 代々木上原 (Note: Yoyogi-Uehara is shared by both Odakyu Electric Railway and Tokyo Metro; Odakyu Electric Railway manages the station.) | - | 0.0 | ※ (Note: Limited express services stop at Yoyogi-Uehara to change drivers and conductors, but passengers may not board or disembark at this station.) | Odawara Line (OH05) | Shibuya |
| C-02 | Yoyogi-koen | 代々木公園 | 1.0 | 1.0 | | | Odawara Line (Yoyogi-Hachiman: OH04) | Shibuya |
| C-03 | Meiji-jingumae (Harajuku) | 明治神宮前 | 1.2 | 2.2 | | | Fukutoshin Line (F-15); Yamanote Line (Harajuku: JY19) | Shibuya |
| C-04 | Omotesandō | 表参道 | 0.9 | 3.1 | ● | Ginza Line (G-02); Hanzōmon Line (Z-02) | Minato |
| C-05 | Nogizaka | 乃木坂 | 1.4 | 4.5 | | | | Minato |
| C-06 | Akasaka | 赤坂 | 1.1 | 5.6 | | | | Minato |
| C-07 | Kokkai-gijidō-mae | 国会議事堂前 | 0.8 | 6.4 | | | Ginza Line (Tameike-sanno: G-06); Marunouchi Line (M-14); Namboku Line (Tameike-sanno: N-06) | Chiyoda |
| C-08 | Kasumigaseki | 霞ケ関 | 0.8 | 7.2 | ● | Marunouchi Line (M-15); Hibiya Line (H-07) | Chiyoda |
| C-09 | Hibiya | 日比谷 | 0.8 | 8.0 | | | Hibiya Line (H-08); Yūrakuchō Line (Yūrakuchō: Y-18); Mita Line (I-08); Yamanote Line (Yūrakuchō: JY30); Keihin–Tōhoku Line (Yūrakuchō: JK25); Underground passage to Ginza, Higashi-ginza stations | Chiyoda |
| C-10 | Nijūbashimae | 二重橋前 | 0.7 | 8.7 | | | Marunouchi Line (Tokyo: M-17); Keiyō Line (Tokyo: JE01) | Chiyoda |
| C-11 | Ōtemachi | 大手町 | 0.7 | 9.4 | ● | Marunouchi Line (M-18); Tōzai Line (T-09); Hanzōmon Line (Z-08); Mita Line (I-09) | Chiyoda |
| C-12 | Shin-ochanomizu | 新御茶ノ水 | 1.3 | 10.7 | | | Marunouchi Line (Awajicho: M-19); Shinjuku Line (Ogawamachi: S-07); Chūō–Sōbu Line (Ochanomizu: JC18); Chūō Line (Ochanomizu: JC03) | Chiyoda |
| C-13 | Yushima | 湯島 | 1.2 | 11.9 | | | Tsukuba Express (Shin-okachimachi: TX02); Ginza Line (Ueno-hirokoji: G-15); Hibiya Line (Naka-okachimachi: H-17); Ōedo Line (Ueno-okachimachi: E-09); Yamanote Line (Okachimachi: JY04); Keihin–Tōhoku Line (Okachimachi: JK29) | Bunkyō |
| C-14 | Nezu | 根津 | 1.2 | 13.1 | | | | Bunkyō |
| C-15 | Sendagi | 千駄木 | 1.0 | 14.1 | | | | Bunkyō |
| C-16 | Nishi-Nippori | 西日暮里 | 0.9 | 15.0 | | | Yamanote Line (JY08); Keihin–Tōhoku Line (JK33); Nippori–Toneri Liner (NT02) | Arakawa |
| C-17 | Machiya | 町屋 | 1.7 | 16.7 | | | Main Line (KS04); Toden Arakawa Line (Machiya-ekimae: SA06) | Arakawa |
| C-18 | Kita-Senju | 北千住 (Note: Kita-senju and Ayase are shared by both JR East and Tokyo Metro; Tokyo Metro manages both stations.) (Note: Between Kita-senju Station and Ayase Station, the Chiyoda Line uses JR East's Joban Line (Local) fare system.) | 2.6 | 19.3 | ● | Hibiya Line (H-22); Jōban Line (Rapid) (JJ05); Tobu Skytree Line (TS09); Tsukuba Express (TX05) | Adachi |
| C-19 | Ayase | 綾瀬 | 2.6 | 21.9 | | Jōban Line (Local) (JL19); For Kita-ayase | Adachi |
↓ Through-services to/from Matsudo, Kashiwa, Abiko, Toride via Jōban Line (Local) ↓
| C-20 | Kita-Ayase | 北綾瀬 | 2.1 | 24.0 | | | Adachi |

== Rolling stock ==
As of 1 January 2019, the following train types are used on the line, all running as ten-car formations unless otherwise indicated.

=== Tokyo Metro ===
- 16000 series (x37) (since November 2010)
- 05 series 3-car trains (x4) (since April 2014, used on Kita-Ayase Branch)
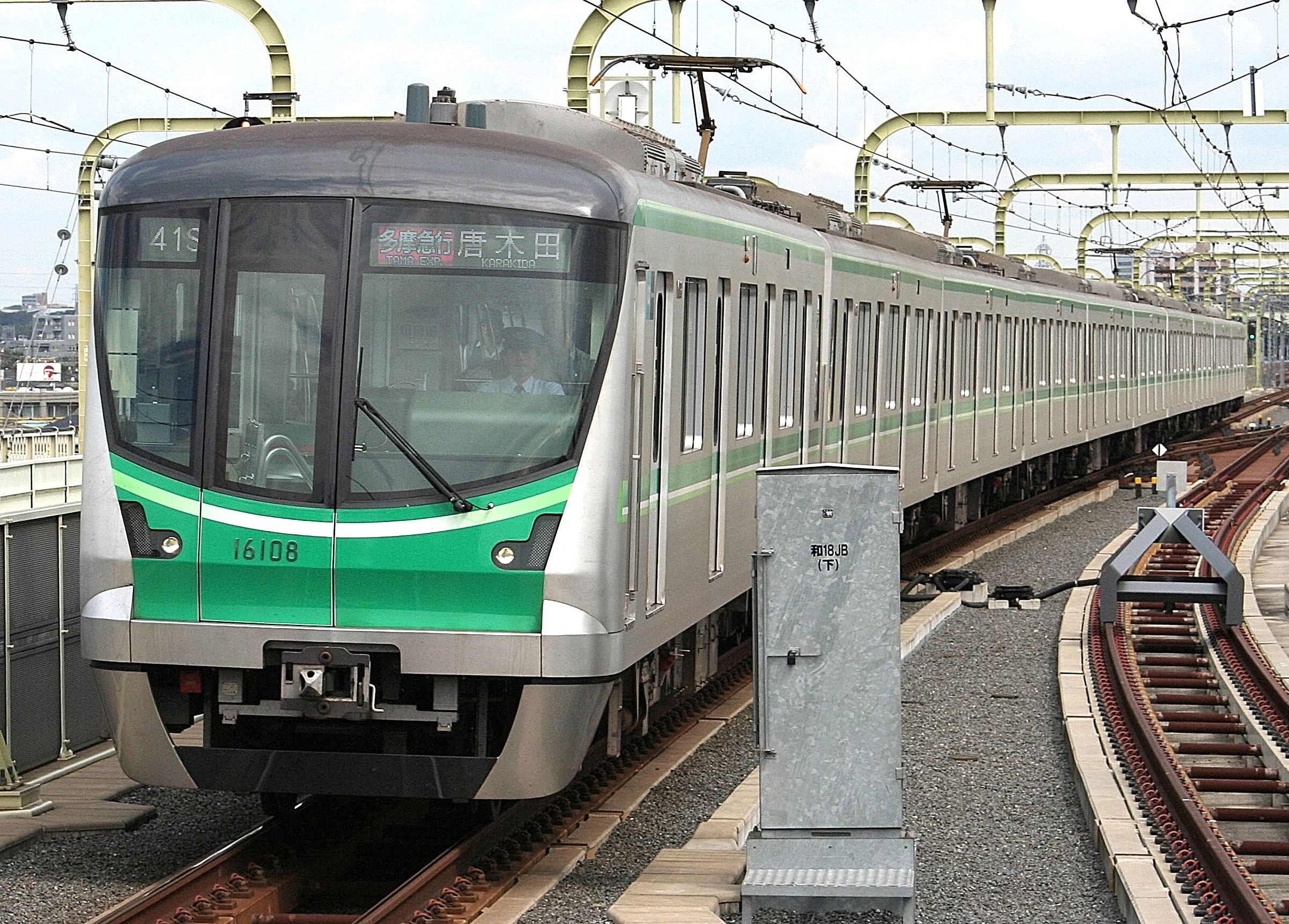
16000 series 10-car set in September 2011

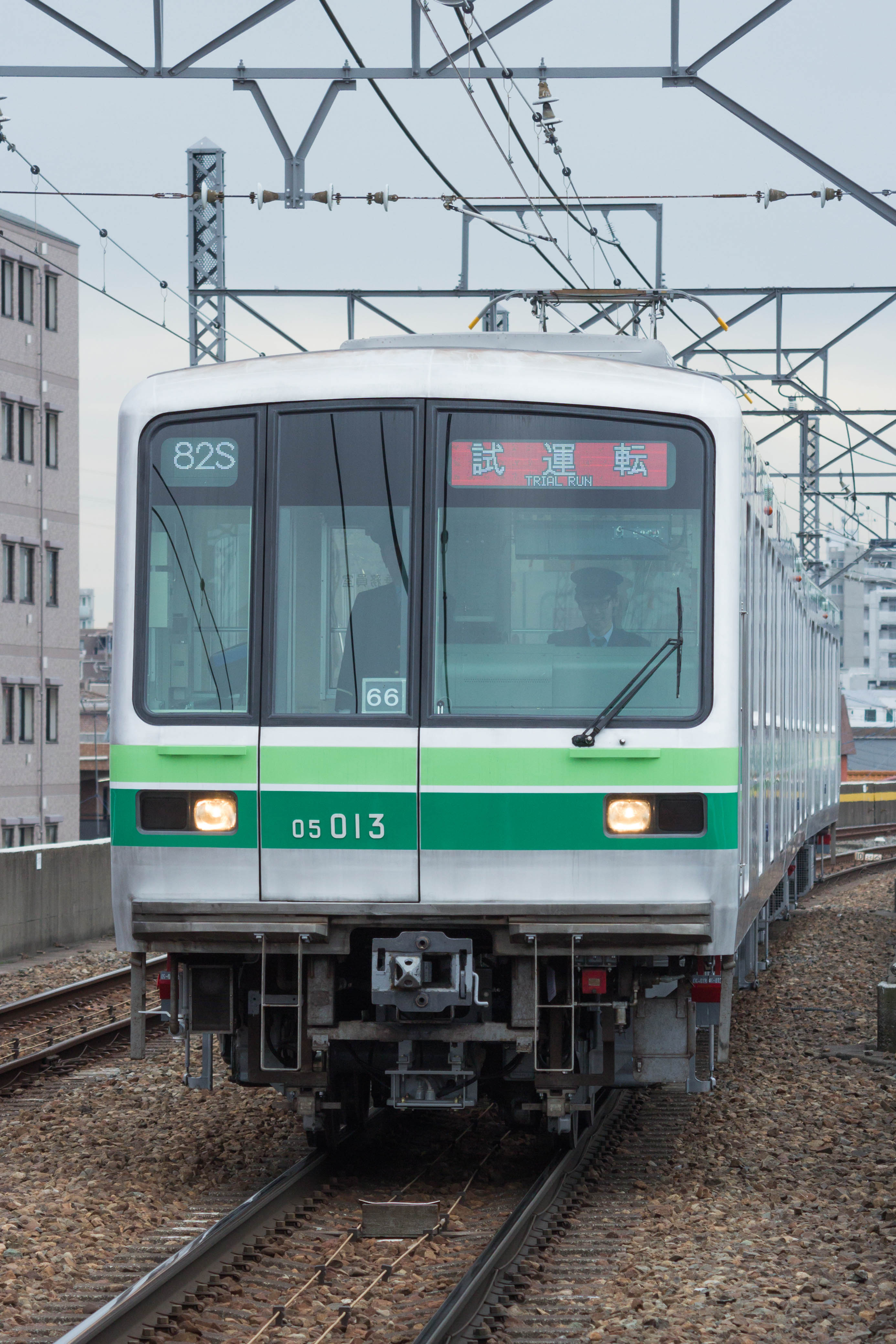
05 series 3-car set in March 2014

=== Odakyu ===
- 4000 series (since September 2007)
- 60000 series MSE (since spring 2008, used on Metro Morning Way, Metro Homeway & Metro Hakone services)
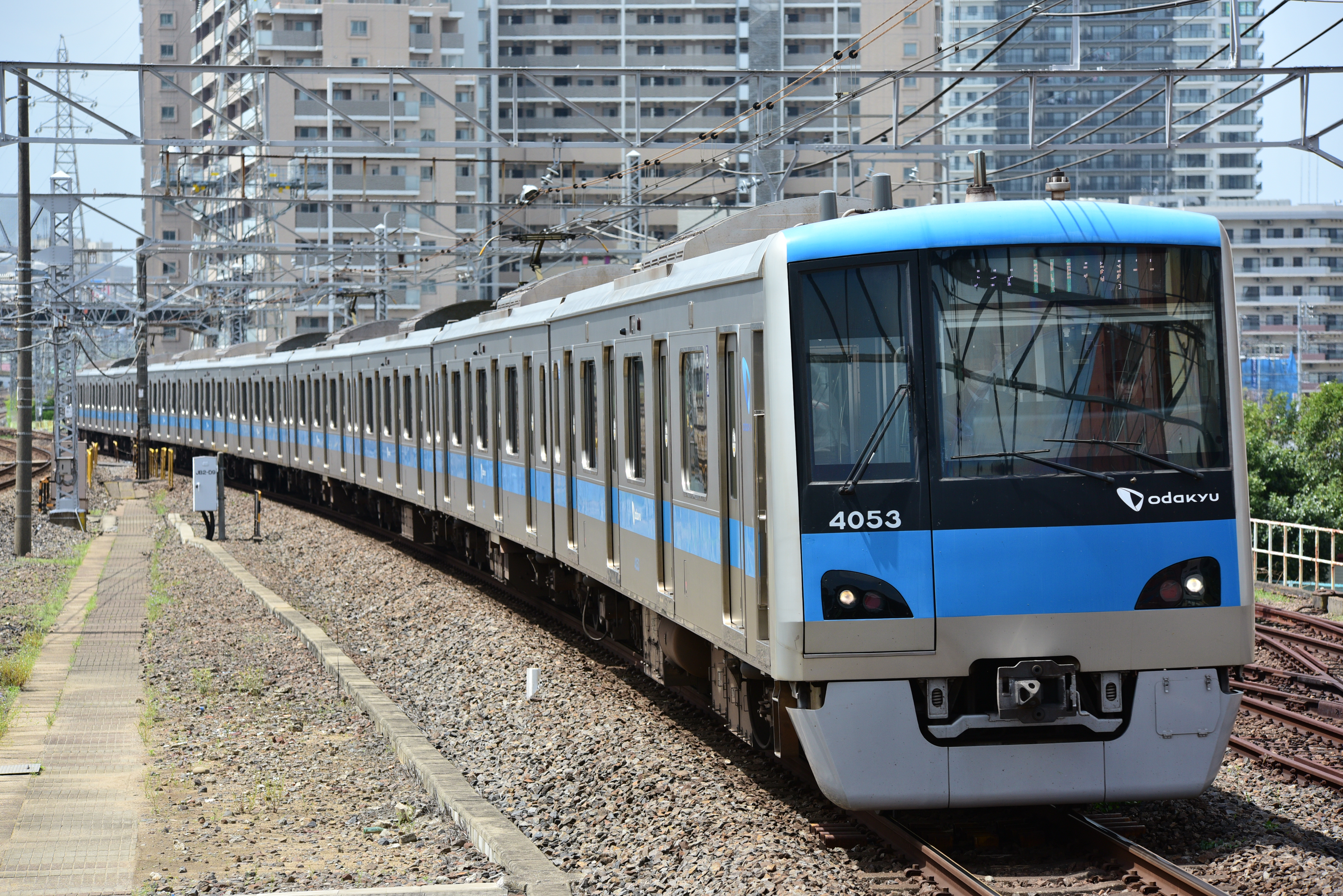
An Odakyu 4000 series set in April 2016

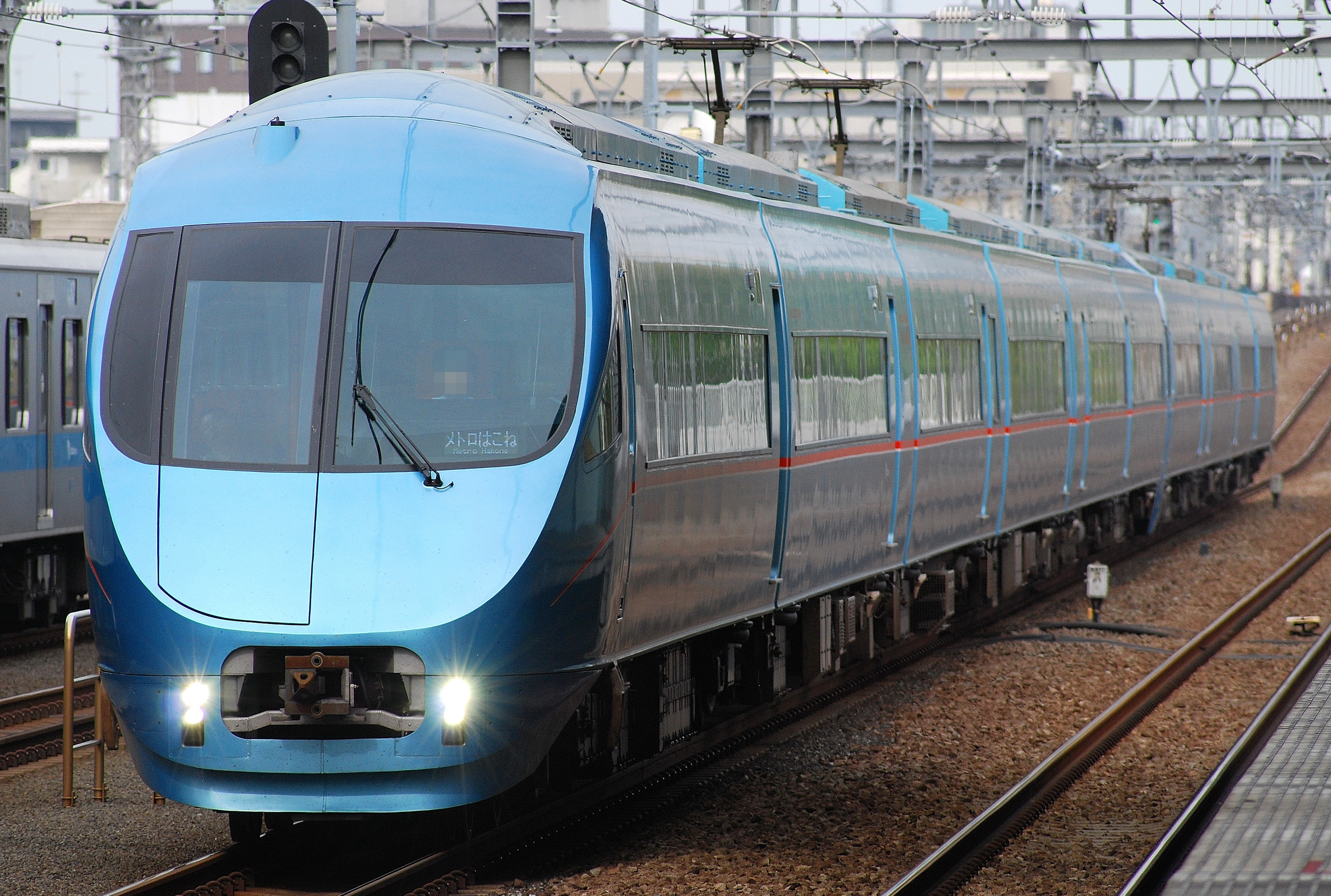
An Odakyu 60000 series MSE Romancecar EMU on a Metro Hakone service in April 2012

=== JR East ===
- E233-2000 series (x19) (since summer 2009)
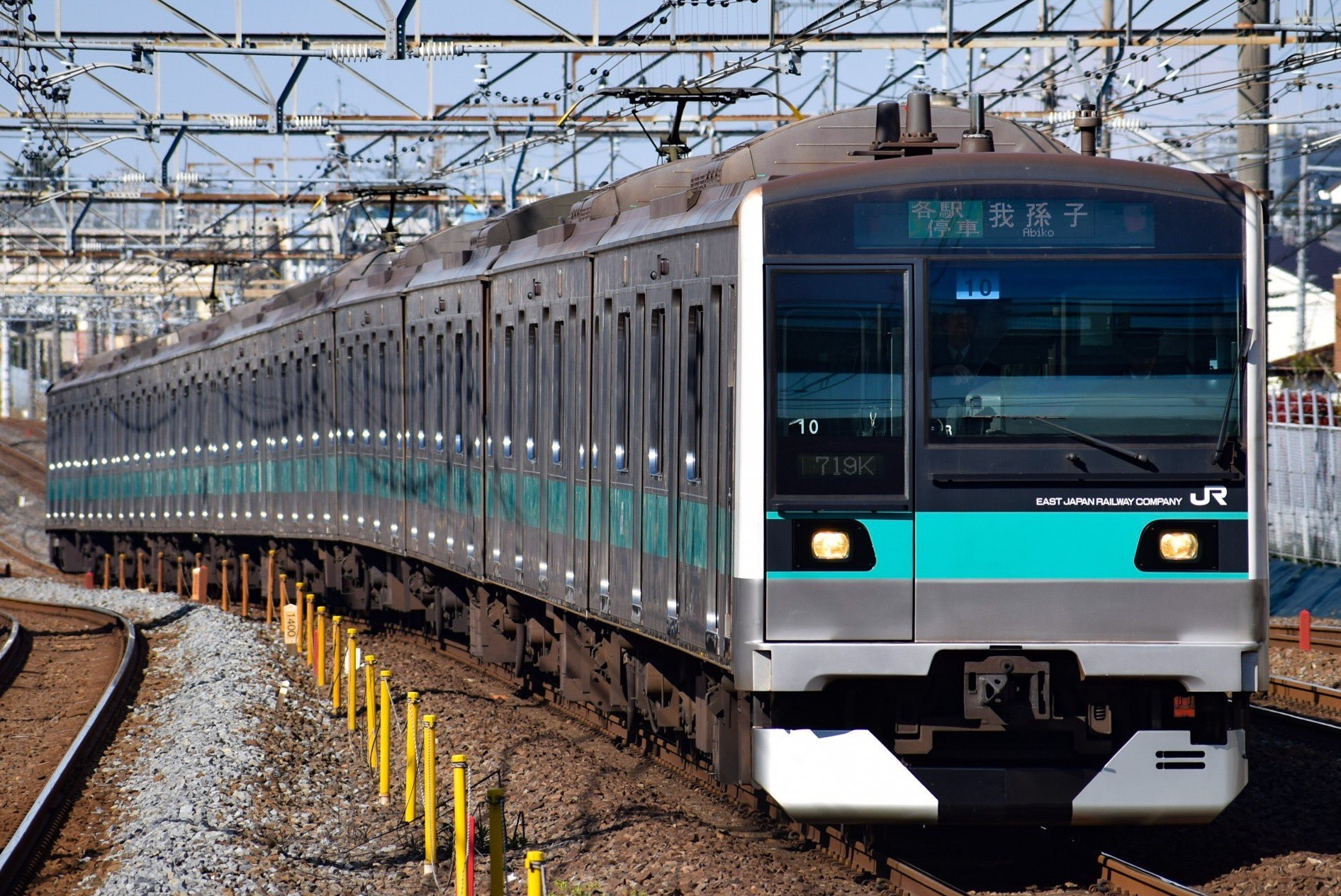
A Jōban Line/Tokyo Metro Chiyoda Line E233-2000 series set in April 2019

=== Former rolling stock ===
- 6000 series (x35) (from 1971 until November 2018)
- JNR 103-1000 series (x16) (from 1971 until April 1986)
- JR East 203 series (x17) (from August 27, 1982 until September 26, 2011)
- JR East 209-1000 series (x2) (from 1999 until October 13, 2018)
- JNR 207–900 series (x1) (from 1986 until December 2009)
- 5000 series 3-car trains (x2) (from 1969 until 2014, later used on branch line)
- 6000 series 3-car train (x1) (prototype of the series built in 1968 until 2014, used on branch line)
- 06 series (x1) (from 1993 until January 2015)
- 07 series (x1) (September 2008 – December 2008)
- Odakyu 1000 series (1988–2010)
- Odakyu 9000 series (1978–1990)
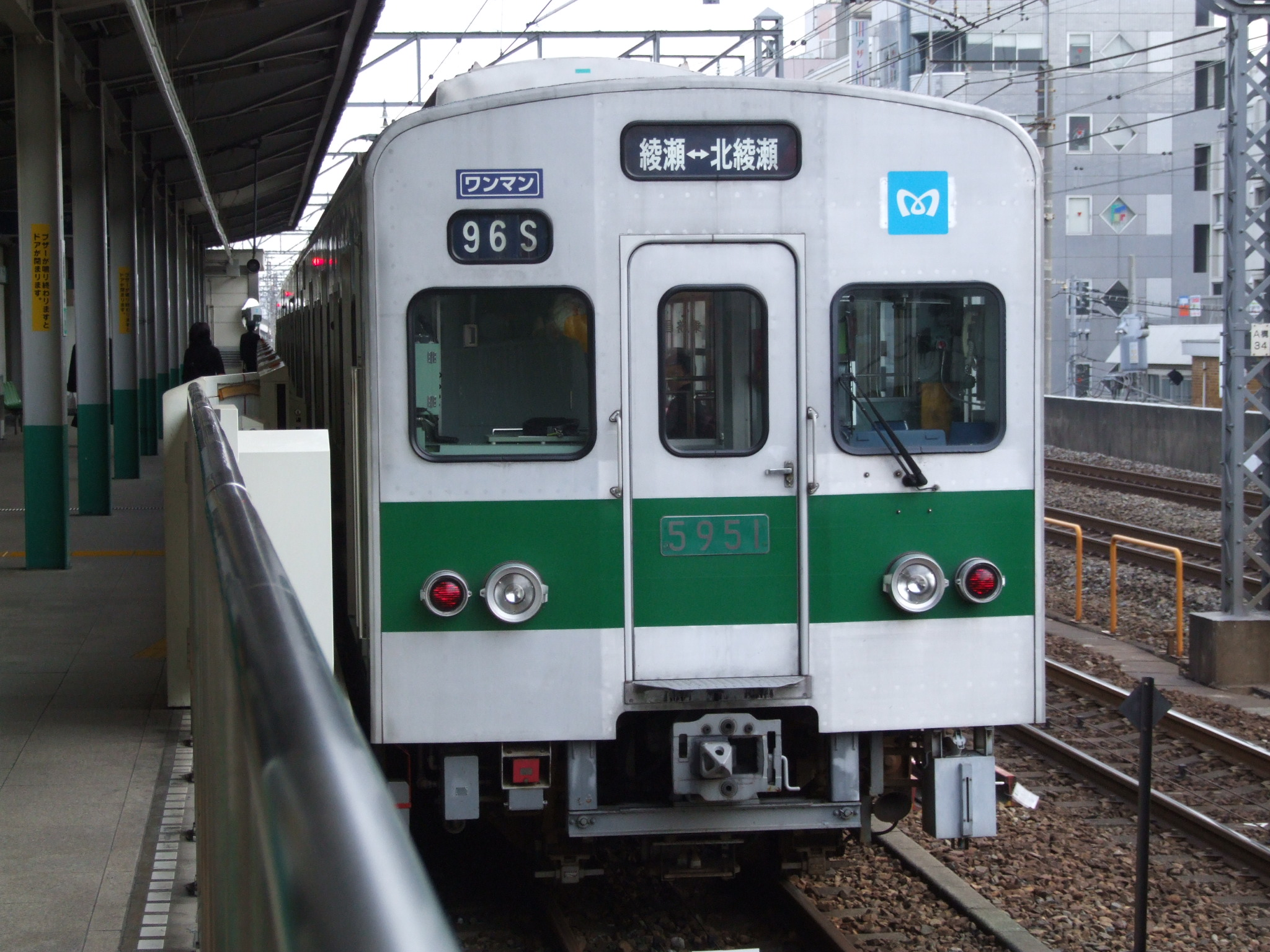
5000 series (Aluminum prototype)

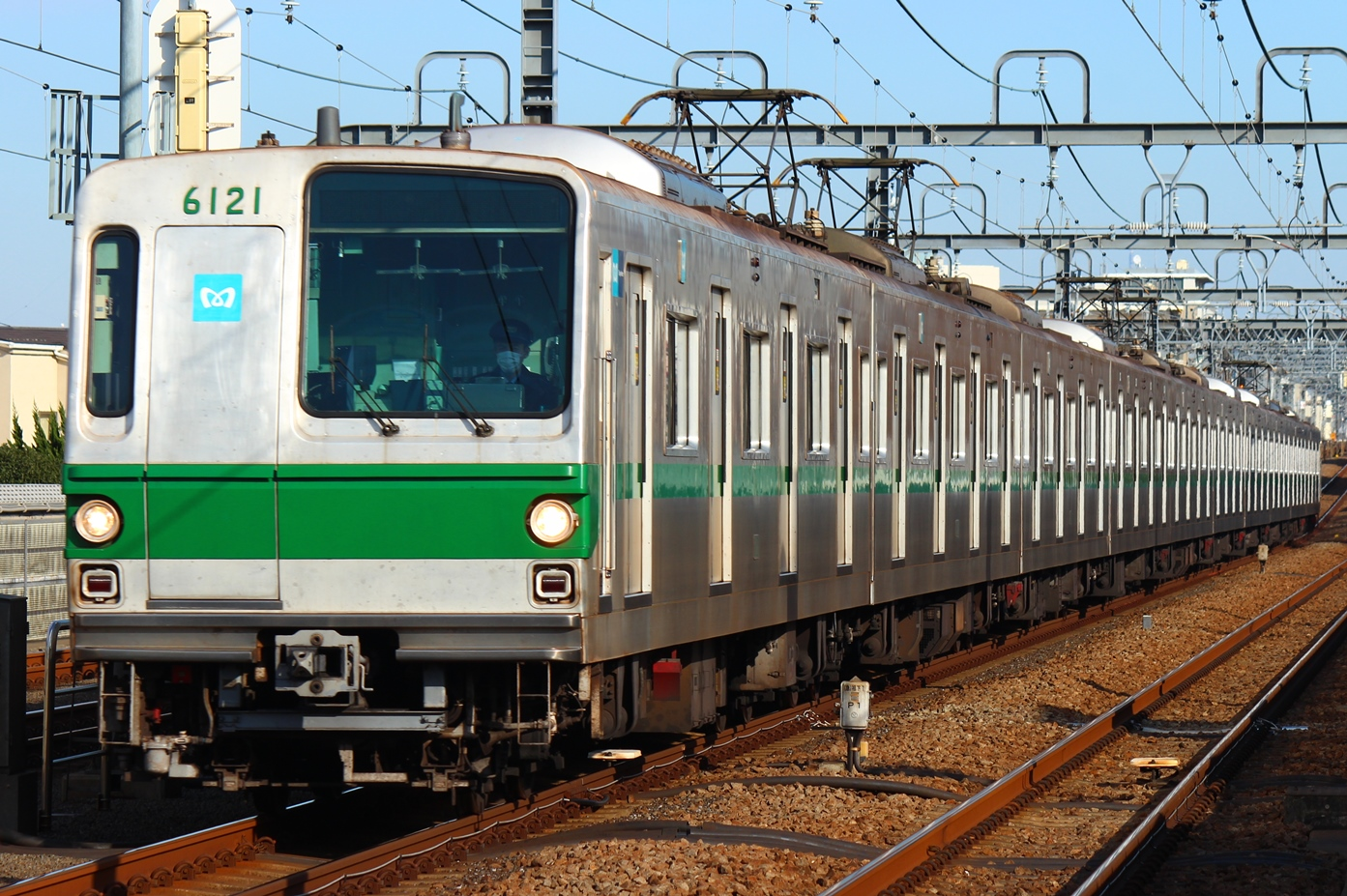
A Tokyo Metro 6000 series set in December 2014

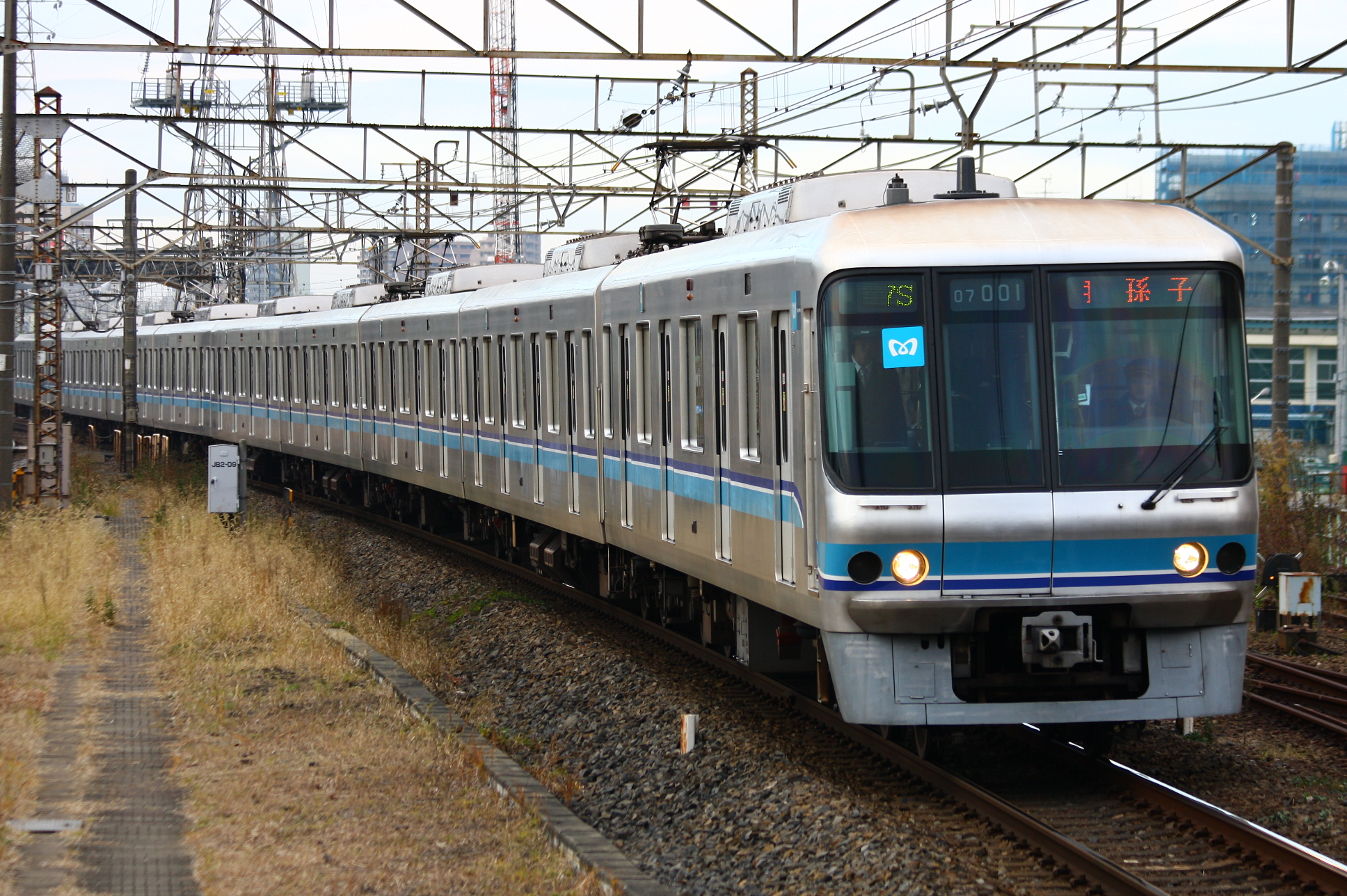
An 07 series set in December 2008

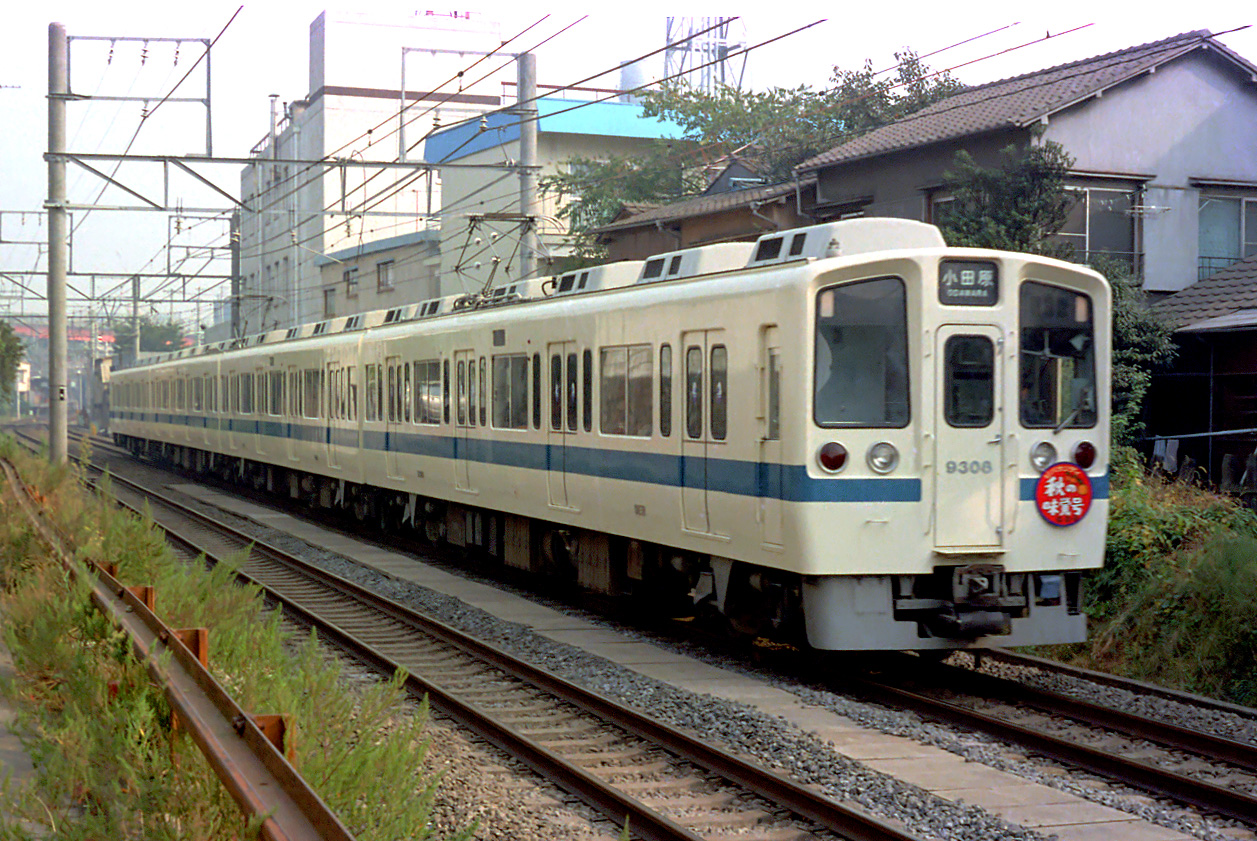
An Odakyu 9000 series set in October 1977

== Notes ==
a. Crowding levels defined by the Ministry of Land, Infrastructure, Transport and Tourism:

100% — Commuters have enough personal space and are able to take a seat or stand while holding onto the straps or hand rails.
150% — Commuters have enough personal space to read a newspaper.
180% — Commuters must fold newspapers to read.
200% — Commuters are pressed against each other in each compartment but can still read small magazines.
250% — Commuters are pressed against each other, unable to move.
