= Kita-Ayase Station =

Metro station in Tokyo, Japan

Coordinates: 35.777057°N 139.832118°E

Kita-ayase Station 北綾瀬駅

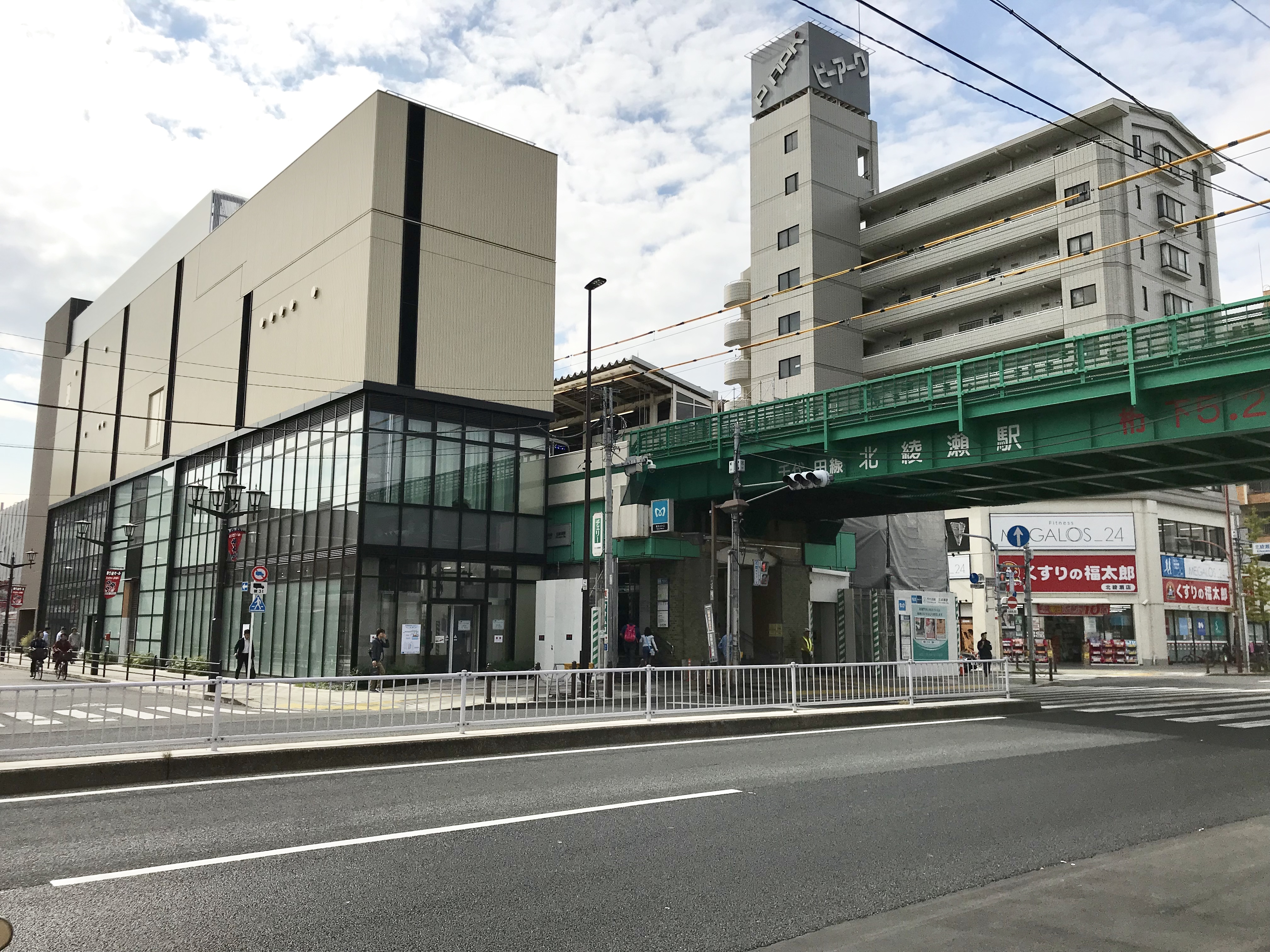
- Central entrance, November 2018

General information
- Location: 2 Yanaka, Adachi, Tokyo （足立区谷中2丁目） Japan
- Operator: Tokyo Metro
- Line: Chiyoda Line
- Connections: Bus stop

Construction
- Structure type: Elevated

Other information
- Station code: C-20

History
- Opened: 20 December 1979; 46 years ago

Passengers
- FY2011: 25,225 daily

Services
Preceding station	Tokyo Metro	Following station
Ayase towards Yoyogi-Uehara	Chiyoda Line	Terminus
Location
- Location within Special wards of Tokyo Location within Tokyo Bay and Bōsō Peninsula Location within Tokyo Location within Japan

Kita-ayase Station (北綾瀬駅, Kita-ayase-eki) is a railway station in Adachi, Tokyo, Japan, operated by the Tokyo subway operator Tokyo Metro.

== Lines ==
Kita-ayase Station forms the terminus of the 24 km Tokyo Metro Chiyoda Line from Yoyogi-Uehara Station, as of March 16, 2019.

Upon opening a 3-car shuttle service operated to Ayase Station. From March 16, 2019, after platforms were lengthened, 10-car trains commenced operation allowing direct services to Yoyogi-Uehara.

Services on the Kita-ayase branch consist of a combination of shuttle services to Ayase and through services to Yoyogi-Uehara.

== Station layout ==
The station has a single elevated side platform serving one track. The platform is now 10 cars long.

=== Platform ===
1	Chiyoda Line	for Ayase, Kita-Senju and Yoyogi-Uehara; Odakyu Odawara Line for Hon-Atsugi and Isehara

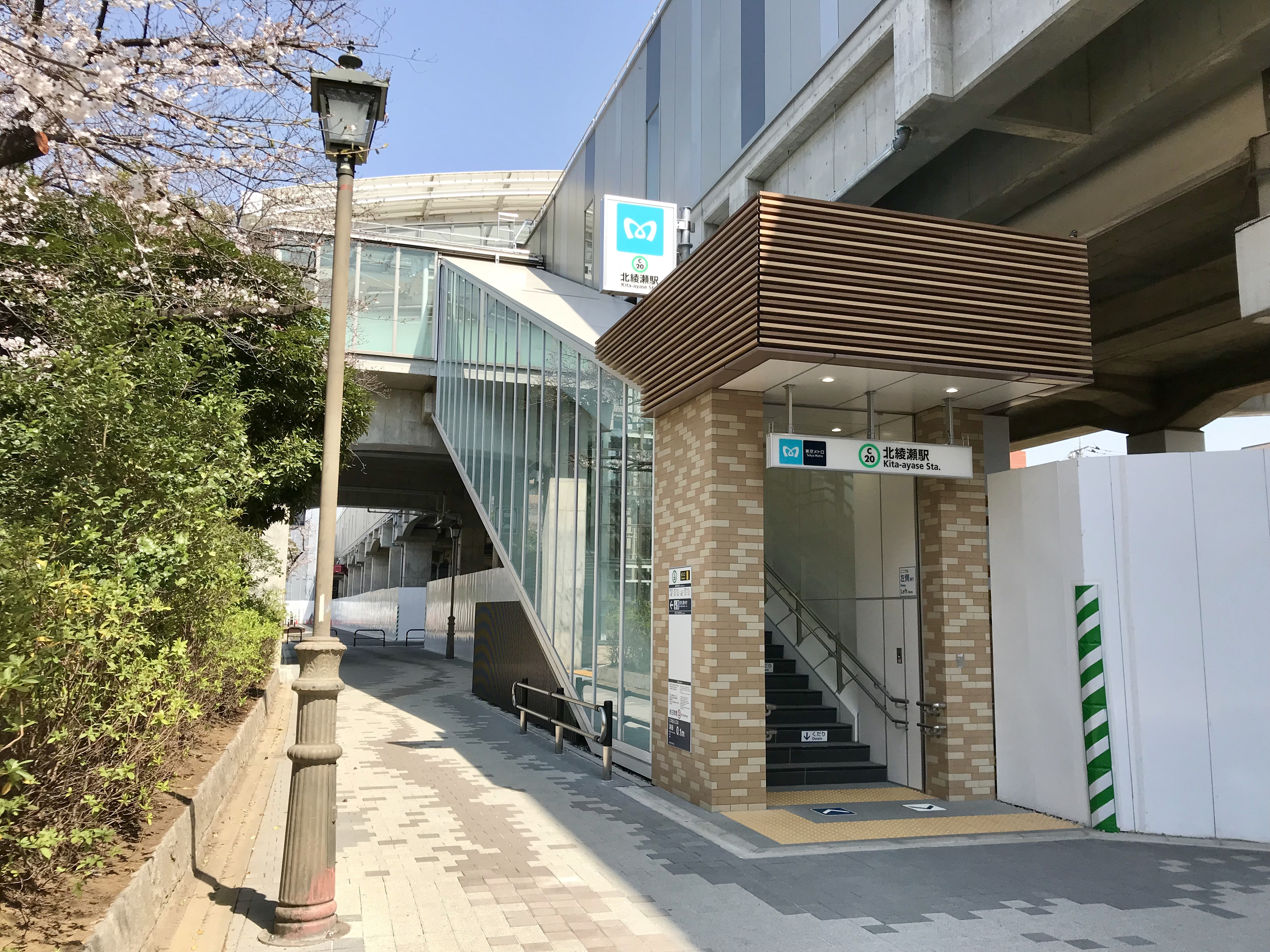
South entrance, March 2019

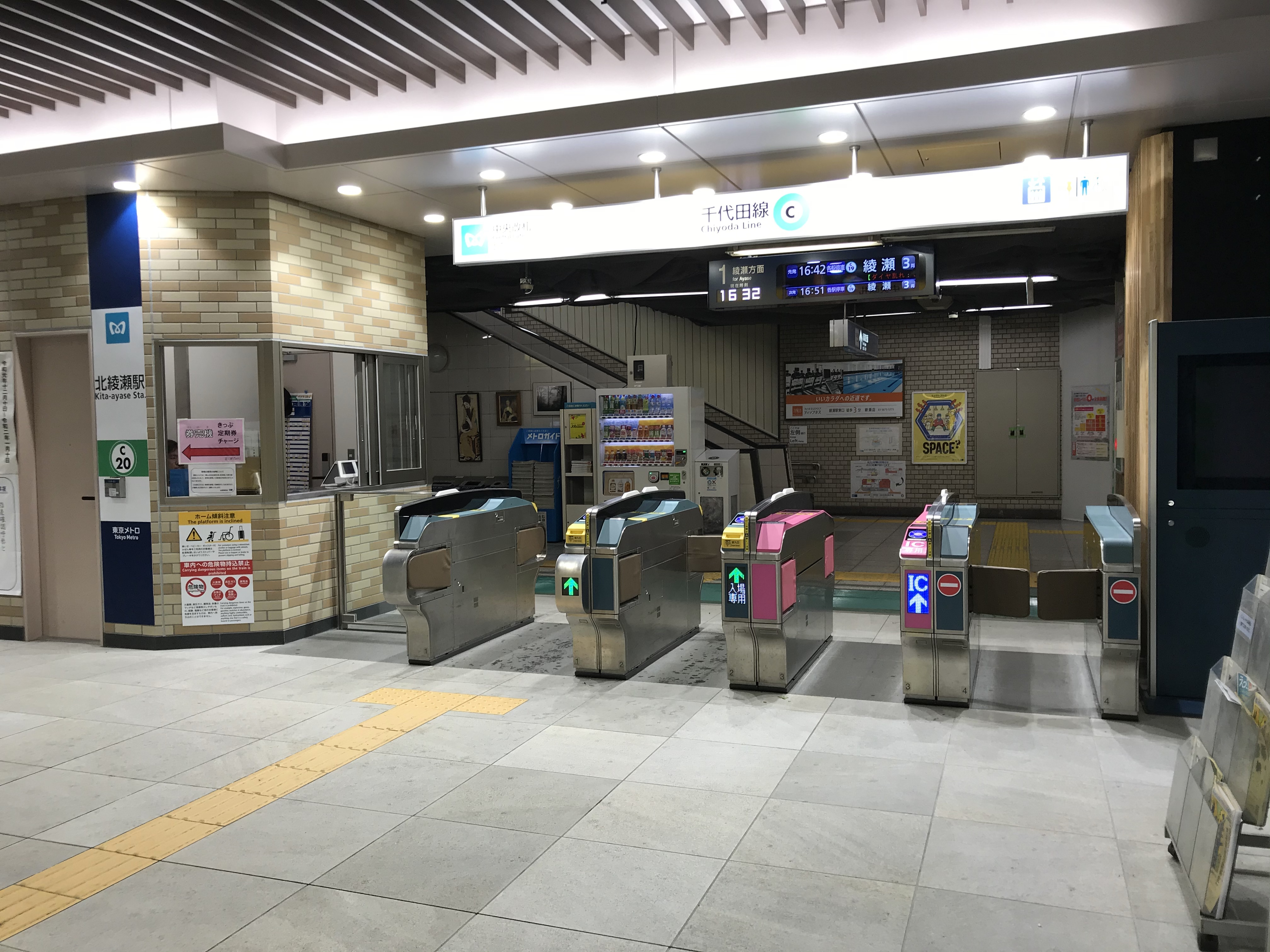
The central gate, 2019

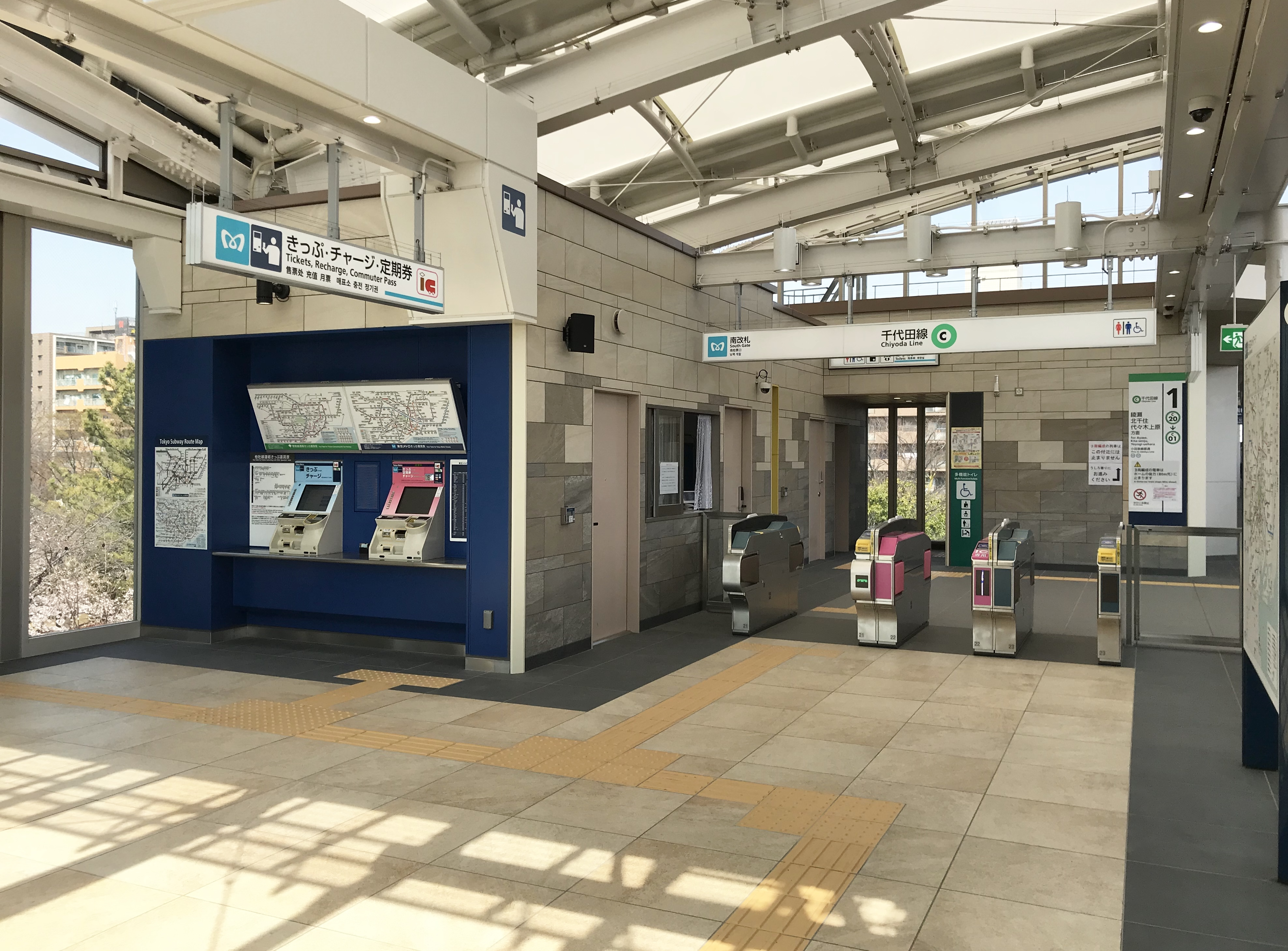
The south gate, 2019

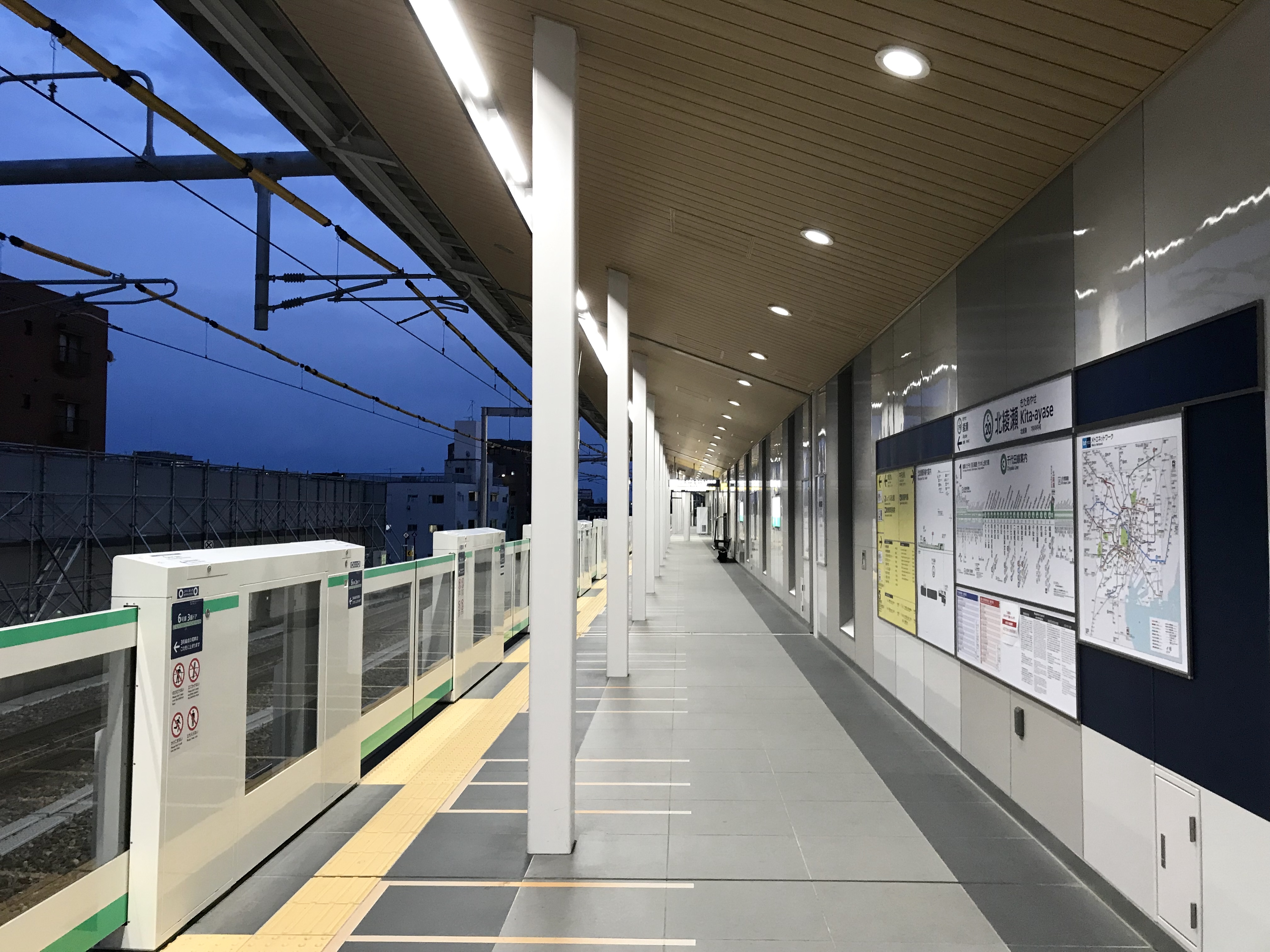
The platform at night, 2019

== History ==
Kita-Ayase Station was opened on 20 December 1979 by the Teito Rapid Transit Authority (TRTA).

The station facilities were inherited by Tokyo Metro after the privatization of the Teito Rapid Transit Authority (TRTA) in 2004.

The station underwent rebuilding work to extend the platforms approximately 135 m (443 ft) toward Ayase Station to allow ten-car through trains to operate to and from the main Chiyoda Line. New station entrances were also added. 10 car service began on March 16, 2019.

== Passenger statistics ==
In fiscal 2011, the station was used by an average of 25,225 passengers daily.
