= Ayase Station =

Railway and metro station in Tokyo, Japan

Coordinates: 35°45′43.93″N 139°49′29.63″E

JL19 Ayase Station 綾瀬駅

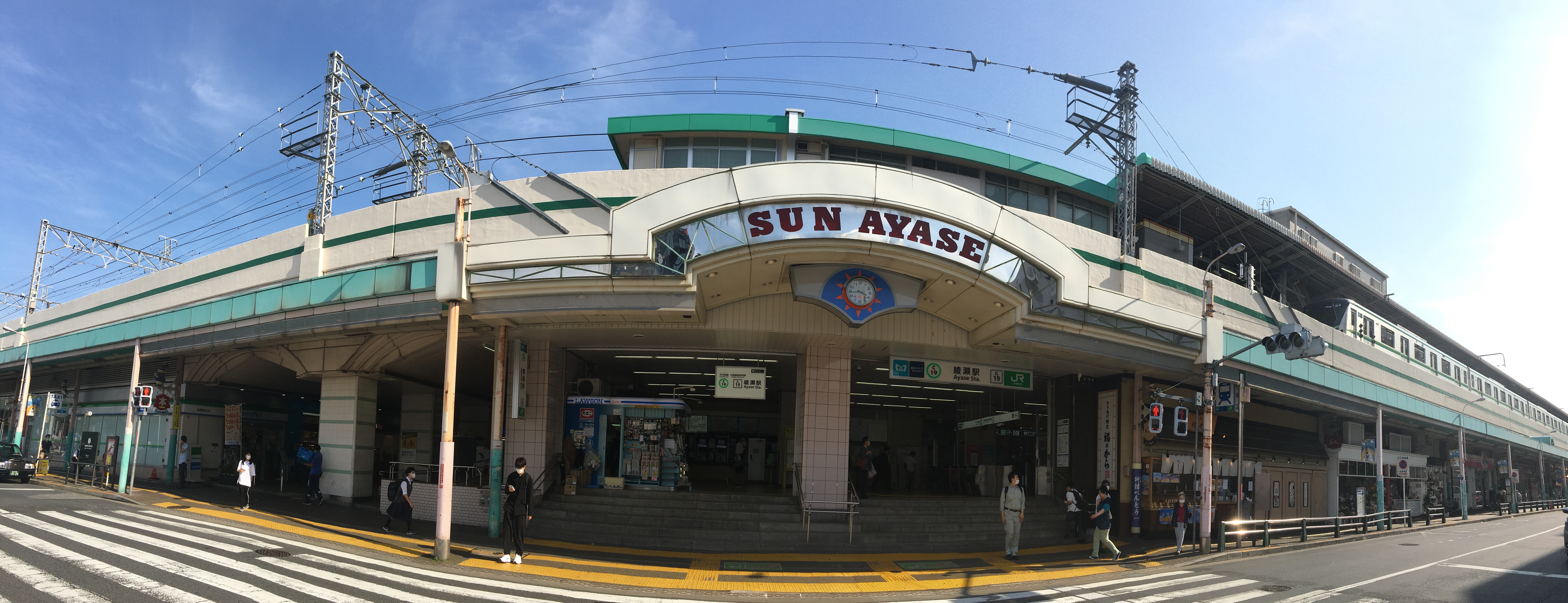
- The east entrance in June 2020

Japanese name
- Shinjitai: 綾瀬駅
- Kyūjitai: 綾瀨驛
- Hiragana: あやせえき

General information
- Location: 3 Ayase, Adachi-ku, Tokyo; Japan
- Operator: JR East; Tokyo Metro (manager)
- Lines: Jōban Line (Local); Chiyoda Line
- Platforms: 5 (2 island platforms, 1 side platform)
- Tracks: 4

Construction
- Structure type: Elevated
- Accessible: Yes

Other information
- Station code: C-19 (Tokyo Metro); JL-19 (JR East)

History
- Opened: April 1, 1943; 83 years ago

Passengers
- FY2015: 440,825 daily

Services
Preceding station	JR East	Following station
through to Chiyoda Line	Jōban Line (Local) Local-Kankō	Kameari JL20 towards Toride
Preceding station	Tokyo Metro	Following station
Kita-Senju towards Yoyogi-Uehara	Chiyoda Line	through to Joban Line
Kita-Senju towards Yoyogi-Uehara	Chiyoda Line	Kita-Ayase Terminus
Location
- Location within Special wards of Tokyo Location within Tokyo Bay and Bōsō Peninsula Location within Tokyo Location within Japan

Ayase Station (綾瀬駅, Ayase-eki) is a railway station in Adachi, Tokyo, Japan, operated by East Japan Railway Company (JR East) and the Tokyo subway operator Tokyo Metro.

== Lines ==
Ayase Station is served by the following two lines.

- JR East Joban Line
- Tokyo Metro Chiyoda Line

The official boundary between the Joban Line and Chiyoda Line is located east of Ayase Station, past the turnoff for the Kita-Ayase branch of the Chiyoda Line. However, the segment of the Chiyoda Line between Ayase and Kita-Senju Station is treated as part of the Joban Line for fare calculation purposes when passengers do not travel on Tokyo Metro beyond Kita-Senju.

Ayase Station also serves as a turnaround point for the Odakyu 60000 series MSE Romancecar service through the Chiyoda Line, and is sometimes used as a delivery point for Tokyo Metro trainsets by rail; JR Freight transports the trainsets to Ayase during midnight hours, where Tokyo Metro takes delivery and hauls them to the nearby Ayase depot.

== Station layout ==
The stations has a side platform serving one track and two island platforms serving three tracks, and a rectangular cut out for Kita Ayase trains on a fourth track. It is the only station in the Tokyo Metro network to have a "Platform 0".

=== Platforms ===
0	Chiyoda Line (Kita-ayase Branch Line)	for Kita-ayase
1-2	Chiyoda Line	for Kita-senju, Otemachi, and Yoyogi-uehara; Odakyu Odawara Line for Hon-Atsugi and Isehara
3-4	Jōban Line (Local)	for Matsudo, Abiko, and Toride (Some Chiyoda Line 10-car trains continue to Kita-ayase from this platform)

Platform 2/3 is used for terminating and starting trains. Platform 0 is exclusively used for 3-car trains.

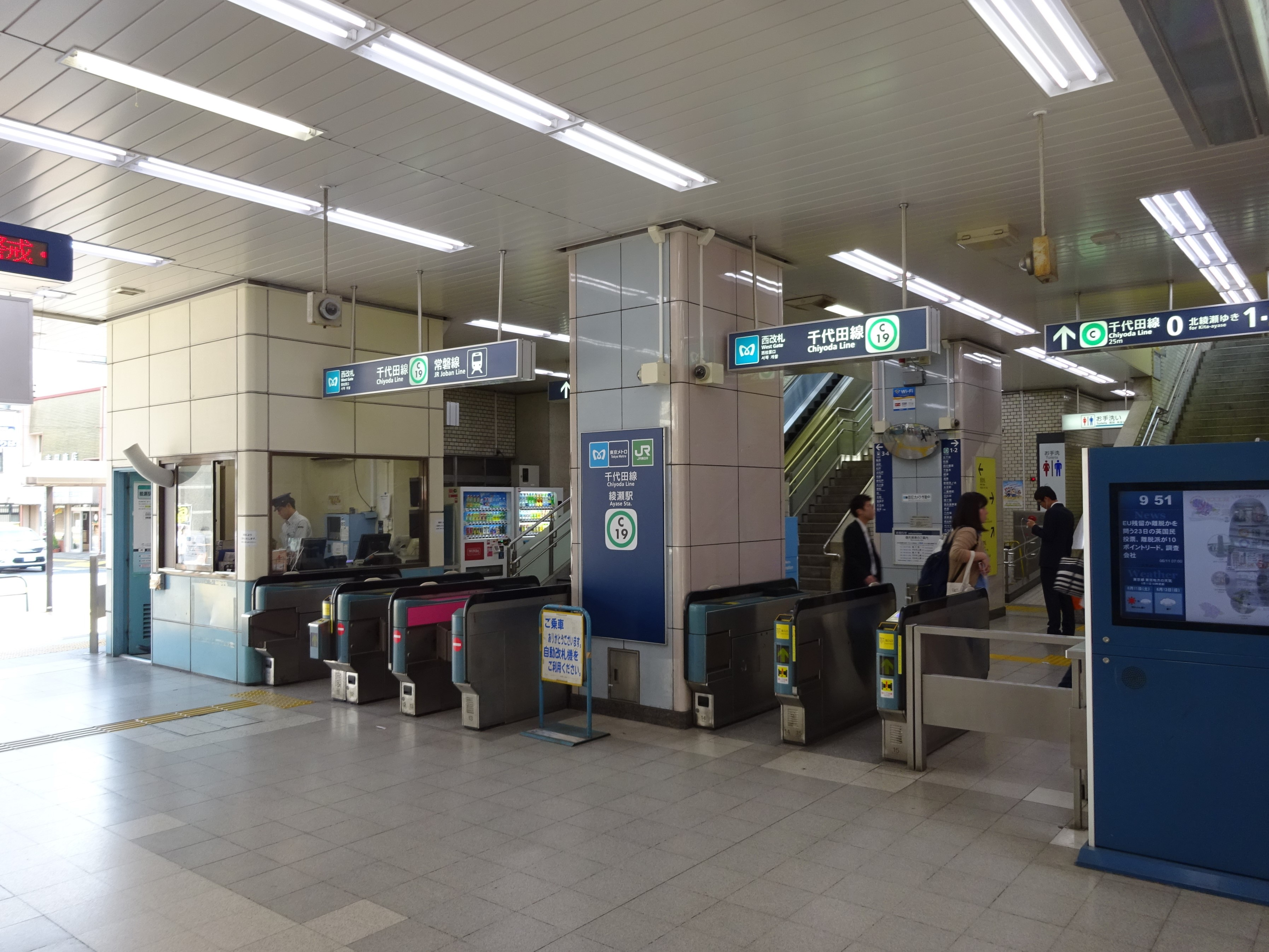
The west entrance ticket barriers in June 2016

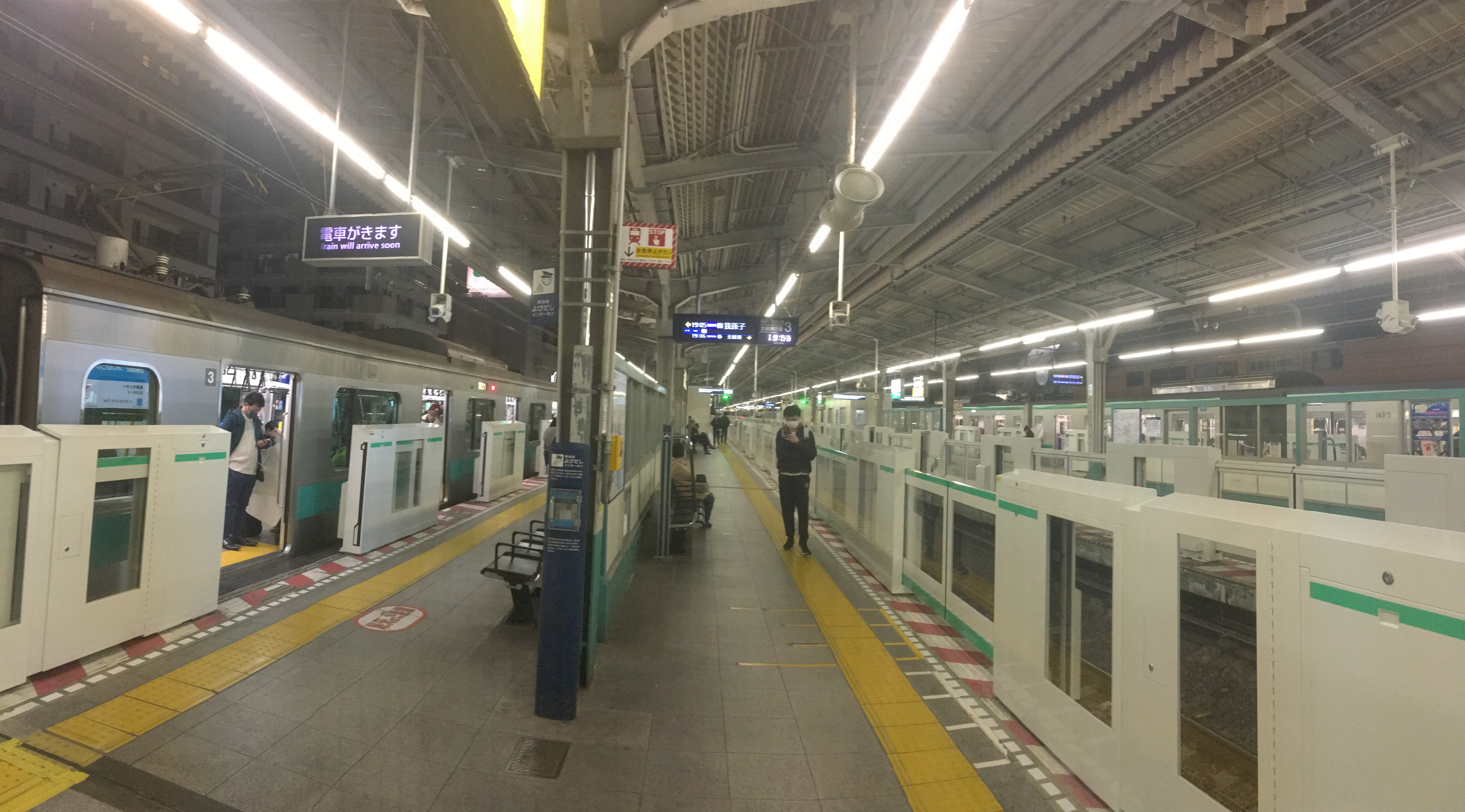
The platforms in March 2020

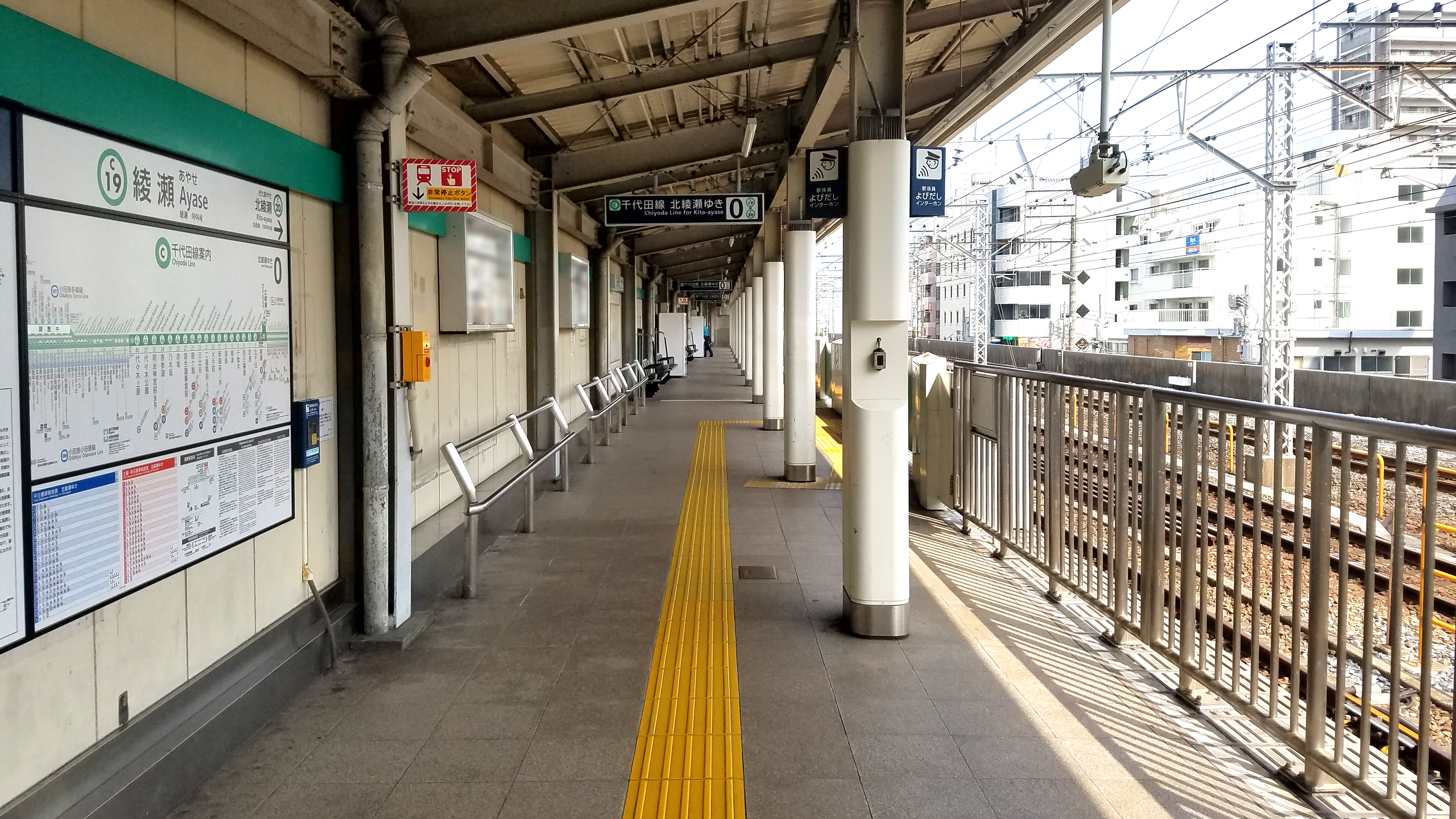
Platform 0 for Kita-ayase-bound trains, 2020

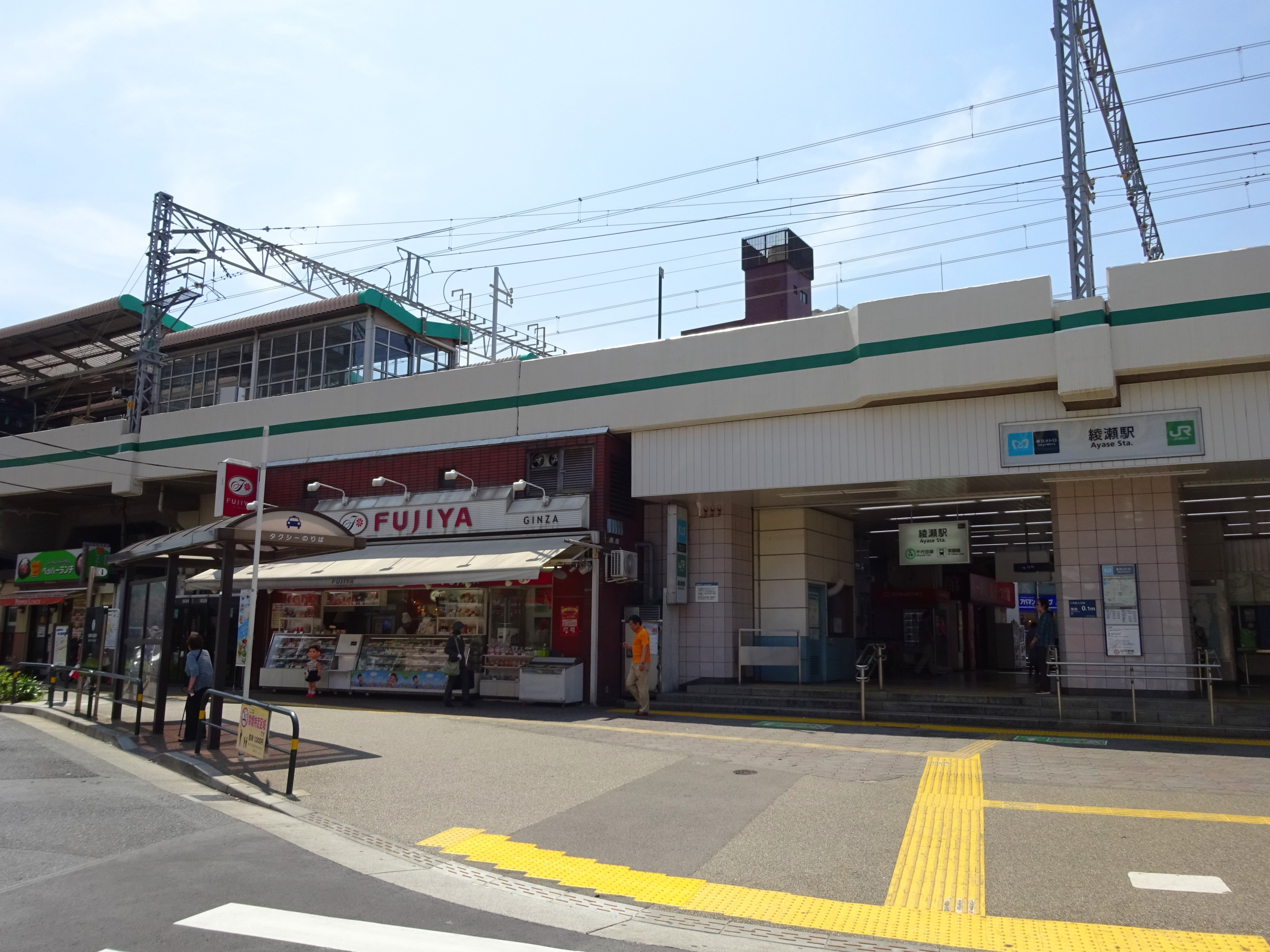
West exit, 2016

== History ==
- April 1, 1943: Ayase Station opened as a station on the Japanese Government Railways (JGR) (later Japanese National Railways) Joban Line.
- April 20, 1971: The Teito Rapid Transit Authority (TRTA) Chiyoda Line started operation and replaced Joban Line local service between Kita-Senju and Ayase. TRTA assumed management of the station from JNR.
- December 20, 1979: The Kita-Ayase Branch Line opened.
- April 1, 2004: TRTA was privatized as Tokyo Metro.

== Passenger statistics ==
In fiscal 2015, the station was used by an average of 440,825 passengers daily (combined Tokyo Metro and JR East passengers). The passenger figures for previous years are as shown below.

Fiscal year	Daily average
2010	446,839
2011	433,614
2012	435,540
2013	435,564
2014	436,961
2015	440,825

== Surrounding area ==
- Tokyo Detention House
- Tokyo Kohoku High School
- Higashi-Ayase Junior High School
- Ayase Elementary School
- Ayase River
- Higashi Ayase park

== See also ==
- List of railway stations in Japan
