= Saitama (city) =

Saitama さいたま市
- Prefecture capital and Designated city
- Saitama City
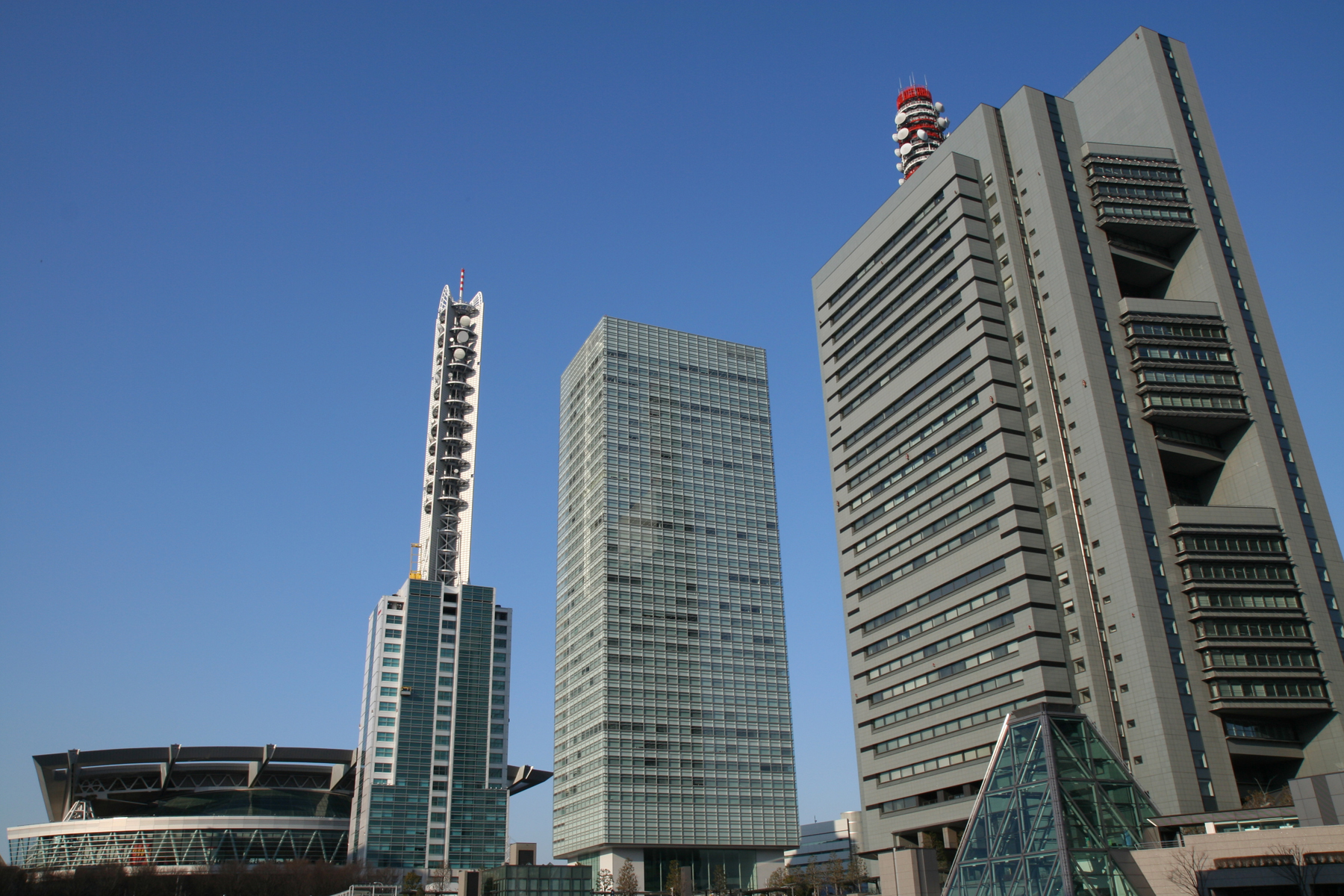
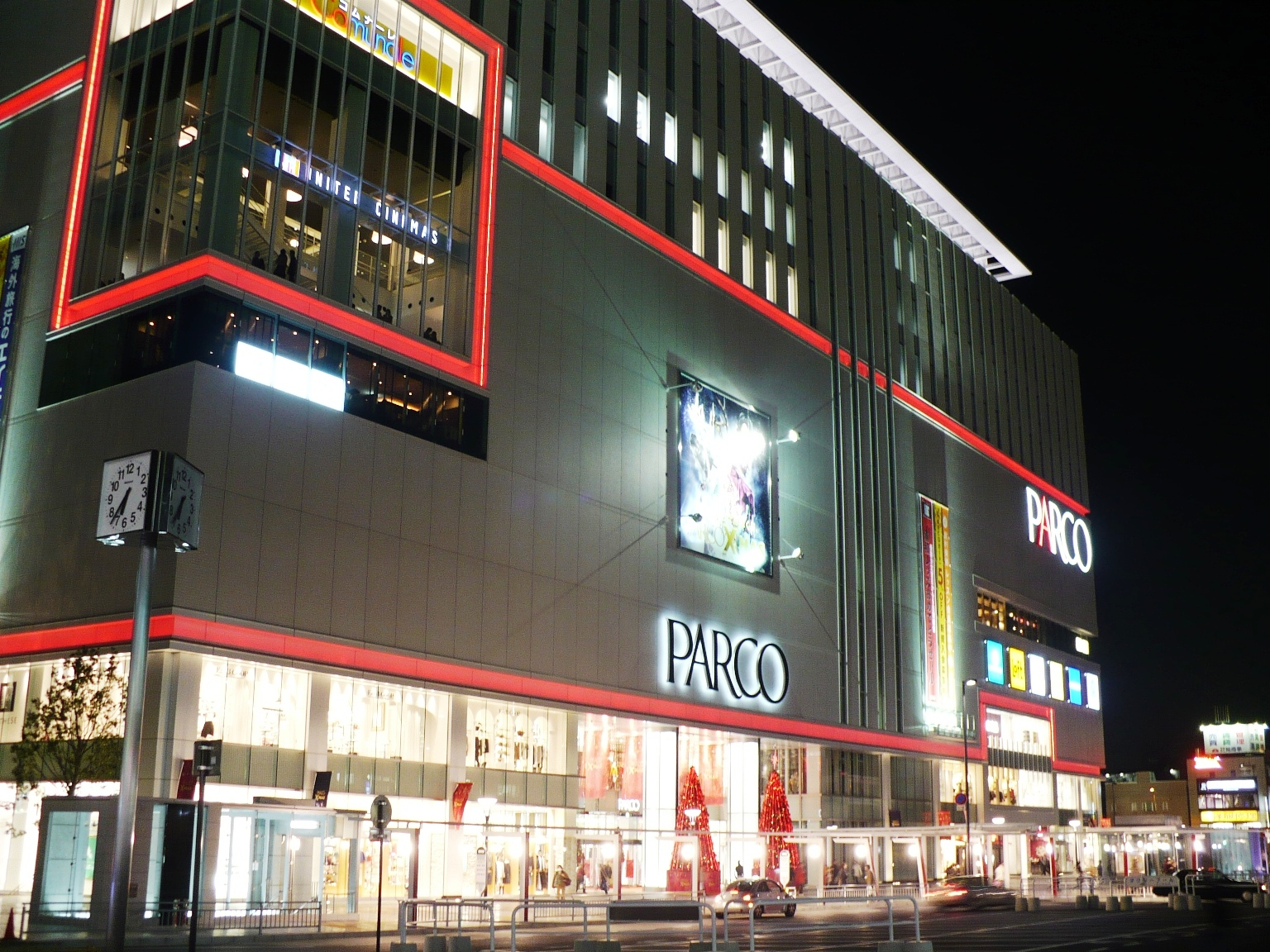
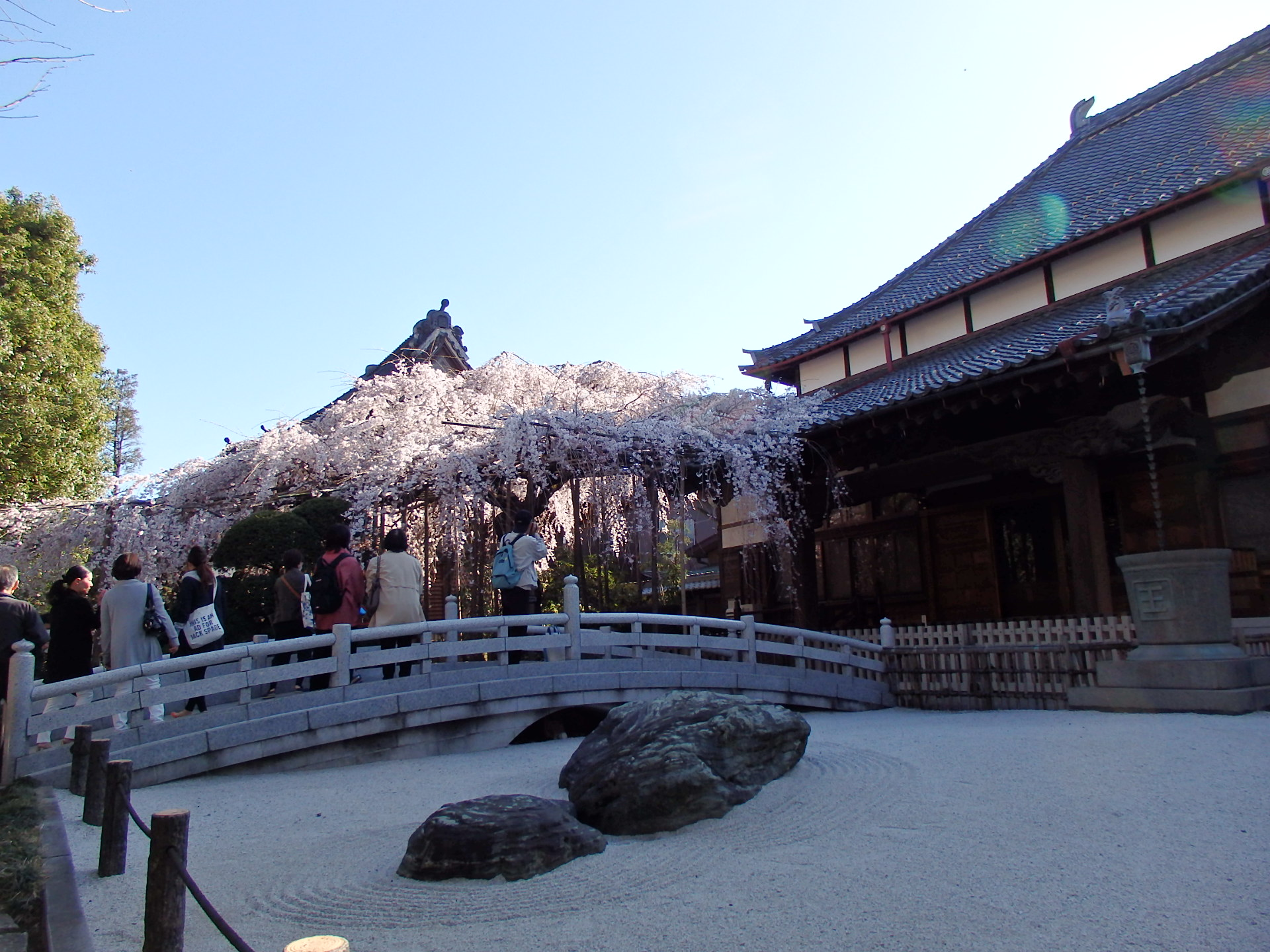
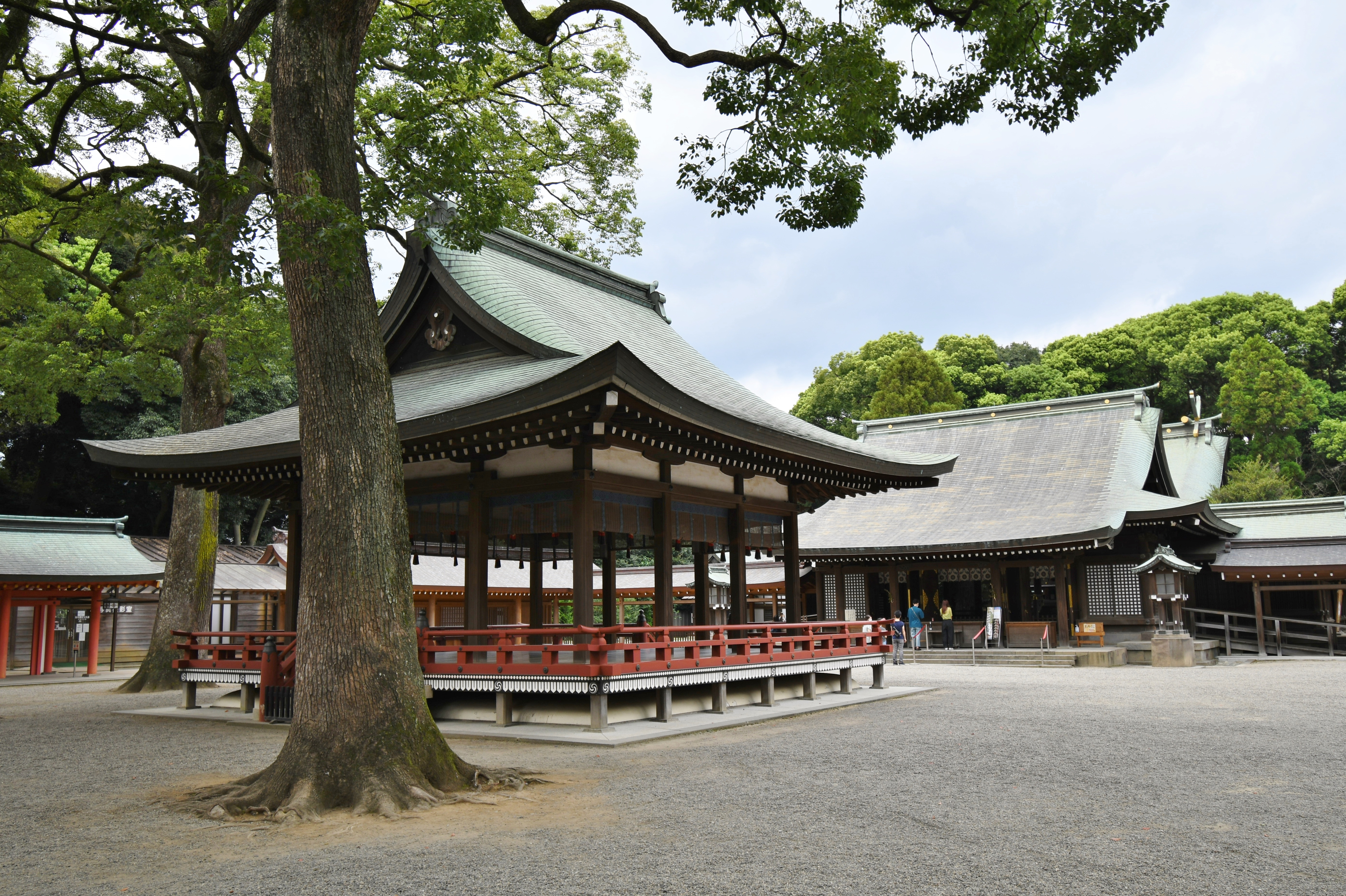
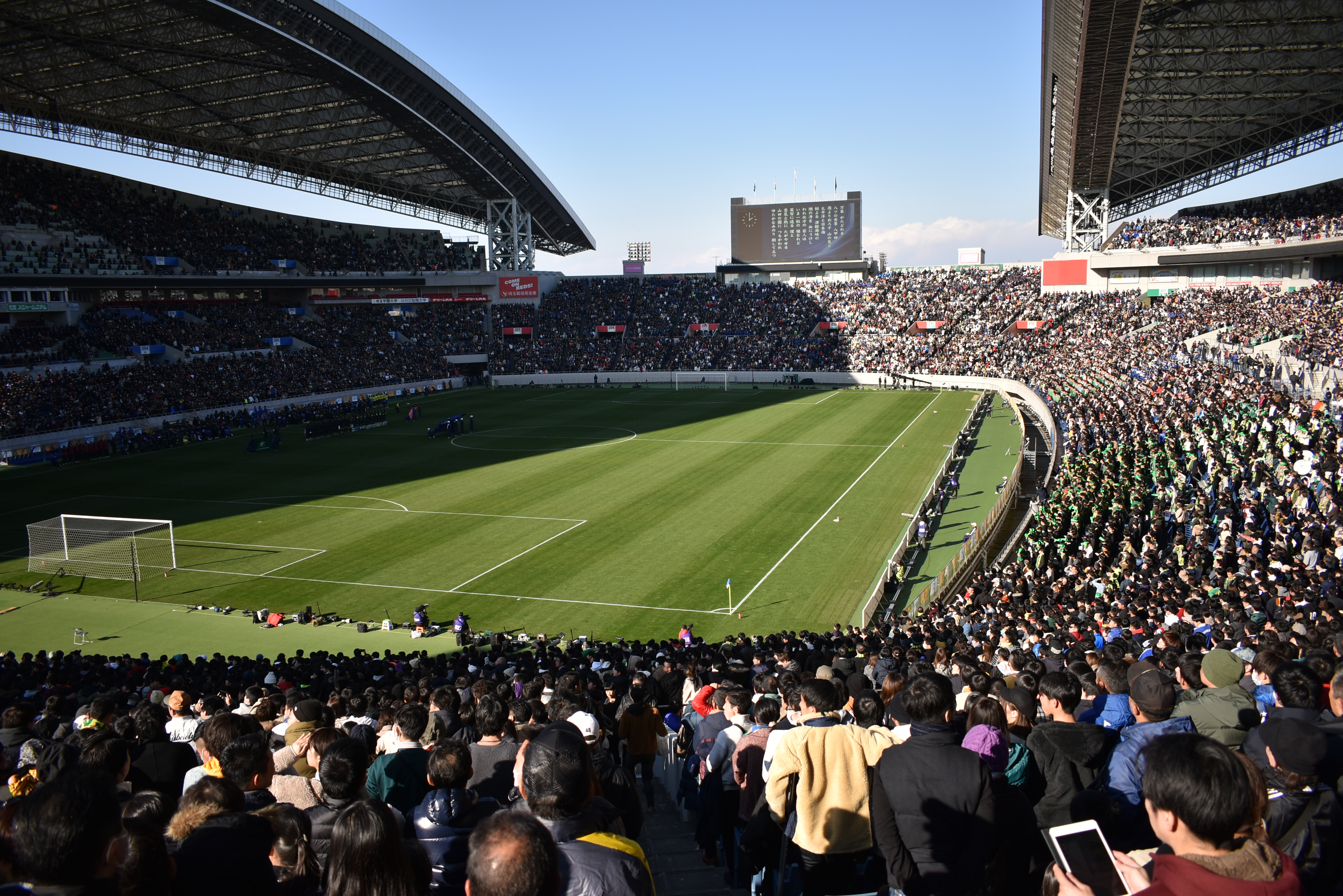
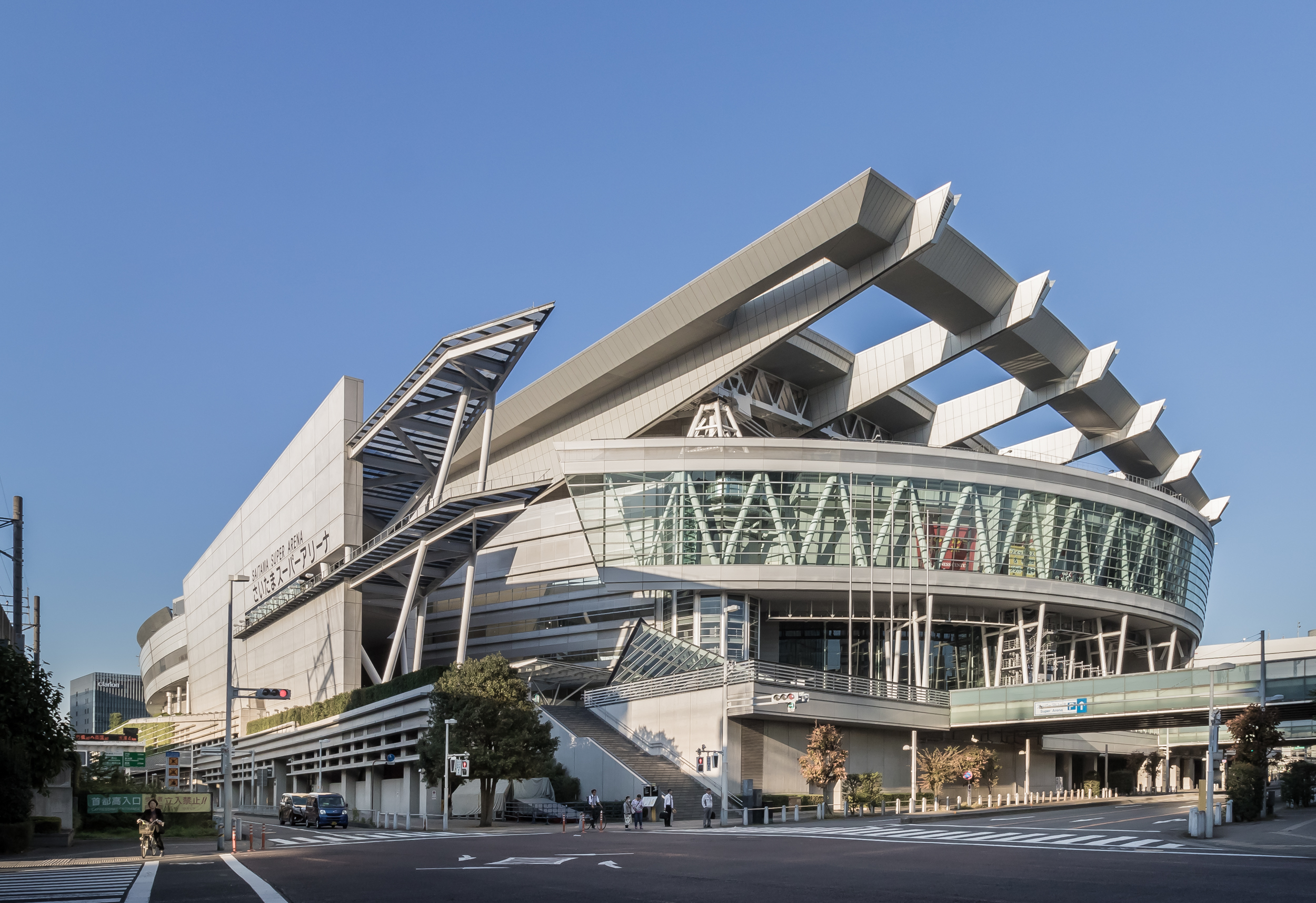
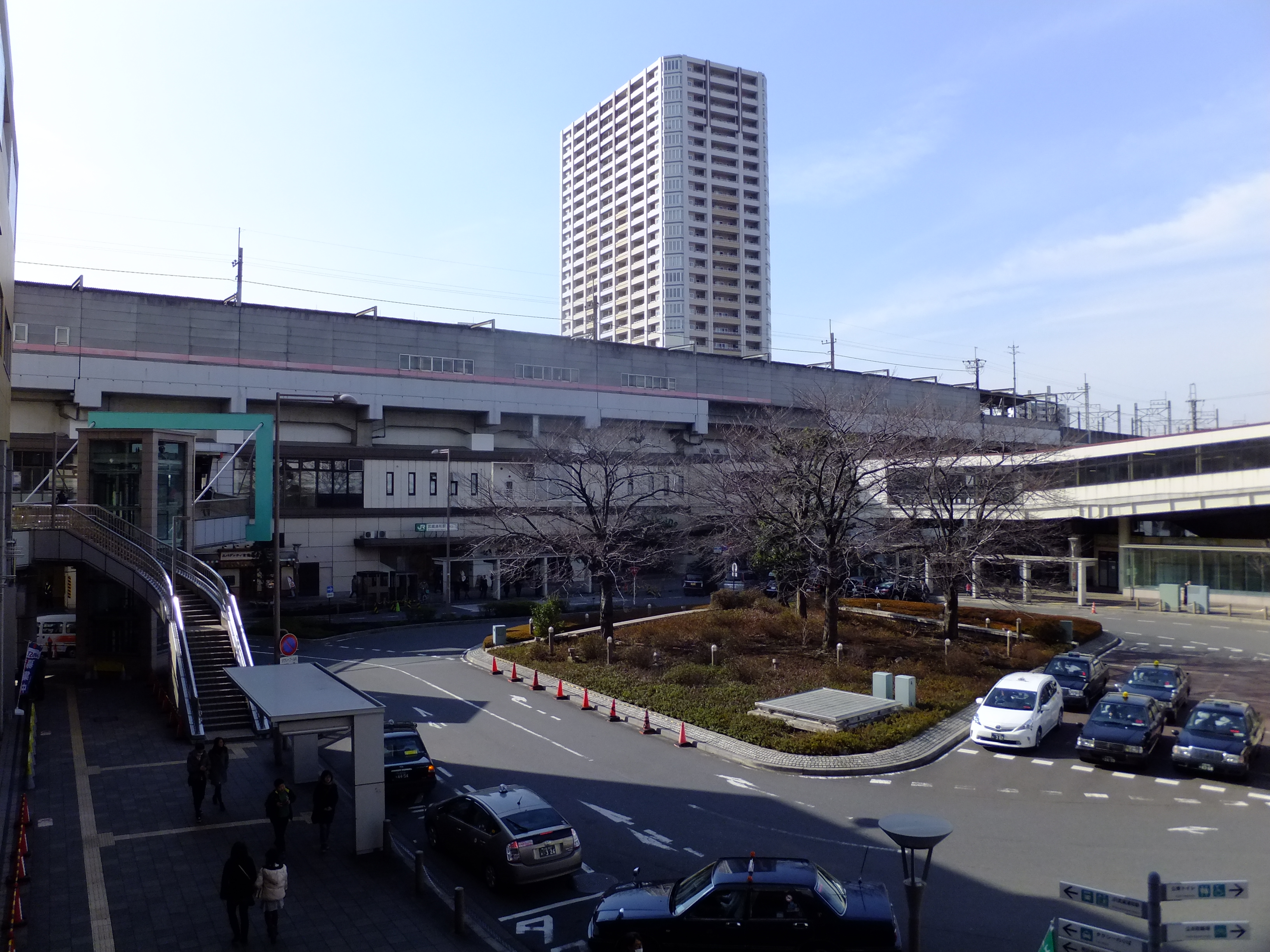
- Saitama New Urban Center Urawa Parco Gyokuzouin Hikawa Shrine Saitama Stadium 2002 Saitama Super Arena Musashi-Urawa Station

- Flag Seal

- Location of Saitama in Saitama Prefecture

- Location within Japan
- Coordinates: 35°51′41″N 139°38′44″E
- Country: Japan
- Region: Kantō
- Prefecture: Saitama
- Established: 1 May 2001

Government
  - Mayor: Hayato Shimizu

Area
  - Total: 217.43 km^{2} (83.95 sq mi)

Population (March 1, 2021)
  - Total: 1,324,854
  - Density: 6,093.2/km^{2} (15,781/sq mi)
- Time zone: UTC+9 (Japan Standard Time)
- Phone number: 048-829-1111
- Address: 6-4-4 Tokiwa, Urawa-ku, Saitama-shi, Saitama-ken 330-9588
- Climate: Cfa
- Website: Official website
- Symbols
- Flower: Primula sieboldii
- Tree: Zelkova serrata

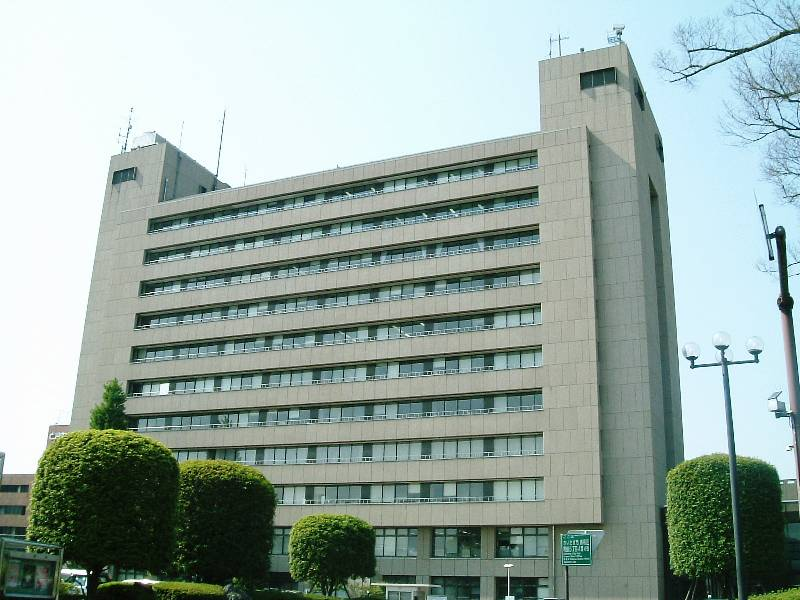
Saitama City Hall

Saitama (さいたま市, Saitama-shi; Japanese pronunciation: [sä́ì.tä̀.mä̀, sä̀í.tä́.mä́(.ɕì)]) is the capital and largest city of Saitama Prefecture, Japan. Its area incorporates the former cities of Urawa, Ōmiya, Yono and Iwatsuki. It is a city designated by government ordinance. As of 1 February 2021, the city had an estimated population of 1,324,854, and a population density of 6,093 people per km^{2} (15,781 people per sq mi). Its total area is 217.43 square kilometres (83.95 sq mi).

== Etymology ==
The name Saitama originally comes from the Sakitama District (埼玉郡) of what is now the city of Gyōda in the northern part of what is now known as Saitama Prefecture. Sakitama has an ancient history and is mentioned in the famous 8th century poetry anthology Man'yōshū. The pronunciation has changed from Sakitama to Saitama over the years.

With the 2001 merger of Urawa, Ōmiya, and Yono, it was decided that a new name, one fitting for this newly created prefectural capital, was needed. The prefectural name "Saitama" (埼玉県) was changed from kanji into hiragana, thus Saitama City (さいたま市) was born. It is the only prefectural capital in Japan whose name is always written in hiragana, and belongs to the list of hiragana cities.

However, Saitama written in hiragana (さいたま市) actually finished in second place in public polling to Saitama written in kanji (埼玉市). Despite this, government officials decided to name the new city Saitama in hiragana, not kanji. In third place in the poll was Ōmiya (大宮市). In fourth was Saitama (彩玉市), written with an alternative kanji for sai (彩) which means "colorful". The sai (埼) used in the prefectural name is a rare form of a common character (崎) that means "cape" or "promontory".

== Geography ==
The city is located 20 to 30 km north of central Tokyo, roughly at the center of the Kantō Plain. Situated in the southeast of Saitama Prefecture, the city is topographically comprised by lowlands and plateaus, at mostly less than 20 m above sea level, with no mountain ranges or hills within the city boundaries. The western portion of the city lies on the lowland created by the Arakawa River along with those created by small rivers such as the Moto-Arakawa River, Shiba River, and Ayase River. The rest of the area mostly resides on the Ōmiya Plateau lying in the north-south direction. Dispersed in this region, major rivers flow southward, almost paralleling to one another.

=== Surrounding municipalities ===
- Saitama Prefecture
  - Ageo
  - Asaka
  - Fujimi
  - Hasuda
  - Kasukabe
  - Kawagoe
  - Kawaguchi
  - Koshigaya
  - Shiki
  - Shiraoka
  - Toda
  - Warabi

=== Climate ===
Saitama has a humid subtropical climate (Köppen Cfa) characterized by warm summers and cool winters with light to no snowfall. The average annual temperature in Saitama is 15.2 °C (59.4 °F). The average annual rainfall is 1,371.3 mm (53.99 in) with September as the wettest month. The temperatures are highest on average in August, at around 27.0 °C (80.6 °F), and lowest in January, at around 3.9 °C (39.0 °F).

Climate data for Saitama (1991−2020 normals, extremes 1976−present)
Month	Jan	Feb	Mar	Apr	May	Jun	Jul	Aug	Sep	Oct	Nov	Dec	Year
Record high °C (°F)	18.7 (65.7)	25.5 (77.9)	26.9 (80.4)	31.2 (88.2)	34.2 (93.6)	38.0 (100.4)	39.3 (102.7)	38.7 (101.7)	37.4 (99.3)	33.1 (91.6)	26.0 (78.8)	25.1 (77.2)	39.3 (102.7)
Mean daily maximum °C (°F)	9.4 (48.9)	10.3 (50.5)	13.7 (56.7)	19.2 (66.6)	23.8 (74.8)	26.5 (79.7)	30.5 (86.9)	31.8 (89.2)	27.7 (81.9)	21.9 (71.4)	16.5 (61.7)	11.7 (53.1)	20.3 (68.5)
Daily mean °C (°F)	3.9 (39.0)	4.9 (40.8)	8.4 (47.1)	13.7 (56.7)	18.6 (65.5)	22.0 (71.6)	25.9 (78.6)	27.0 (80.6)	23.2 (73.8)	17.5 (63.5)	11.4 (52.5)	6.2 (43.2)	15.2 (59.4)
Mean daily minimum °C (°F)	−1.1 (30.0)	−0.2 (31.6)	3.3 (37.9)	8.4 (47.1)	13.9 (57.0)	18.3 (64.9)	22.2 (72.0)	23.2 (73.8)	19.5 (67.1)	13.5 (56.3)	6.8 (44.2)	1.2 (34.2)	10.8 (51.4)
Record low °C (°F)	−9.8 (14.4)	−8.8 (16.2)	−5.0 (23.0)	−2.0 (28.4)	4.8 (40.6)	11.5 (52.7)	14.7 (58.5)	16.3 (61.3)	9.5 (49.1)	3.6 (38.5)	−2.4 (27.7)	−6.7 (19.9)	−9.8 (14.4)
Average precipitation mm (inches)	42.4 (1.67)	39.6 (1.56)	88.0 (3.46)	101.9 (4.01)	121.4 (4.78)	144.8 (5.70)	148.0 (5.83)	164.0 (6.46)	202.8 (7.98)	196.8 (7.75)	70.9 (2.79)	45.2 (1.78)	1,371.3 (53.99)
Average precipitation days (≥ 1.0 mm)	3.8	4.6	8.7	9.0	10.0	11.6	11.8	8.8	10.8	10.0	6.7	4.4	100.8
Average dew point °C (°F)	−5 (23)	−4 (25)	1 (34)	8 (46)	13 (55)	18 (64)	22 (72)	23 (73)	19 (66)	12 (54)	6 (43)	−1 (30)	9 (49)
Mean monthly sunshine hours	201.4	186.4	186.6	187.1	185.3	128.4	152.5	181.9	135.6	135.1	156.6	181.1	2,018
Source 1: Japan Meteorological Agency
Source 2: Time and Date (dewpoints, 1985-2015)

See or edit raw graph data.

== Demographics ==
Per Japanese census data, the population of Saitama has increased steadily over the past century.

Historical population

Year	Pop.	±%
1920	123,655	—
1925	140,357	+13.5%
1930	158,304	+12.8%
1935	178,012	+12.4%
1940	202,689	+13.9%
1945	257,368	+27.0%
1950	320,453	+24.5%
1955	364,088	+13.6%
1960	420,442	+15.5%
1965	530,675	+26.2%
1970	657,425	+23.9%

Year	Pop.	±%
1975	817,712	+24.4%
1980	879,291	+7.5%
1985	922,757	+4.9%
1990	1,007,569	+9.2%
1995	1,078,545	+7.0%
2000	1,133,300	+5.1%
2005	1,176,314	+3.8%
2010	1,222,434	+3.9%
2015	1,263,979	+3.4%
2020	1,324,025	+4.8%

== Wards ==
Saitama has ten wards (ku), which were assigned official colors as of April 2005:

Wards of Saitama
	Place name				Map of Saitama
	Rōmaji	Kanji	Color	Area (km2)	
1	Chūō-ku	中央区	■ (rose red)	8.39	A map of Saitama's Wards
2	Iwatsuki-ku	岩槻区	■ (ochre)	49.17	A map of Saitama's Wards
3	Kita-ku	北区	■ (dark green)	16.86	A map of Saitama's Wards
4	Midori-ku	緑区	■ (green)	26.44	A map of Saitama's Wards
5	Minami-ku	南区	■ (lemon yellow)	13.82	A map of Saitama's Wards
6	Minuma-ku	見沼区	■ (sky blue)	30.69	A map of Saitama's Wards
7	Nishi-ku	西区	■ (blue)	29.12	A map of Saitama's Wards
8	Ōmiya-ku	大宮区	■ (orange)	12.80	A map of Saitama's Wards
9	Sakura-ku	桜区	■ (cherry blossom pink)	18.64	A map of Saitama's Wards
10	Urawa-ku	浦和区	■ (red) - administrative center	11.51	A map of Saitama's Wards

== History ==
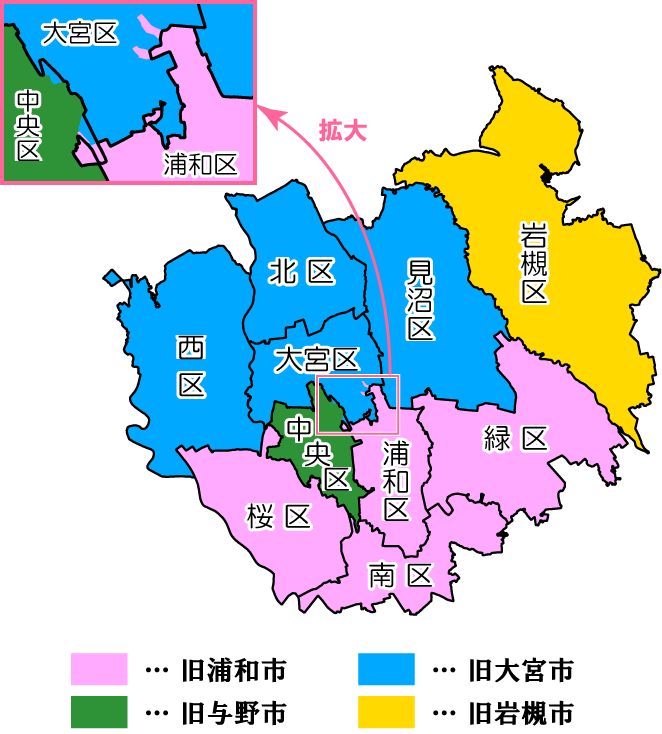
Pink: former Urawa Blue: former Ōmiya Green: former Yono Yellow: former Iwatsuki

The city was founded on May 1, 2001, and was designated on April 1, 2003 as a government ordinance. For the histories of Urawa, Ōmiya and Yono before the merger, see:

- Urawa-ku, Saitama
- Ōmiya-ku, Saitama and
- Yono, Saitama, respectively.

On April 1, 2005, Saitama absorbed the city of Iwatsuki to its east, which became a new ward, Iwatsuki-ku. The city evaded the major impact of the 2011 Tōhoku earthquake and tsunami.

== Government ==
Saitama has a mayor-council form of government with a directly elected mayor and a unicameral city council of 64 members. Saitama contributes 14 members to the Saitama Prefectural Assembly. In terms of national politics, the city is divided between the Saitama 1st district, Saitama 5th district and Saitama 15th districts of the lower house of the Diet of Japan.

=== Elections ===
- 2025 Saitama mayoral election

The executive mayor, who is directly elected, is Hayato Shimizu, an independent. He defeated the incumbent Sōichi Aikawa (backed by the Liberal Democratic Party and Komeito) in the 2009 Saitama mayoral election with backing by the DPJ. He has won four subsequent mayoral elections, most recently in May 2025.

== Economy ==
Saitama's economy is principally constituted by commercial business. The city is one of many commercial centers of the Greater Tokyo area and serves Saitama Prefecture, North Kanto, and northeast Honshu.

Saitama is also home to various manufacturers, exporting automotive (Honda manufactures the Honda Legend at Sayama Plant), food, optical, precision and pharmaceutical products. Calsonic Kansei, a global automotive company is headquartered in the city. Iwatsuki is famous for manufacturing of hinamatsuri dolls and ornate kabuto (samurai helmets).

== Land use ==
The political and administrative center of the city is Urawa Ward (Urawa Station area), and the economic, commercial, and transportation center is Omiya Ward (Omiya Station area). Located approximately 20 km to 35 km from central Tokyo, Saitama City is a satellite city and bed town in the Tokyo metropolitan area, with a day-night population ratio of 92.8 in 2010, which is less than 100 despites being the prefectural capital and an ordinance-designated city (the southeastern part of Saitama Prefecture).

Of the 747,000 commuters permanently residing in the city, 175,000, or 23.5%, commute to the Tokyo Special Wards area, making the city home to many so-called "Saitama Tomin". On the other hand, the former Urawa and Omiya cities were designated as core business cities in 1988, and in 2000, Saitama New Urban Center was opened and local branches of various central government offices were relocated from Tokyo. The southeastern area of Saitama Prefecture tends to be a suburb of Tokyo, and the day/night population ratio is particularly low in Minami ward and Midori ward, which are close to the center of Tokyo. In part for this reason, the southern part of the city, which is closer to Tokyo, tends to have a higher population density than the northern part. In addition, population tends to be concentrated along the Keihin Tohoku Line, Utsunomiya Line, Takasaki Line, and Saikyo Line, which directly connect to central Tokyo, and where both conditions overlap, there is a series of high population density areas of over 20,000 people/km2 from Minami ward to Urawa and Chuo ward.

Urban functions such as administration, commerce, and business are concentrated around major stations such as Urawa, Omiya, and Saitama-new urban stations, which have formed the central urban area since the time of the former Urawa and Omiya cities. The former Omiya City developed as a railroad town and commercial center, and Omiya Station in particular is one of the busiest and most prominent terminal stations in the Tokyo metropolitan area, with all Shinkansen bullet trains stopping there. The Urawa area is also known as an educational district with Saitama University and Saitama Prefectural Urawa High School, as well as an upscale residential area. The Iwatsuki Station area on the Tobu Noda Line (Tobu Urban Park Line) is also a part of the former Iwatsuki City's central urban area. The center of the former Yono City is Yono-honmachi Station

== Transportation ==
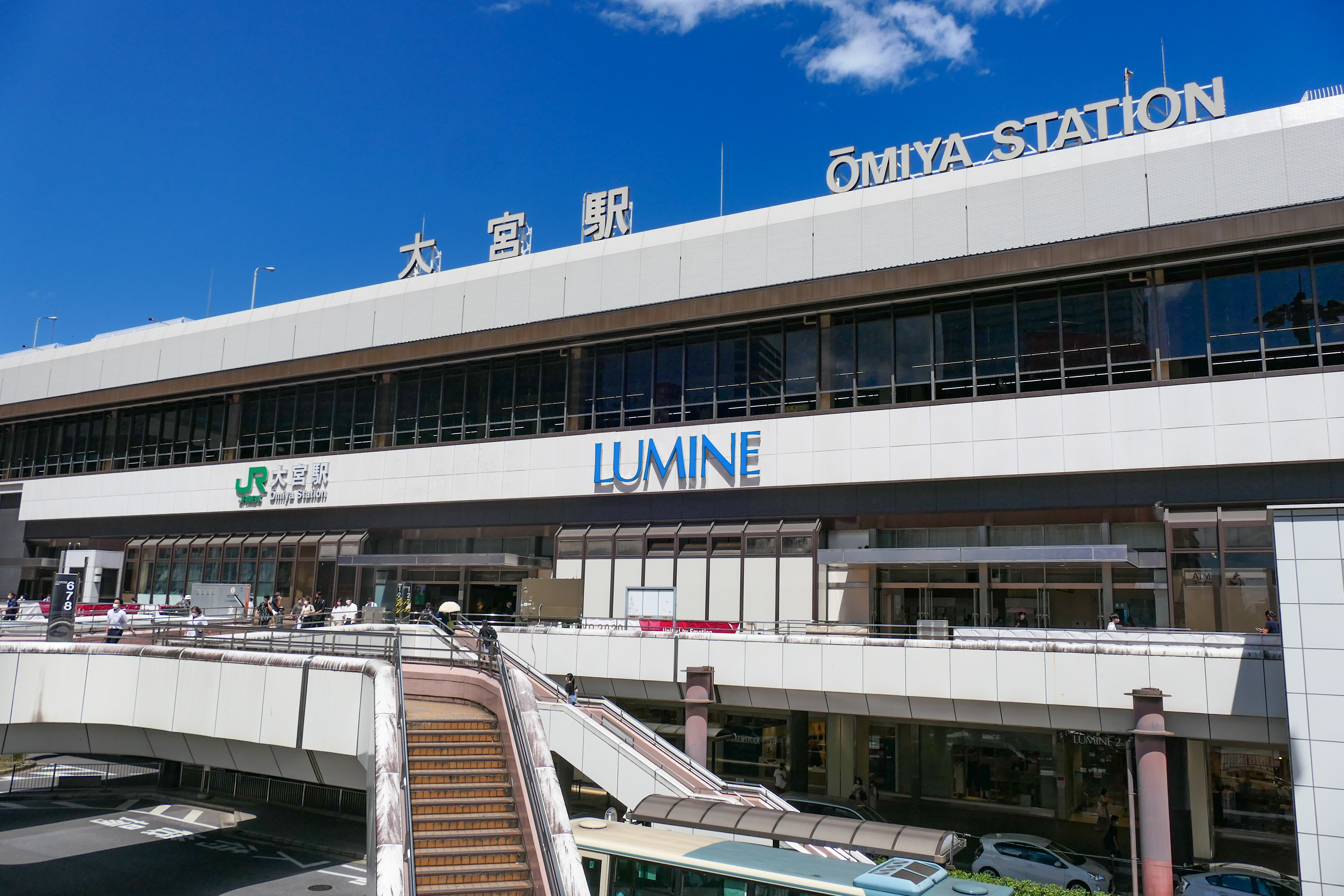
Omiya Station, a major railway hub in Saitama

Representative station is Urawa Station. Saitama is a regional transportation hub for both passengers and freight train lines. Ōmiya Station, part of the Shinkansen high-speed train network, serves as the biggest railway hub in the prefecture.

The closest major airports are Haneda Airport and Narita International Airport, both about two hours away. Honda Airport in Okegawa is for general aviation and offers no scheduled transport services. Commuter helicopter flights to Narita Airport are offered from Kawajima.

=== Railway stations ===
JR East
■ Tōhoku, Akita, Yamagata, Jōetsu and Hokuriku Shinkansen
- Ōmiya
■ Utsunomiya Line
- Urawa – Saitama-Shintoshin – Ōmiya – Toro – Higashi-Ōmiya
■ Takasaki Line
- (<<Through to the Utsunomiya Line<<) – Ōmiya – Miyahara
■ Keihin-Tōhoku Line
- Minami-Urawa – Urawa – Kita-Urawa – Yono – Saitama-Shintoshin – Ōmiya
■ Saikyō Line
- Musashi-Urawa – Naka-Urawa – Minami-Yono – Yonohommachi – Kita-Yono – Ōmiya
■ Musashino Line
- Nishi-Urawa – Musashi-Urawa – Minami-Urawa – Higashi-Urawa
■ Kawagoe Line
- Ōmiya – Nisshin – Nishi-Ōmiya – Sashiōgi
Saitama Rapid Railway Line
- Urawa Misono
Tōbu Railway – Tōbu Urban Park Line
- Ōmiya – Kita-Ōmiya – Ōmiya-kōen – Ōwada – Nanasato – Iwatsuki – Higashi-Iwatsuki
Saitama New Urban Transit ("New Shuttle") – Ina Line
- Ōmiya – Tetsudō-Hakubutsukan – Kamonomiya – Higashi-Miyahara – Konba – Yoshinohara

=== Highways ===
- Tōhoku Expressway
- Tokyo Gaikan Expressway
- Shuto Expressway Ōmiya Route
- Shuto Expressway Saitama Shintoshin Route
- National Route 16
- National Route 17
- National Route 122
- National Route 298
- National Route 463

== Culture ==
=== Education ===
==== Universities ====
- Mejiro University
- Nihon University Faculty of Law
- Nippon Institute of Technology
- The Open University of Japan Omiya Study Center
- Saitama University
- Shibaura Institute of Technology
- University of Human Arts and Sciences
- Urawa University

==== Junior colleges ====
- Kokusai Gakuin Saitama Junior College
- Urawa University Junior College

==== Professional graduate school ====
- Omiya Law School

==== High schools ====
Saitama Prefectural Board of Education operates prefectural high schools.

The following municipal high schools are operated by the city:

- Saitama Municipal Ohmiya International Secondary School
- Saitama Municipal Omiya Kita High School
- Saitama Municipal Urawa Junior and Senior High School
- Saitama Municipal Urawa Minami High School

=== Sports ===
Saitama was one of the host cities for the playoffs and the final of the official 2006 Basketball World Championship.

It is home to two J.League football teams: the Urawa Red Diamonds, formerly owned by Mitsubishi, and RB Omiya Ardija, formerly owned by NTT.

The city and Tokorozawa are home to the Japan Professional Basketball League team the Saitama Broncos.

- Urawa Red Diamonds – J.League football
- RB Omiya Ardija – J.League football
- Saitama Broncos – bj league basketball (The base is Saitama Prefecture, main is Saitama, Tokorozawa.)
- Saitama Seibu Lions – NPB (baseball)
- NJPW Dojo – NJPW (professional wrestling)

Since 2013, the city has hosted the Saitama Criterium cycling race sponsored by the Tour de France, held at the end of October.

=== Mass media ===
Most of Saitama Prefecture's mass media presence is concentrated in this city. See Mass media in Saitama Prefecture for details.

== Sister cities ==
Saitama has seven sister cities.

- Toluca, State of Mexico, Mexico, since 1979
- Zhengzhou, Henan, China, since 1981
- Hamilton, New Zealand, since 1984
- Richmond, Virginia, United States, since 1994
- Nanaimo, British Columbia, Canada, since 1996
- Pittsburgh, Pennsylvania, United States, since 1998
- Leipzig, Saxony, Germany, since 2020

== Visitor attractions ==
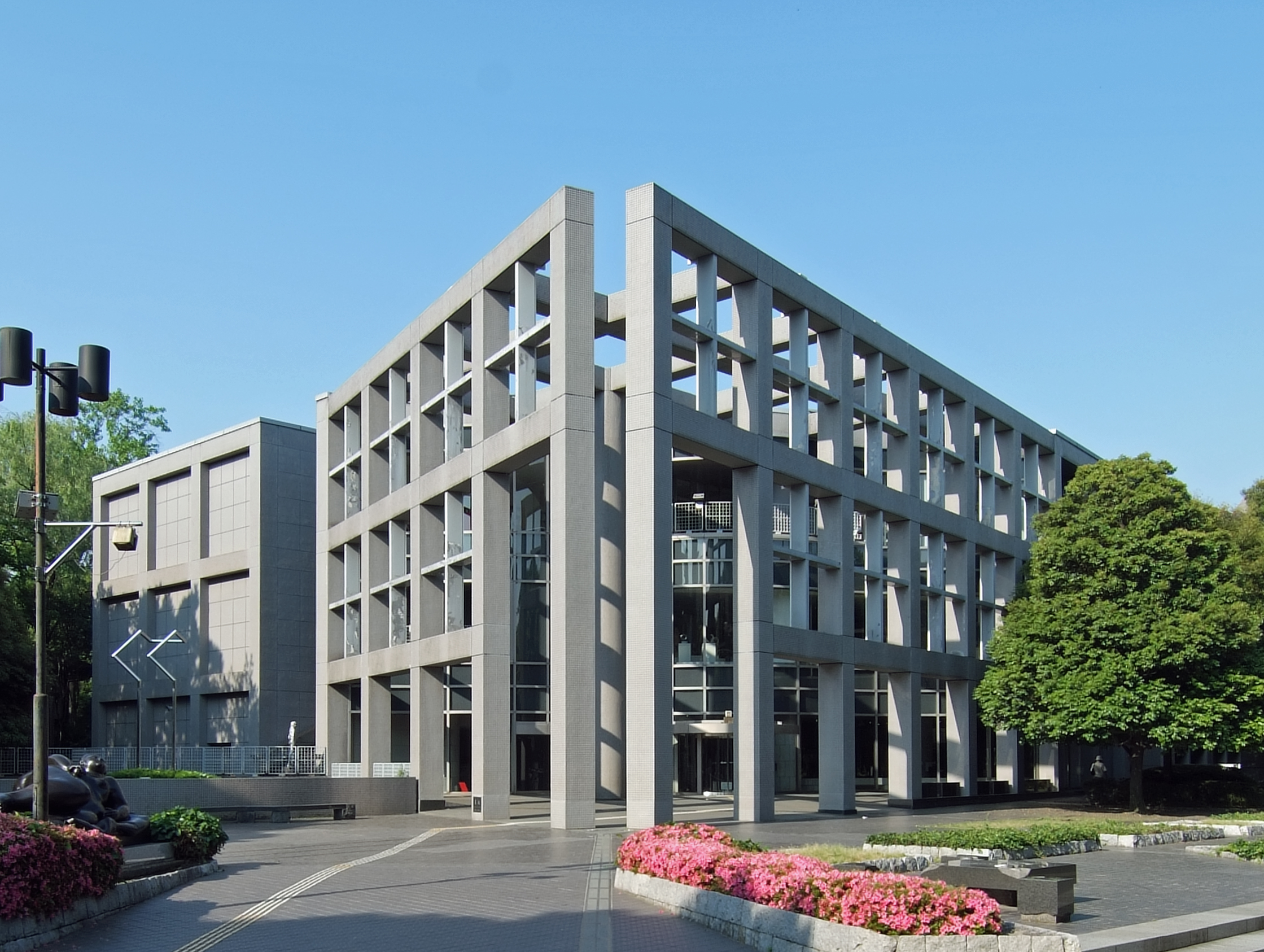
Saitama Museum of Modern Art

- Akigase Park
- Besshonuma Park
- Hikawa Shrine
- Irumagawa stable
- Minuma Rice Paddies
- Minuma Tsūsen-bori
- Ōmiya Bonsai Village
- Railway Museum
- Saitama Museum of Modern Art
- Saitama New Urban Center
- Saitama Stadium 2002
- Saitama Super Arena
