= Ōmiya-ku =

Ōmiya-ku, Saitama 大宮区
- Ward
- Ōmiya Ward
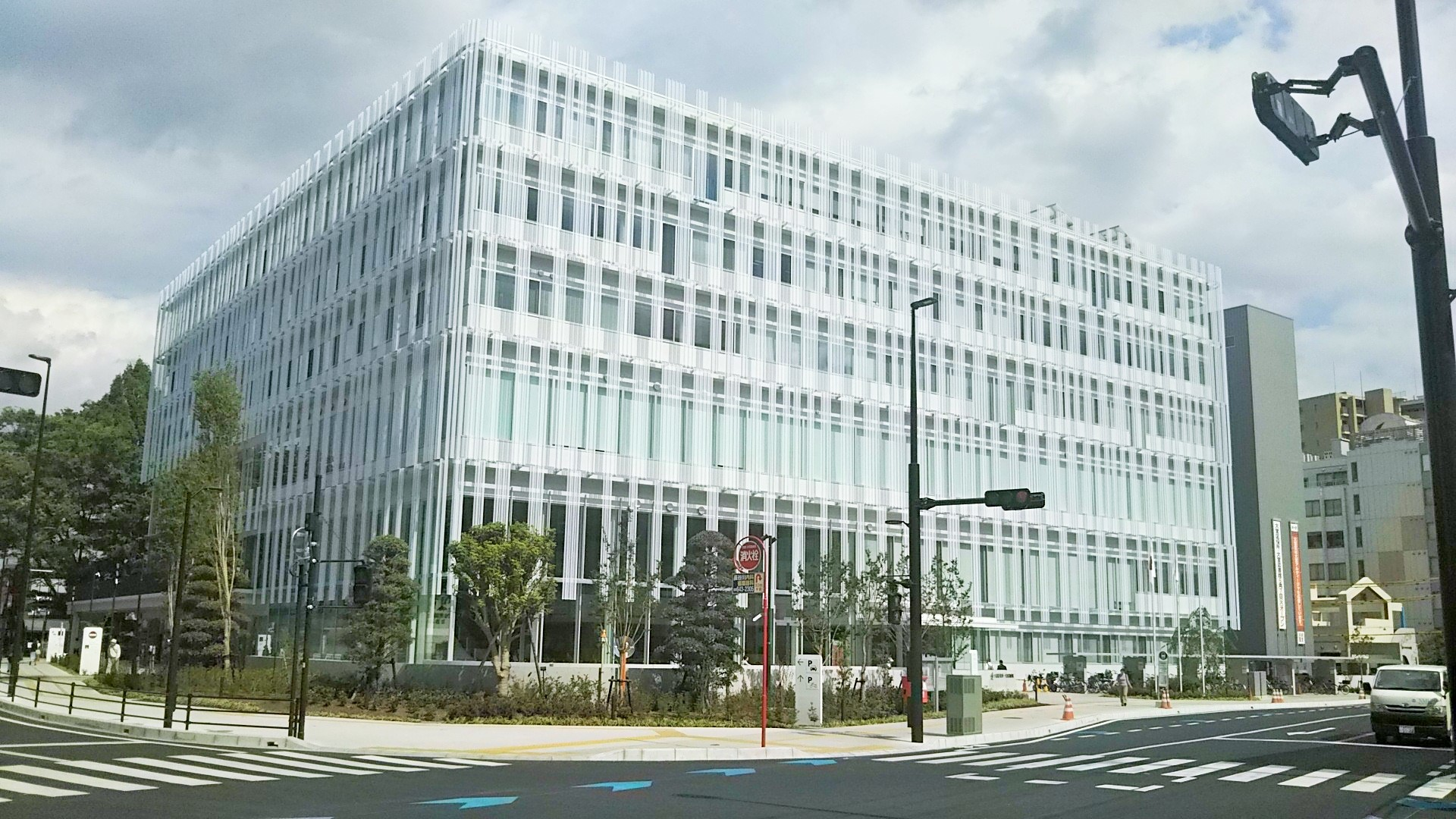
- Ōmiya Ward Office

- Seal

- Location of Ōmiya-ku in Saitama

- Location within Japan
- Coordinates: 35°54′23.2″N 139°37′43.1″E
- Country: Japan
- Region: Kantō
- Prefecture: Saitama
- City: Saitama

Area
  - Total: 12.80 km^{2} (4.94 sq mi)

Population (March 1, 2021)
  - Total: 119,298
  - Density: 9,320/km^{2} (24,140/sq mi)
- Time zone: UTC+9 (Japan Standard Time)
- -Flower: Sakura
- Phone number: 048-835-3156
- Address: 3-1 Daimon, Ōmiya-ku, Saitama-shi, Saitama-ken 330-8501
- Website: Official website

Ōmiya (大宮区, Ōmiya-ku) is one of ten wards of the city of Saitama, in Saitama Prefecture, Japan, and is located in the northeastern part of the city. As of 1 March 2021, the ward had an estimated population of 119,298 and a population density of 9,300 persons per km^{2}. Its total area was 12.80 square kilometres (4.94 sq mi). Although Urawa-ku is the governmental center of Saitama City, Ōmiya-ku is the most active commercial and business centre in both Saitama City and Saitama Prefecture thanks to its transport infrastructure, especially railways connected at Ōmiya Station.

== Geography ==
Ōmiya Ward is within the Ōmiya Terrace of the Kantō Plain, in the center of Saitama City. It is in the Greater Tokyo Area and about 25 km north of central Tokyo.

=== Neighboring Municipalities ===
Ōmiya-ku is surrounded by Nishi-ku (to the west), Kita-ku (north), Minuma-ku (east), Urawa-ku (southeast), Chūō-ku (south), and Sakura-ku (southwest).

== History ==
Ōmiya derives its name from a famous Shinto shrine, the Hikawa Shrine, which has been a place of pilgrimage since at least the Heian period. During the Edo period, the area flourished as Ōmiya-shuku, a post station on the Nakasendō highway, which connected Edo with Kyoto. Following the Meiji restoration, it became part of Urawa Prefecture which merged with Iwatsuki, Urawa, and Oshi Prefectures in 1871 to form Saitama Prefecture. The modern town of Ōmiya was officially created within Kitaadachi District, Saitama with the establishment of the municipalities system on April 1, 1889.

On November 3, 1940, Ōmiya merged with the neighboring villages of Mihashi, Osato, Miyahara and Nisshin and was elevated to city status. Ōmiya continued to expand after the end of the war, absorbing the villages of Sashiougi, Mamiya, Uemizu, Katayanagi, Haruoka, and Nanasato on January 1, 1955.

On May 1, 2001, Ōmiya merged with Urawa and Yono to form Saitama City. In April 2003 Saitama became a city designated by government ordinance, and now the area of former Ōmiya City was divided between Kita-ku (north), Minuma-ku (east), Nishi-ku (west), and Ōmiya-ku (south).

== Education ==
Tertiary:

- Kokusai Gakuin Saitama Junior College
- University of Human Arts and Sciences

Urawa-ku has nine elementary schools, seven junior high schools, and eight high schools.

Public junior high schools:

- No. 2 (Daini) Higashi (第二東中学校)
- Mihashi (三橋中学校)
- Omiya Higashi (大宮東中学校)
- Omiya Kita (大宮北中学校)
- Omiya Minami (大宮南中学校)
- Onari (大成中学校)
- Sakuragi (桜木中学校)

Municipal elementary schools:

- Kamiko (上小小学校)
- Mihashi (三橋小学校)
- Omiya (大宮小学校)
- Omiya Higashi (立大宮東小学校)
- Omiya Kita (大宮北小学校)
- Omiya Minami (大宮南小学校)
- Onari (大成小学校)
- Sakuragi (桜木小学校)
- Shibakawa (芝川小学校)

The ward also has a North Korean school, Saitama Korean Elementary and Middle School (埼玉朝鮮初中級学校). This school was previously in the City of Ōmiya.

== Transportation ==
=== Railway ===
JR East – Tohoku Shinkansen / Joetsu Shinkansen / Akita Shinkansen / Yamagata Shinkansen / Hokuriku Shinkansen / Kawagoe Line

- Ōmiya

JR East – Tohoku Main Line / Takasaki Line / Keihin Tohoku Line

- Saitama-Shintoshin - Ōmiya

Tōbu Railway – Tōbu Urban Park Line

- Ōmiya - Kita-Ōmiya - Ōmiya-kōen

Saitama New Urban Transit ("New Shuttle") - Ina Line

- Ōmiya – Tetsudō-Hakubutsukan

=== Highway ===
- Shuto Expressway Ōmiya Route
- National Route 17

== Local attractions ==
- Ōmiya Park
- Hikawa Shrine
- Railway Museum
- Saitama Red Cross Hospital in Omiya
- The bonsai nurseries in the neighbouring Kita-ku is usually referred to as the "Ōmiya Bonsai Village" because it was in the area of former Ōmiya city.

== Notable people ==
- Takushi Izawa - Japanese YouTuber and television personality
