= Omiya Law School =

Law school in Saitama Prefecture, Japan

Coordinates: 35°54′14″N 139°37′05″E

Omiya Law School (大宮法科大学院大学, Ōmiya Hōkadaigakuin Daigaku) is a graduate level law school in Saitama, Saitama Prefecture, Japan. The school closed in 2015.
