= Ōmiya Bonsai Village =

- Interactive map of Ōmiya Bonsai Village
- Type: Bonsai nursery
- Nearest city: Kita-ku, Saitama, Japan
- Coordinates: 35.927763°N 139.631513°E
- Area: 330,000 m^{2} (3,600,000 sq ft)
- Created: 1925
- Open: Daily except Thursday
- Website: omiyabonsai.jp

Ōmiya Bonsai Village (大宮盆栽村, Ōmiya Bonsai-mura) is the nickname for the bonsai nursery precinct in Bonsai-chō (盆栽町, Bonsai-chō), Kita-ku, Saitama, Japan.

Bonsai Village is located near Ōmiya-kōen Station on the Tobu Noda Line. It is closed on every Thursday (unless the Thursday falls on a national holiday).

== History ==
- 1925: Settled by a group of professional bonsai gardeners who originally lived around Dangō-Zaka (Hongō) area in Tokyo and emigrated from there due to the crucial damages caused by the Great Kantō earthquake in 1923, at Toro and Hongō settlements of Ōsato village.
- 1940 Ōsato village merged with other villages to form Ōmiya city.
- 1957 The official suburb name 盆栽町 (Bonsai-chō, lit. Bonsai Town) was given to the precinct.
- 2001 Ōmiya city merges with other cities to form Saitama City.
- 1 April 2003 on the day of the government designation of Saitama City Bonsai-chō was classified in Kita-ku.

== Today ==
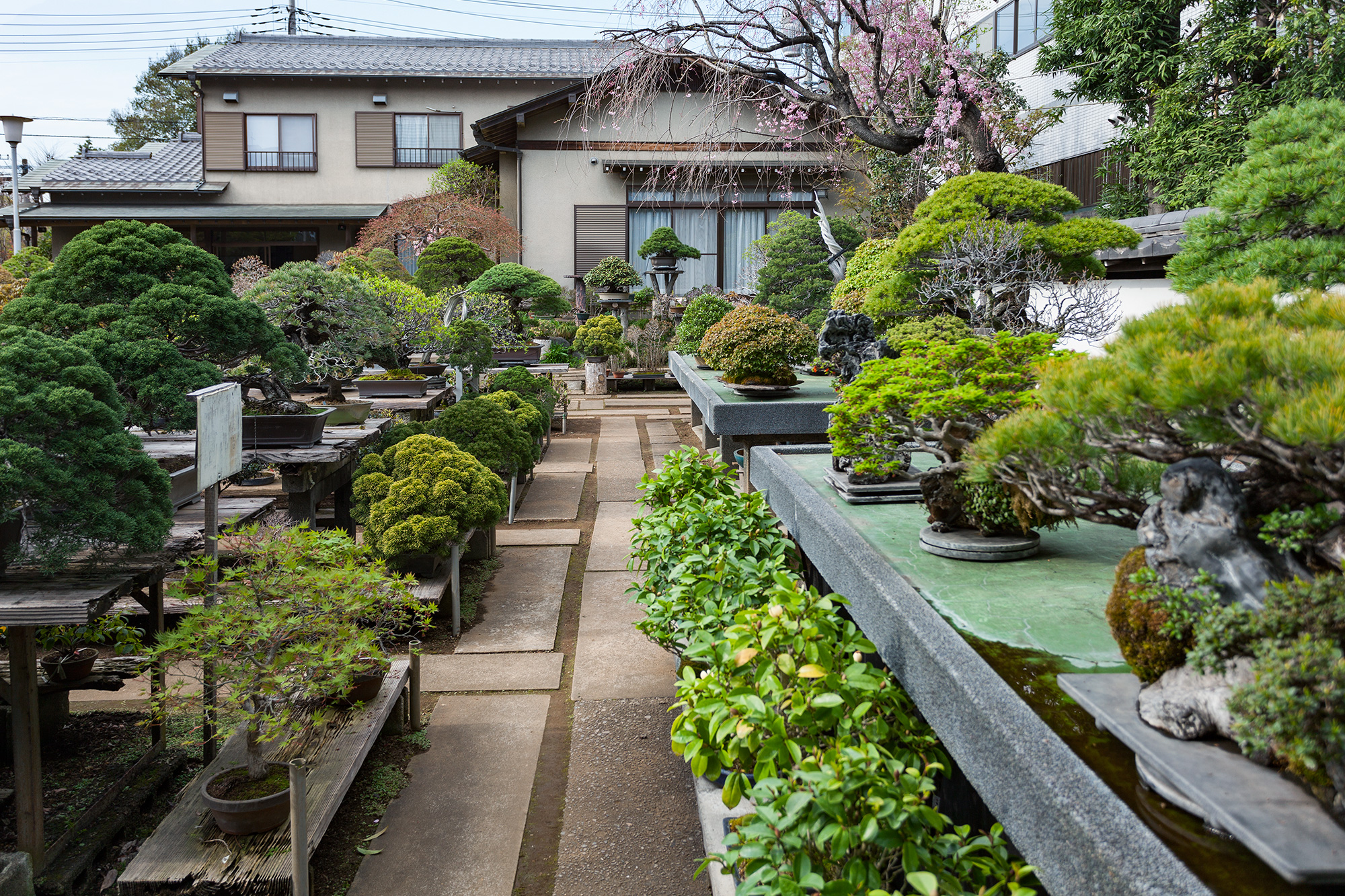
Bonsai nursery Fuyo-en in Ōmiya Bonsai Village.

The Bonsai Village consists of about ten privately owned bonsai gardens. From the early 1990s, Omiya Bonsai-cho has seen a slight contraction in the number of nurseries. As of 2007, the Bonsai Village contains hundreds of thousands of bonsai trees in a site of about 330,000 square meters.

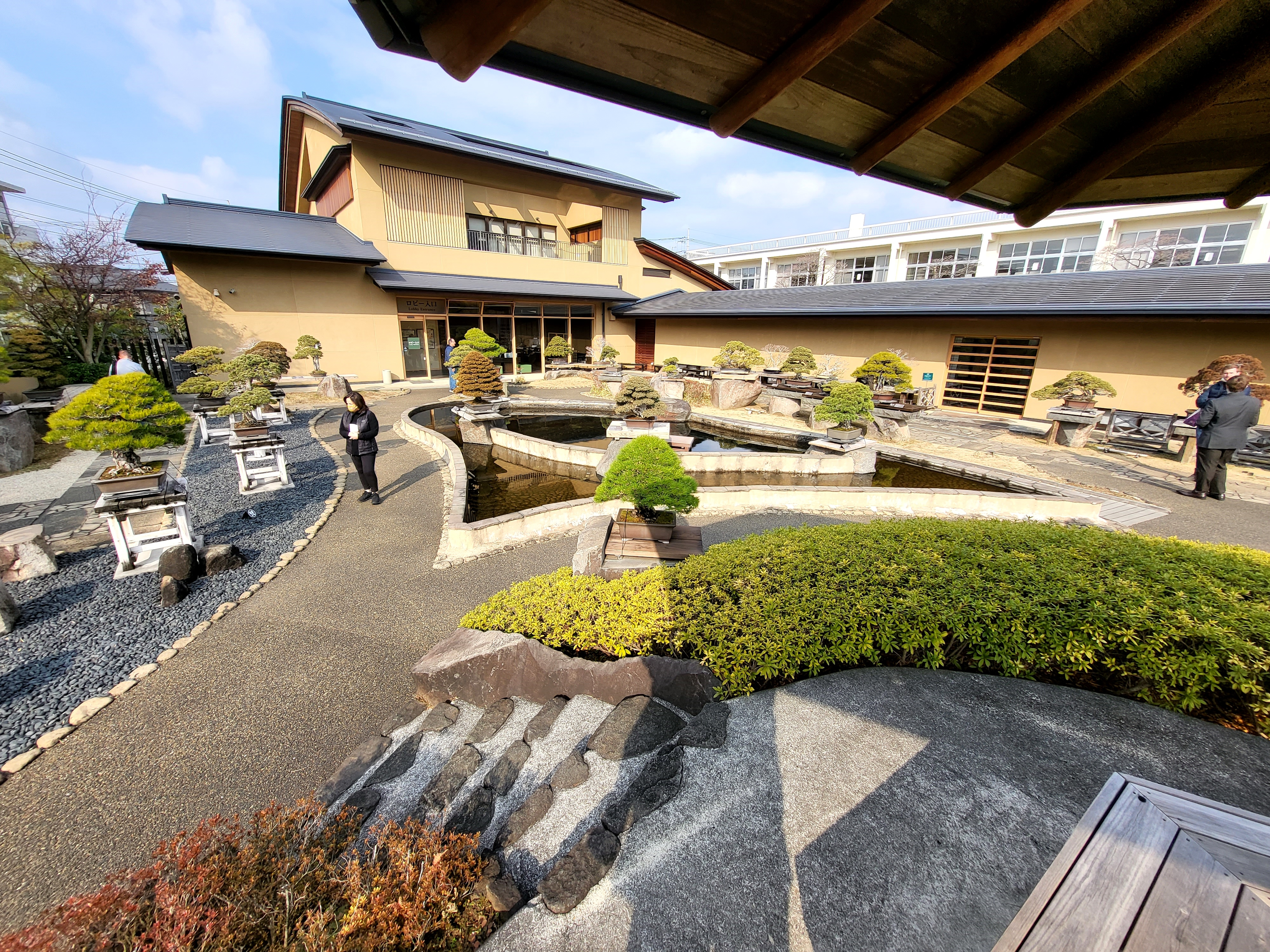
Gardens of the Omiya Bonsai Art Museum.

The area also contains the Omiya Bonsai Art Museum, opened in 2010. The museum has indoor exhibits of bonsai history and art, as well as an outdoor area with a number of bonsai specimens. Some of the museum's materials were drawn from the Takagi Bonsai Museum of Art in Tokyo.

Each year, Bonsai Village holds the "Great Bonsai Festival" from 3–5 May. During the festival the area is packed with many bonsai devotees from all over Japan.

== See also ==
- Bonsai - Japanese tradition of growing miniature trees in containers
