= Tetsudō-Hakubutsukan Station =

Railway station in Saitama, Japan

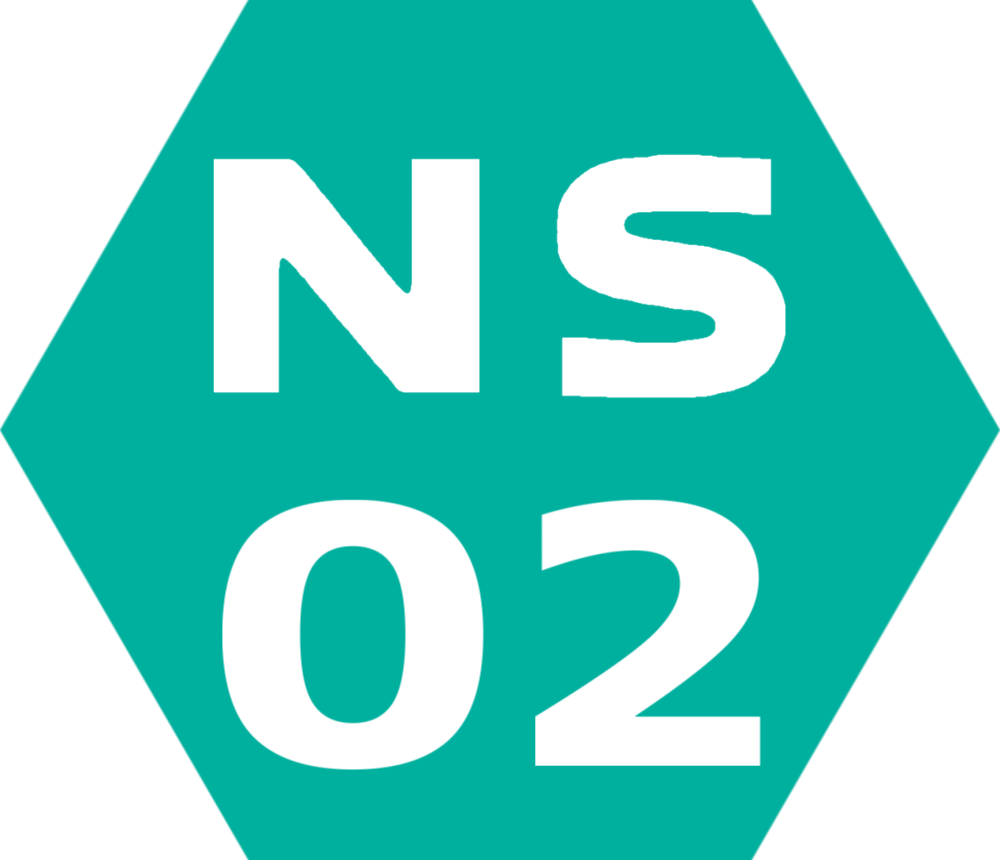
Tetsudō-Hakubutsukan Station 鉄道博物館駅

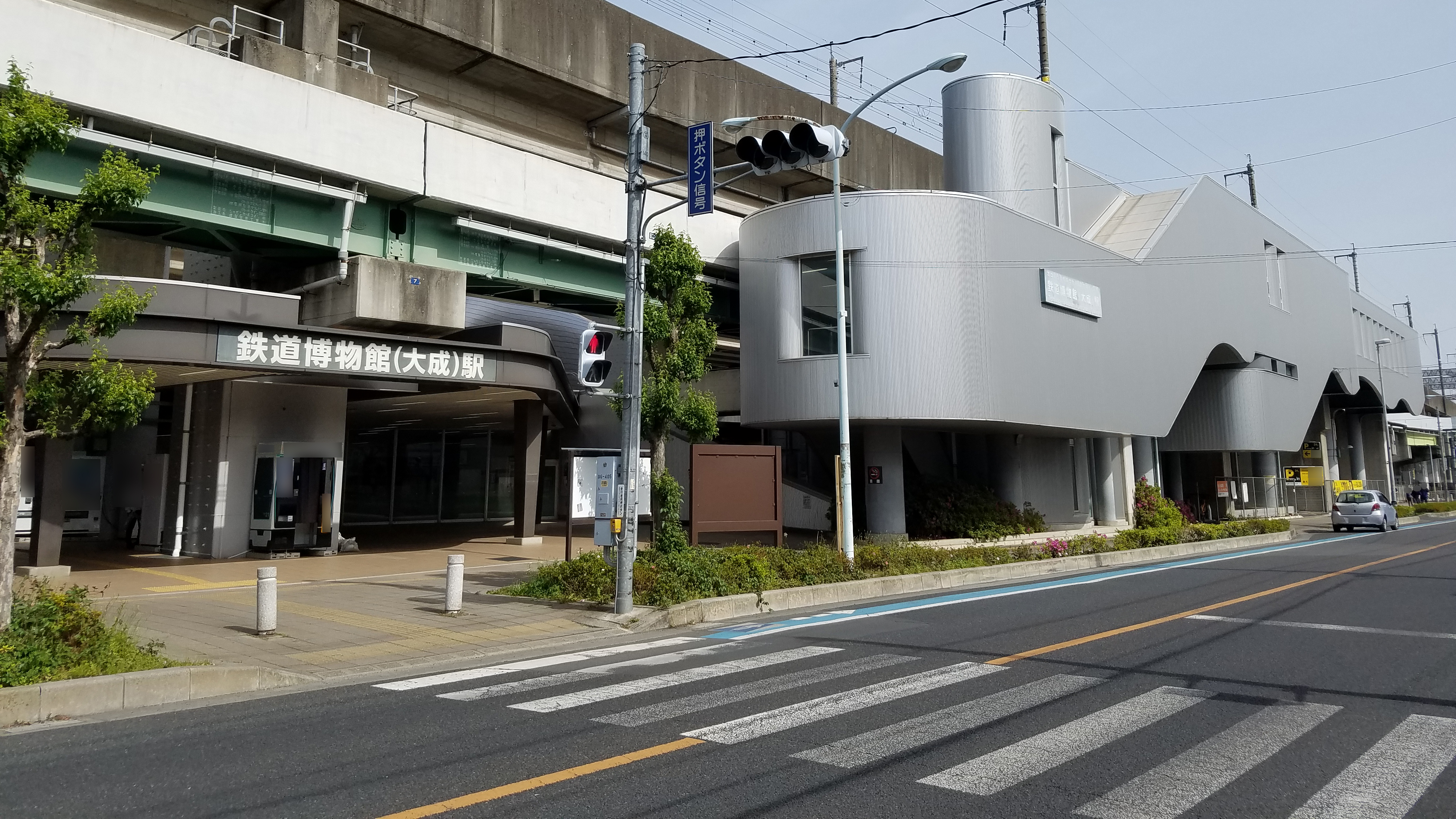
- Tetsudō-Hakubutsukan Station in May 2021

General information
- Other names: Railway Museum Station
- Location: 3 Ōnari-chō; Ōmiya-ku, Saitama; Japan
- Coordinates: 35°55′13″N 139°37′05″E
- Operator: Saitama New Urban Transit
- Line: New Shuttle
- Distance: 1.5 km (0.93 mi) from Ōmiya
- Platforms: 2 side platforms
- Tracks: 2

Construction
- Structure type: Elevated

Other information
- Station code: NS02
- Website: www.new-shuttle.jp/station/tetsudohakubutsukan.html

History
- Opened: 22 December 1983; 42 years ago
- Former names: Ōnari (until 2007)

Passengers
- JFY2016: 4,568 daily

Services
Preceding station	New Shuttle	Following station
Ōmiya Terminus	New Shuttle	Kamonomiya towards Uchijuku
Location
- Location within Saitama Prefecture Location within Japan

Tetsudō-Hakubutsukan Station (Japanese: 鉄道博物館駅, Hepburn: Tetsudō-Hakubutsukan-eki; lit. 'Railway Museum Station') is a passenger railway station on the New Shuttle (Ina Line) located in Ōmiya-ku, Saitama, Japan, operated by the Saitama New Urban Transit Company.

== Lines ==
Tetsudō-Hakubutsukan Station is served by the New Shuttle Ina Line, and is 1.5 kilometres (0.93 mi) from the terminus of the line at Ōmiya.

== Station layout ==
This elevated station consists of two opposed side platforms serving two tracks, located on either side of the Tōhoku Shinkansen viaduct. The station building is located underneath the platforms.

=== Platforms ===
1	■ Ina Line	for Uchijuku
2	■ Ina Line	for Ōmiya

== History ==
The station opened on 22 December 1983 as Ōnari Station (大成駅). On 14 October 2007, it was renamed Tetsudō-Hakubutsukan Station coinciding with opening of the nearby Railway Museum.

== Passenger statistics ==
In Japanese fiscal year 2016, the station was used by an average of 4,568 passengers daily (boarding passengers only).

== Surrounding area ==
- Railway Museum
- National Route 17
- Kita-Ōmiya Station (Tōbu Urban Park Line)

== See also ==
- List of railway stations in Japan
