= 2025 Saitama mayoral election =

Most recent election for Japanese City

Saitama, capital of Saitama Prefecture, held a mayoral election on May 25, 2025.

== Candidates ==
- Hayato Shimizu, incumbent independent mayor since 2009.
- Satoshi Nishiuchi, supported by the Conservative Party of Japan.
- Ryo Sawada, independent (former member of Japan Restoration Party).
- Yoshimitsu Kagawa, supported by the Japanese Communist Party (JCP).
- Nariaki Obukuro, independent musician.

== Results ==
Candidate	Party	Votes	%
Hayato Shimizu	Independent	177,217	45.61
Ryo Sawada	Independent	97,160	25.01
Satoshi Nishiuchi	Conservative Party of Japan	55,395	14.26
Nariaki Obukuro	Independent	32,836	8.45
Yoshimitsu Kagawa	Japanese Communist Party	25,946	6.68
Total		388,554	100.00
