= Ōmiya Park =

Public park in Saitama, Japan

Coordinates: 35.919024°N 139.630819°E

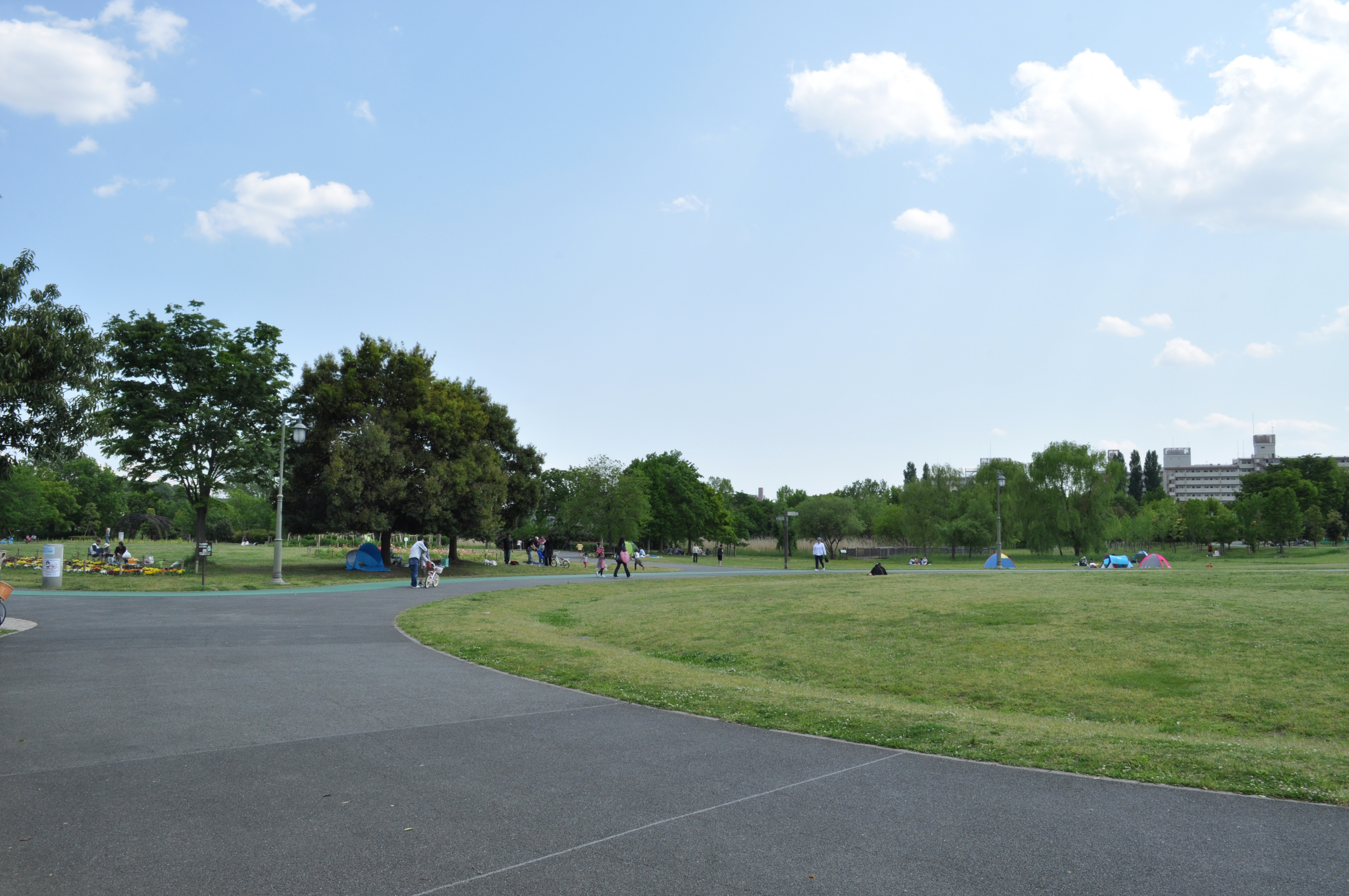
A picture of Ōmiya Park

Ōmiya Park (大宮公園, Ōmiya Kōen) is a public park located 1 km (0.62 mi) northeast of Ōmiya Station and the most visited park in Saitama. The park encompasses a huge area of 67.9 ha (168 acres) (as of 2004) and is famous for Japanese Red Pine forest and cherry blossoms. In particular, the park ranks in the Top 100 Locations in Japan for Cherry Blossoms.

The Ōmiya Baseball Stadium was the first stadium to hold NPB's postseason game other than original homegrounds.

== History ==
=== Ōmiya Park ===
In 1885, the park opened its door to the public as a prefectural public park. In 1921, a large-scale expansion project was undertaken including the planting of cherry trees and the construction of Ōmiya Park Baseball Stadium. In 1962, the park is designated to be a part of urban planning. In 1980, Ōmiya Second Park opened to the east of Ōmiya Park. In 2001, Ōmiya Third Park was established beyond the southern perimeter of Ōmiya Second Park.

=== Ōmiya Second Park ===
Ōmiya Second Park refers to a section that occupies the western side of Prefectural Road 35. It was established in 1980 with 650 Japanese apricot trees interspersed within the grounds of the park. In 1996, the Fragrance Road accessible to wheelchairs was constructed. Visitors can enjoy displays of flowers and fragrances of trees that change with season year around. Each year between mid-February to March, the Japanese Apricot Festival is held.

=== Ōmiya Third Park ===
Ōmiya Third Park is the name of an area that is located to the south of Ōmiya Second Park. It became accessible to the public in 2001. The initial plan was to relocate Ōmiya Park Baseball Stadium or Ōmiya Park Soccer Stadium to this site. Later, the plan was altered to incorporate the pristine scenery of Minuma and create an open space that accommodates both people and nature. The park highlights the images of greenery, water, and light.

== Facilities ==
- Ōmiya Park Baseball Stadium
- NACK5 Stadium Ōmiya (Ōmiya Park Soccer Stadium)
- Ōmiy Keirin Track
- Saitama Prefectural Museum of History and Folklore

== Access ==
- 20-minute walk from Ōmiya Station
- 10-minute walk from Tōbu Noda Line Ōmiya-kōen Station
