= University of Human Arts and Sciences =

Coordinates: 35.970790°N 139.658320°E

- 人間総合科学大学
- Type: Private
- Established: 1953
- President: Takeshi Kusumi
- Location: 1288 Magome, Iwatsuki-ku, Saitama, Saitama Prefecture, Japan
- Website: human.ac.jp

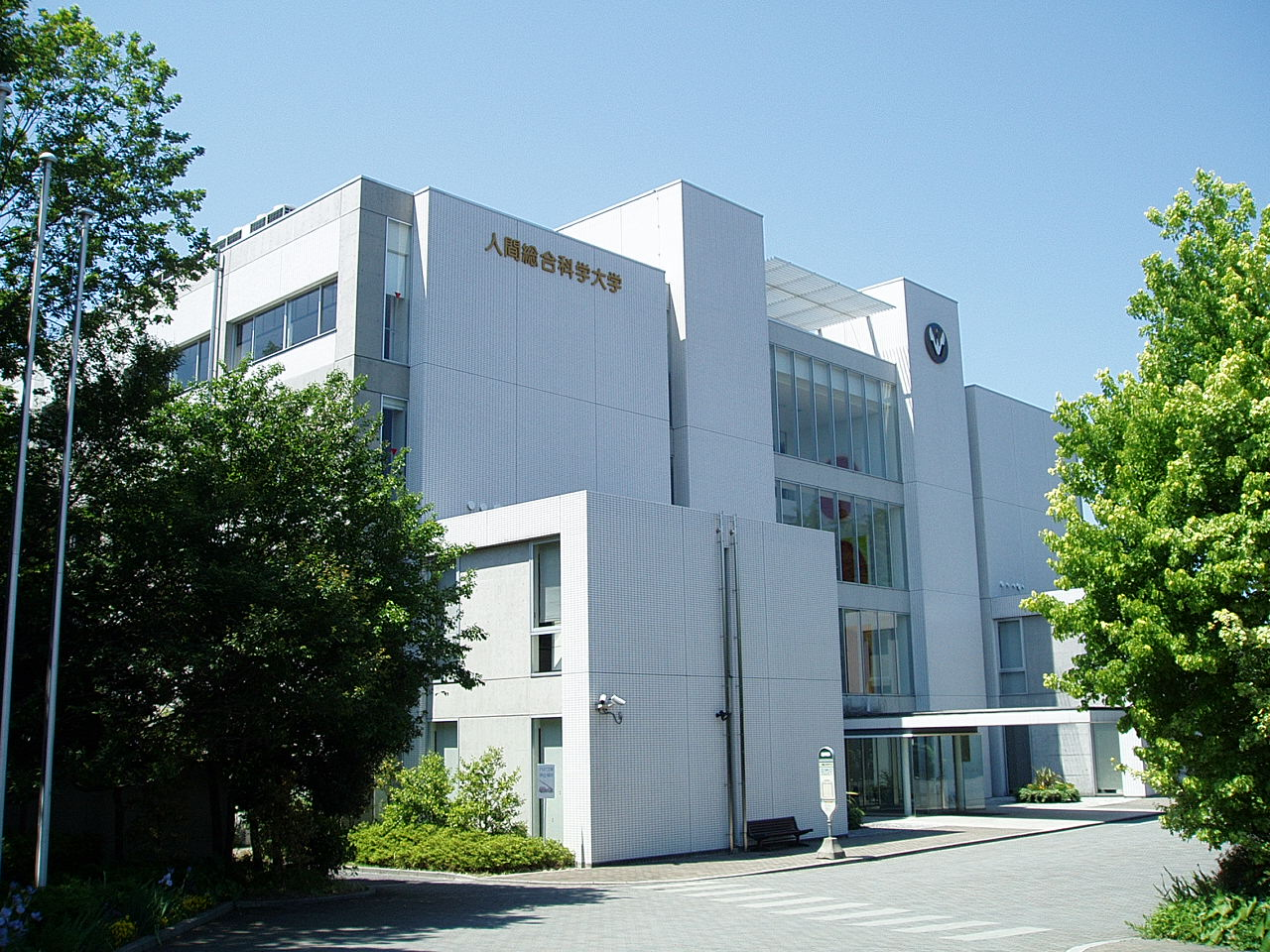
Headquarters in the Hasuda Campus

The University of Human Arts and Sciences (Japanese: 人間総合科学大学, Hepburn: Ningen sōgō kagaku daigaku) is a private distance learning university with headquarters in Iwatsuki-ku, Saitama, Saitama, Japan, established in 2000. It has a satellite campus in Chiyoda, Tokyo. The predecessor of the university, Tokyo Chiropractic School, was founded in 1953.
