= Kita-Ōmiya Station =

Railway station in Saitama, Japan

TD02 Kita-Ōmiya Station 北大宮駅
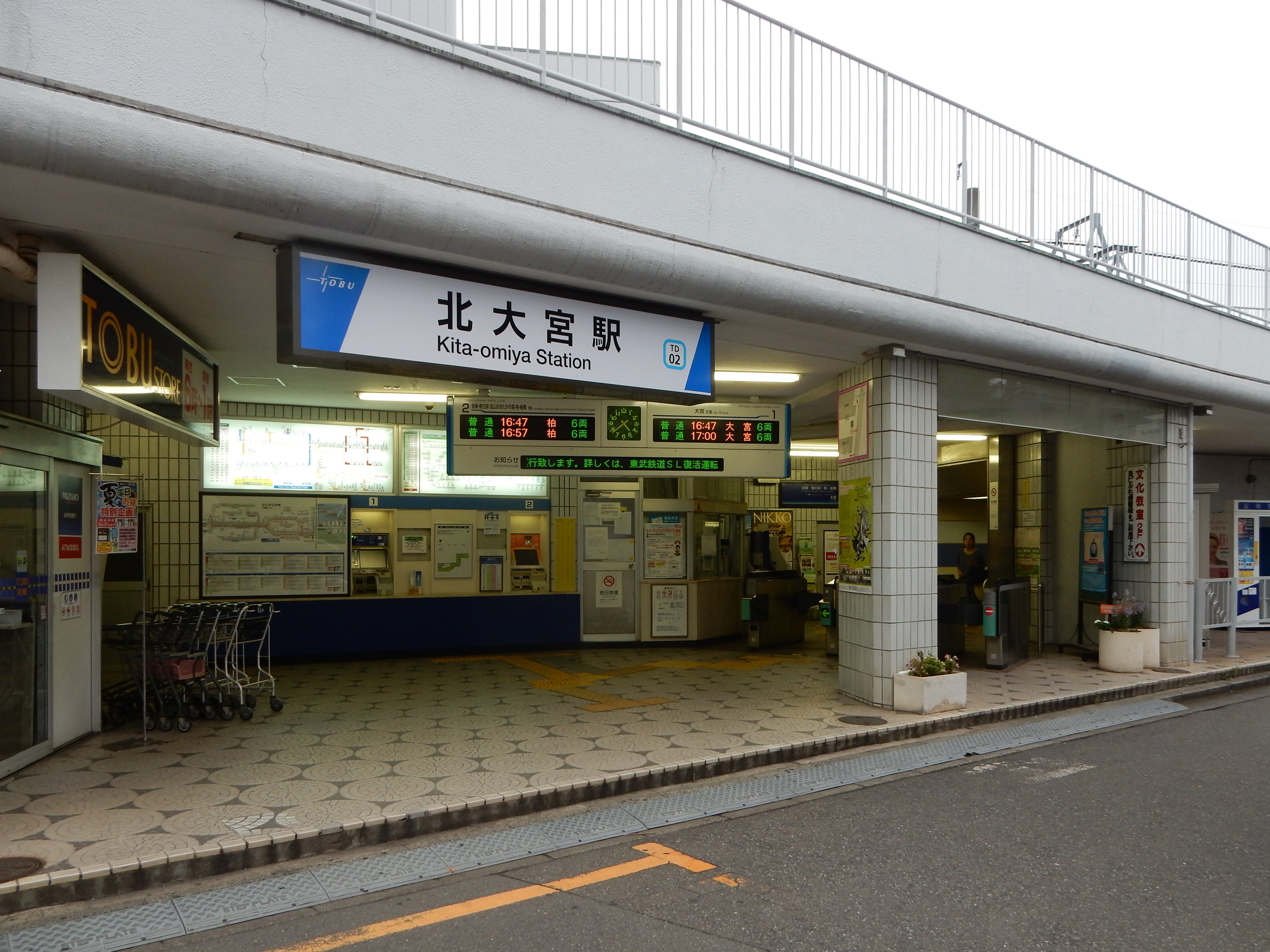
- Kita-omiya Station entrance in August 2017

General information
- Location: 3-285 Dotechō, Ōmiya-ku, Saitama-shi, Saitama-ken 330-0801; Japan
- Coordinates: 35.9169°N 139.6249°E
- Operator: Tobu Railway
- Line: Tobu Urban Park Line
- Distance: 1.2 km from Ōmiya
- Platforms: 1 island platform
- Tracks: 2

Other information
- Station code: TD-02
- Website: Official website

History
- Opened: 12 April 1930; 96 years ago

Passengers
- FY2019: 6321 daily

Services
| Preceding station | Tobu Railway | Following station |
|---|---|---|
| Ōmiya TD01 Terminus | Tōbu Urban Park Line Local | Ōmiya-kōen TD03 towards Funabashi |
Location
- Location within Saitama Prefecture Location within Japan

Kita-Ōmiya Station (北大宮駅, Kita-Ōmiya-eki) is a passenger railway station on the Tōbu Urban Park Line in Ōmiya-ku, Saitama, Saitama Prefecture, Japan, operated by the private railway operator Tōbu Railway.

== Lines ==
Kita-Ōmiya Station is served by the 62.7 km Tōbu Urban Park Line from Ōmiya in Saitama Prefecture to Funabashi in Chiba Prefecture. Located between Ōmiya and Ōmiya-kōen, it is 1.2 km (0.75 mi) from the line's starting point at Ōmiya.

== Station layout ==
The station consists of an elevated island platform serving two tracks, with the station building located underneath.

=== Platforms ===
| 1 | ■ Tōbu Urban Park Line | for Ōmiya |
| 2 | ■ Tōbu Urban Park Line | for Iwatsuki, Kasukabe, and Kashiwa |

== History ==
The station opened on 12 April 1930.

From 17 March 2012, station numbering was introduced on all Tōbu lines, with Kita-omiya Station becoming "TD-02".

== Passenger statistics ==
In fiscal 2019, the station was used by an average of 6321 passengers daily.

== Surrounding area ==
- Hikawa Shrine
- Ōmiya Park
- Ōmiya Post Office

== See also ==
- List of railway stations in Japan
