= Railway Museum (Saitama) =

The Railway Museum
- 鉄道博物館

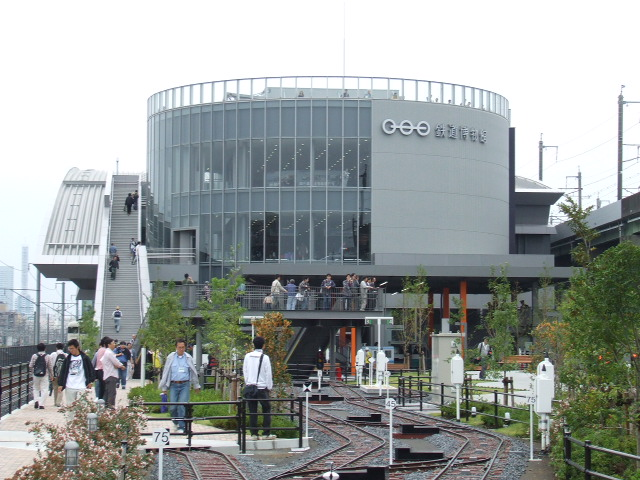
- The Railway Museum in Saitama

- Location of the museum Railway Museum (Saitama) (Japan)
- Established: 14 October 2007
- Location: Saitama, Saitama, Japan
- Coordinates: 35°55′16″N 139°37′05″E
- Type: Railway museum
- Public transit access: The Railway Museum Station, New Shuttle
- Website: www.railway-museum.jp

The Railway Museum (鉄道博物館, Tetsudō Hakubutsukan) is a railway museum in Saitama, Saitama, Japan, which opened on 14 October 2007. It was built and is operated by the East Japan Railway Culture Foundation, a non-profit subsidiary of the East Japan Railway Company (JR East). It consists of a 19,800 m^{2} building on a site covering 42,500 m^{2}, with a display area 9,500 m^{2} in size.

The museum features about 30 railway cars, train cab simulators, railway model dioramas, mini trains, storage for artifacts and books, video booths, a multi-purpose hall, a gallery balcony, a cafeteria, a museum shop, and a research room.

== Facility ==
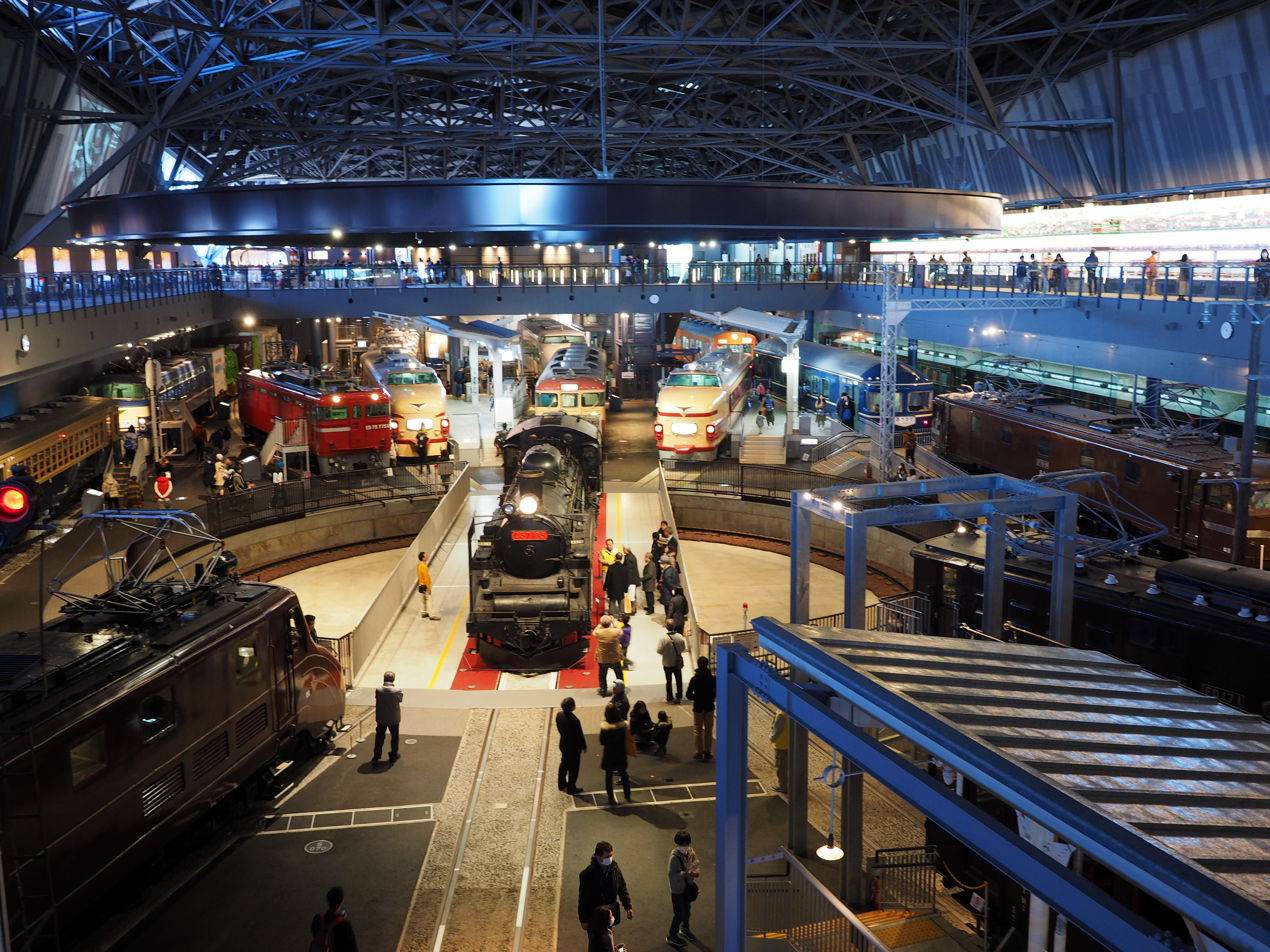
Main exhibition hall

The museum places emphasis on learning through interactive experiences and is mainly divided into two zones: the history zone and the learning zone. The history zone recounts the history of railway technology with the help of trains that were in service in the past. In the learning zone, visitors can gain knowledge of the principles and mechanisms of railway with the use of actual parts and models. The tour of the museum takes roughly two hours with extra time for interactive exhibits.

A library room, known as the "Teppaku Reading Room" opened on 21 July 2012 in the remodelled North Wing of the museum.

== History ==
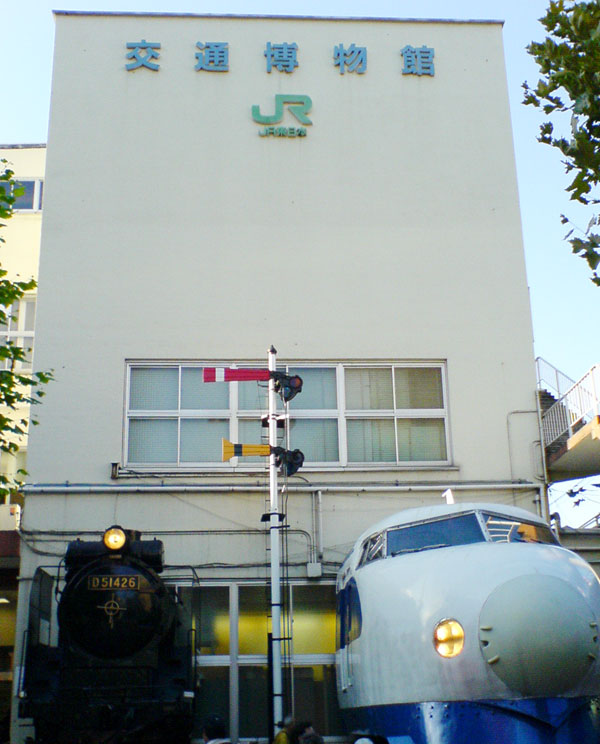
The former Transportation Museum in Tokyo, which closed in 2006

The present Railway Museum is the successor to the Transportation Museum (交通博物館, Kōtsū Hakubutsukan) in Chiyoda, Tokyo. This museum also opened as the Railway Museum under the elevated railway track near Tokyo Station celebrating the beginning of the 50th year of the railways in Japan on 14 October 1921. In 1936, the Railway Museum was relocated to the new facility built in the place of former building of Manseibashi Station, which station continued to operate until 1943 as an accessory of the museum. The museum was renamed the Transportation Museum in 1948 to cover various means of transportation. On 14 May 2006, the museum was closed pending a move to the new Railway Museum in Saitama.

In November 2012, it was announced that the Railway Museum would form a sister-museum alliance with the National Railway Museum in York, England.

== Driving simulators ==
The museum features driving simulators that allow visitors to experience being drivers of a D51 steam locomotive, an E5 Shinkansen train, and trains on the Tokaido Line, the Keihin Tohoku Line, and the Yamanote Line. Simulators require a reservation obtained via reservation terminals installed in the museum and cost 600 yen. The D51 simulator is appropriate for junior high school students and older, the other simulators allow elementary school students as well.

== Exhibits ==
The following full-size vehicles are on display.

=== Locomotives ===
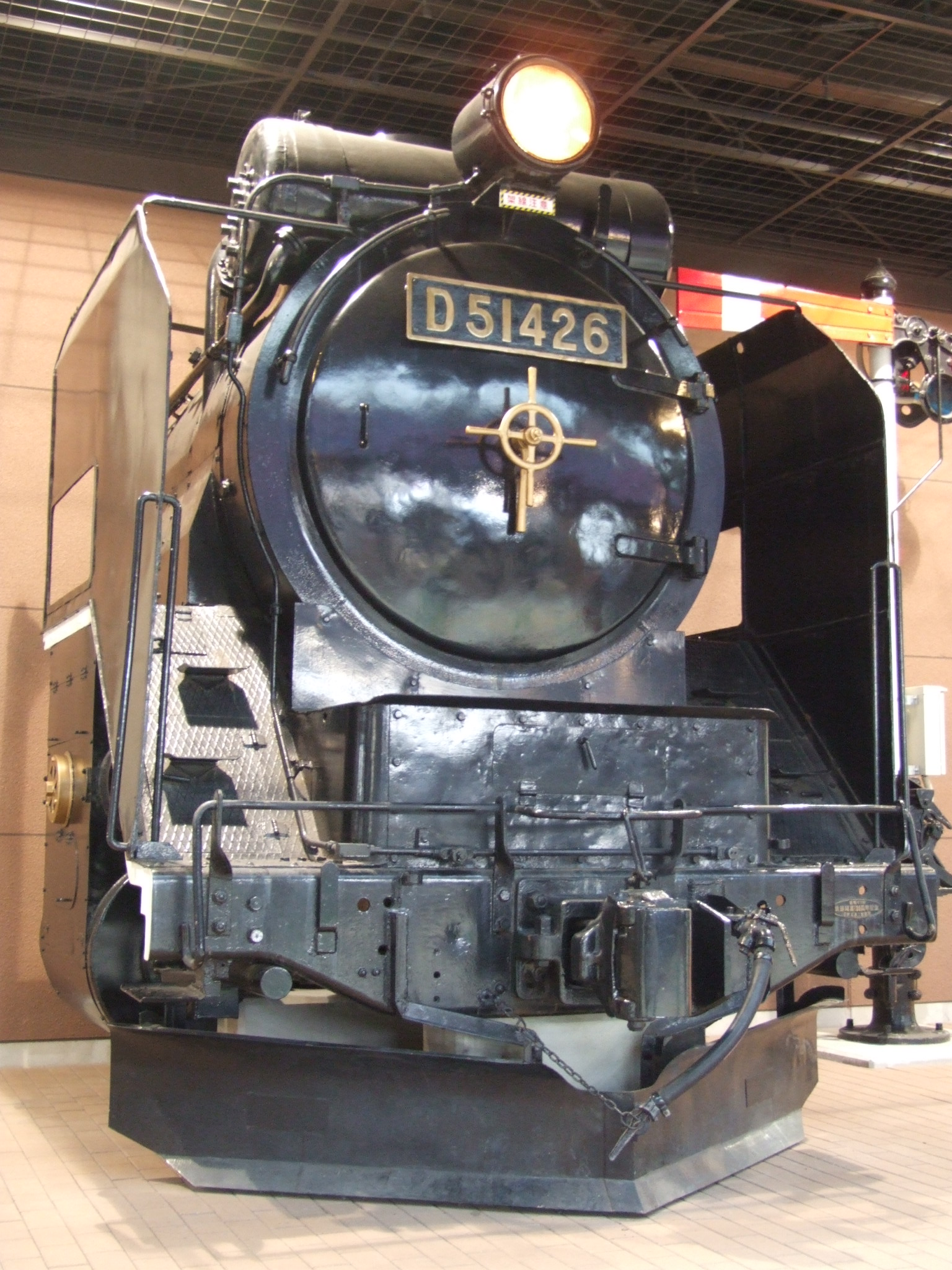
Front end of D51 steam locomotive

- Class 150 steam locomotive – No. 1, the first locomotive to operate in Japan
- Class 1290 steam locomotive – No. 1292 Zenko
- JNR Class 7100 steam locomotive – No. 7101 Benkei
- JNR Class 9850 Mallet steam locomotive – No. 9856, cut away to show internal workings
- JNR Class C51 steam locomotive – No. C51 5
- JNR Class C57 steam locomotive – No. C57 135, the locomotive that hauled the last scheduled steam service in 1975
- Class DD13 diesel locomotive – No. DD13 1
- Class ED17 electric locomotive – No. ED17 1
- Class ED40 electric locomotive – No. ED40 10
- Class EF55 electric locomotive – No. EF55 1 (since 12 April 2015)
- Class EF58 electric locomotive – No. EF58 89
- Class EF66 electric locomotive – No. EF66 11
- Class ED75 electric locomotive – No. ED75 775

=== Electric railcars ===
- Hanifu1 passenger and luggage carriage (formerly car De963)
- Class Nade 6110 electric railcar – No. Nade 6141
- Class Kumoha 40 electric railcar – No. Kumoha 40074
- 101 series electric multiple unit car – No. Kumoha 101-902
- 181 series electric multiple unit car – No. Kuha 181-45
- 455 series electric multiple unit car – No. Kumoha 455-1
- 485 series electric multiple unit car – No. Kuha 481-26
- 485 series electric multiple unit car – No. Moha 484-61
- 0 Series Shinkansen car – No. 21-2
- 0 Series Shinkansen car – No. 21-25 (cab section only)
- 200 Series Shinkansen car – No. 222-35
- 400 Series Shinkansen car – No. 411-3
- E1 Series Shinkansen car – No. E153-104
- E5 Series Shinkansen car- No. E514-9001

=== Diesel railcars ===
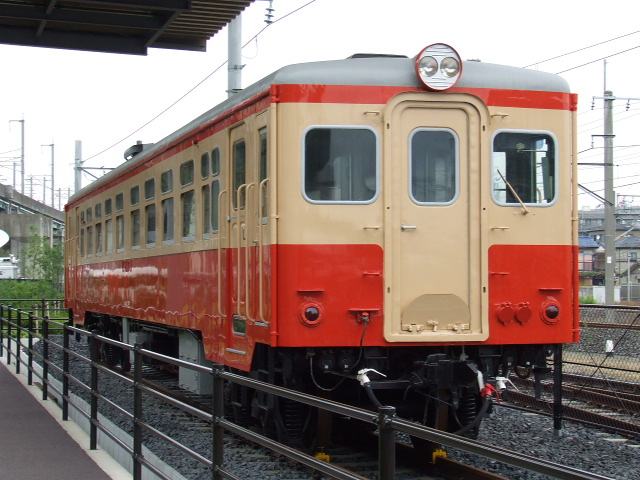
KiHa 11 DMU

- Class KiHa 41300 railcar – No. KiHa 41056
- Class KiHa 11 railcar – No. KiHa 11 25

=== Passenger carriages ===
- Kotoku 5010 Kaitakushi passenger carriage
- 31 series passenger carriage – No. Oha 31026
- Maite 39 passenger carriage – No. Maite 39 11
- 20 series sleeping car – No. Nahanefu 22 1

=== Imperial carriages ===
- Imperial Carriage No. 1 – first one of the cars so numbered
- Imperial Carriage No. 2 – first one of the cars so numbered
- Imperial Carriage No. 7
- Imperial Carriage No. 9
- Imperial Carriage No. 10
- Imperial Carriage No. 12

=== Freight vehicles ===
- Remufu10000 refrigerator wagon – No. Remufu 10000
- Koki50000 container wagon – No. Koki 50000

The English class names of the cars and locomotives listed above are largely based on the English version of Floor Guide of the museum as of October 2007.

== Access ==
The museum is located adjacent to Tetsudō-Hakubutsukan Station on the New Shuttle people mover, one stop from Ōmiya Station, a hub station of the JR East system. The museum has a limited number of parking spaces.

=== Address ===
3-47 Ōnari-chō, Ōmiya-ku, Saitama-shi, Saitama-ken 330-0852

== Extension ==
A new four-storey extension south building opened in summer 2018. Originally planned to be a five-storey structure opening in autumn 2017, the plans were revised and scaled down in 2016 to reduce excessive costs.

== See also ==
- Kyoto Railway Museum, JR West counterpart in Kyoto
- SCMaglev and Railway Park, JR Central counterpart in Nagoya
