= Hikawa Shrine (Saitama) =

Shinto shrine in Saitama, Japan

Hikawa Shrine 氷川神社
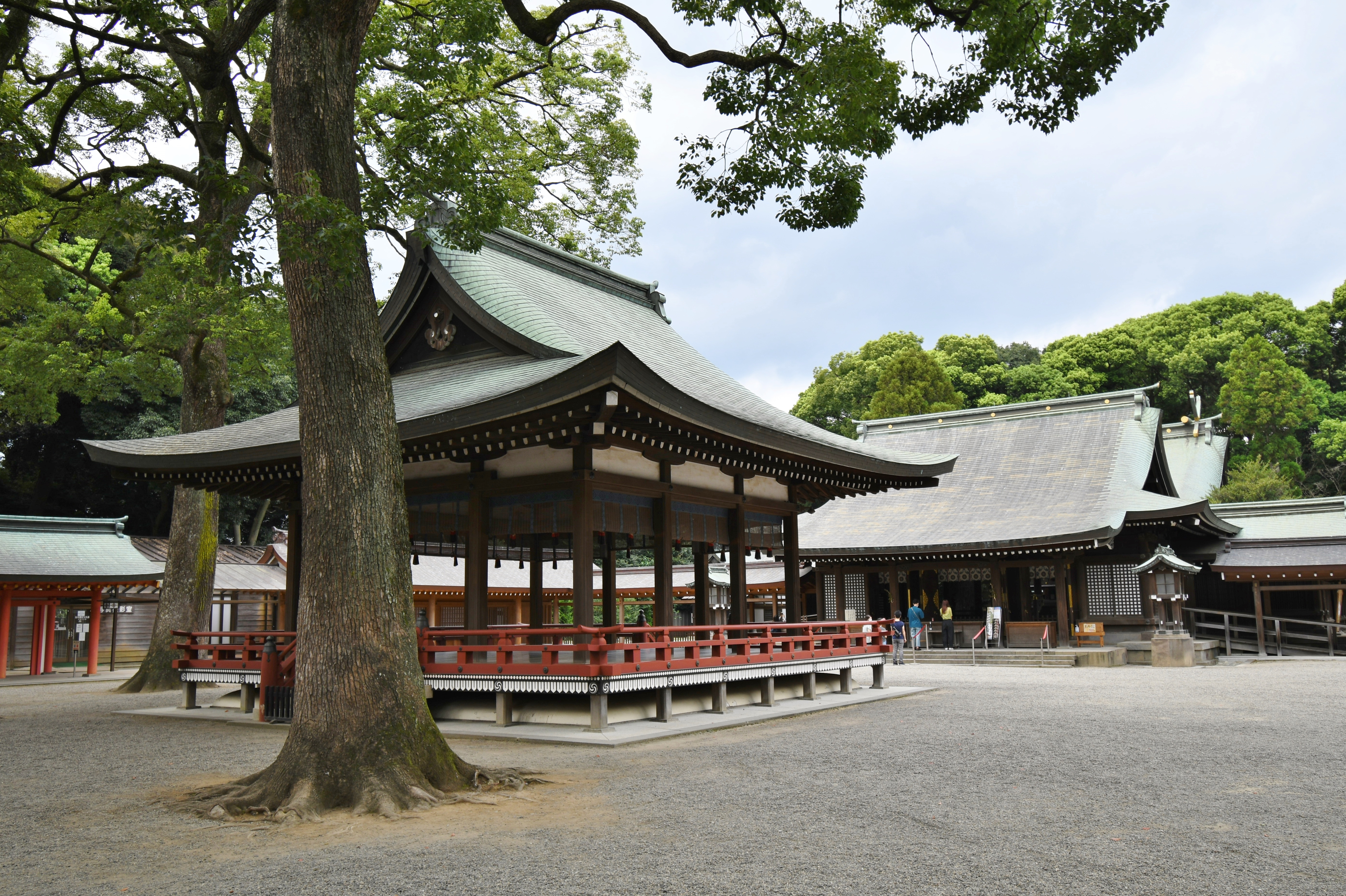
- Precincts of Hikawa Shrine

- Location within Saitama Prefecture Location within Japan

Religion
- Affiliation: Shinto
- Deity: Susanoo; Kushinadahime; Ōkuninushi; Ashinazuchi; Tenazuchi
- Festival: Reitaisai (Annual main festival) (August 1)
- Type: Hikawa shrine

Location
- Location: 1-407, Takahana-cho, Omiya-ku, Saitama-shi, Saitama, Japan
- Interactive map of Hikawa Shrine 氷川神社
- Coordinates: 35°55′00″N 139°37′46″E

Architecture
- Style: Nagare-zukuri
- Founder: Emperor Kōshō
- Established: 473 BCE (according to legend)

Website
- Official website

Hikawa Shrine (氷川神社, Hikawa-jinja) is a Shinto shrine located in Ōmiya-ku, Saitama, Saitama Prefecture, Japan. It is one of the two shrines claiming the title of ichinomiya of former Musashi Province. The main festival of the shrine is held annually on August 1. The district of Omiya, literally "Great Shrine", derives from the special favor shown by Emperor Meiji, who raised Hikawa above all other shrines in the Kantō region. It is the head of a network of approximately 280 Hikawa shrines mostly around the Kantō region.

== Enshrined kami ==
The kami enshrined at Hikawa Jinja are:

- Susanoo-no-Mikoto (須佐之男命), brother of Amaterasu, god of sea, storms, fields, the harvest, marriage, and love
- Inada-hime no Mikoto (稲田姫命), wife of Susanoo, goddess of rice, agriculture, marriage, love, childbirth, and child rearing
- Ōnamuchi no Mikoto (大己貴命), god of nation-building, agriculture, medicine, and protective magic

== History ==
According to the shrine's tradition, the shrine was established during the reign of the legendary Emperor Kōshō in 473 BC, when the ruling clan of the area, the Musashi kuni no miyatsuko migrated to this region from Izumo, bring with them the worship Susanoo. There is also a legend that the folk hero Yamato Takeru who injured his leg during his expedition to conquer eastern Japan for the Yamato kingdom, visited the shrine in accordance with the directions of an old man who appeared in a dream. After worshiping, he was able to stand on his own. It is known that the old name of the region, Adachi (足立), literally meaning "leg stand", was named after this incidence. The pond within the grounds of the shrine is a remnant of Minuma and considered to have roots in enshrining the water god of Minuma (a vast swamp that existed until the middle of the Edo period), with the shrine built on a hill or promontory which extended into the swamp. The shrine first appears in the historical record in an entry in the Nihon Sandai Jitsuroku which was compiled in 901. In the Engishiki records, it is listed as a myōjin taishi (名神大社).

During the Heian period, Taira no Sadamori prayed for victory over Taira no Masakado during the Tengyō no Ran. In the Kamakura period, Minamoto no Yoritomo ordered Doi Sanehira to rebuild the shrine in 1180, and made many donations. Despite the worship of many prominent people, and the fact that it is the only myōjin taishi in Musashi, the Hikawa Shrine was not originally regarded as the ichinomiya of the province. The Azuma Kagami and other contemporary sources give this title to the Ono Shrine what is now the city of Tama, whereas the Hikawa Shrine is styled the "san-no-miya" of the province instead. On the other hand, the late Muromachi period Dai-Nippon-koku Ichinomiya ki (大日本国一宮記) clearly refers to the Hikawa Shrine as the ichinomiya. During the Edo Period, the shrine prospered greatly from its location in Ōmiya-juku, which was a post station on the Nakasendō.

Following the Meiji restoration, Emperor Meiji relocated from Kyoto to Tokyo via the Nakasendō in 1868, stopping at this shrine to worship. in 1870, he made it one of chokusaisha and visited for a second time. The shrine was also given the rank of Imperial shrine, 1st rank (官幣大社, Kanpei-taisha) under the State Shinto Modern system of ranked Shinto shrines. The main shrine structure was renovated in 1882. In 1940, a project financed by the government reconstructed the main shrine structure, the gate tower, and other structures. In 1976, the Large Torii of Meiji Shrine which had been damaged by lightning in 1966 was repaired and relocated to Hikawa Shrine.

== Gallery ==
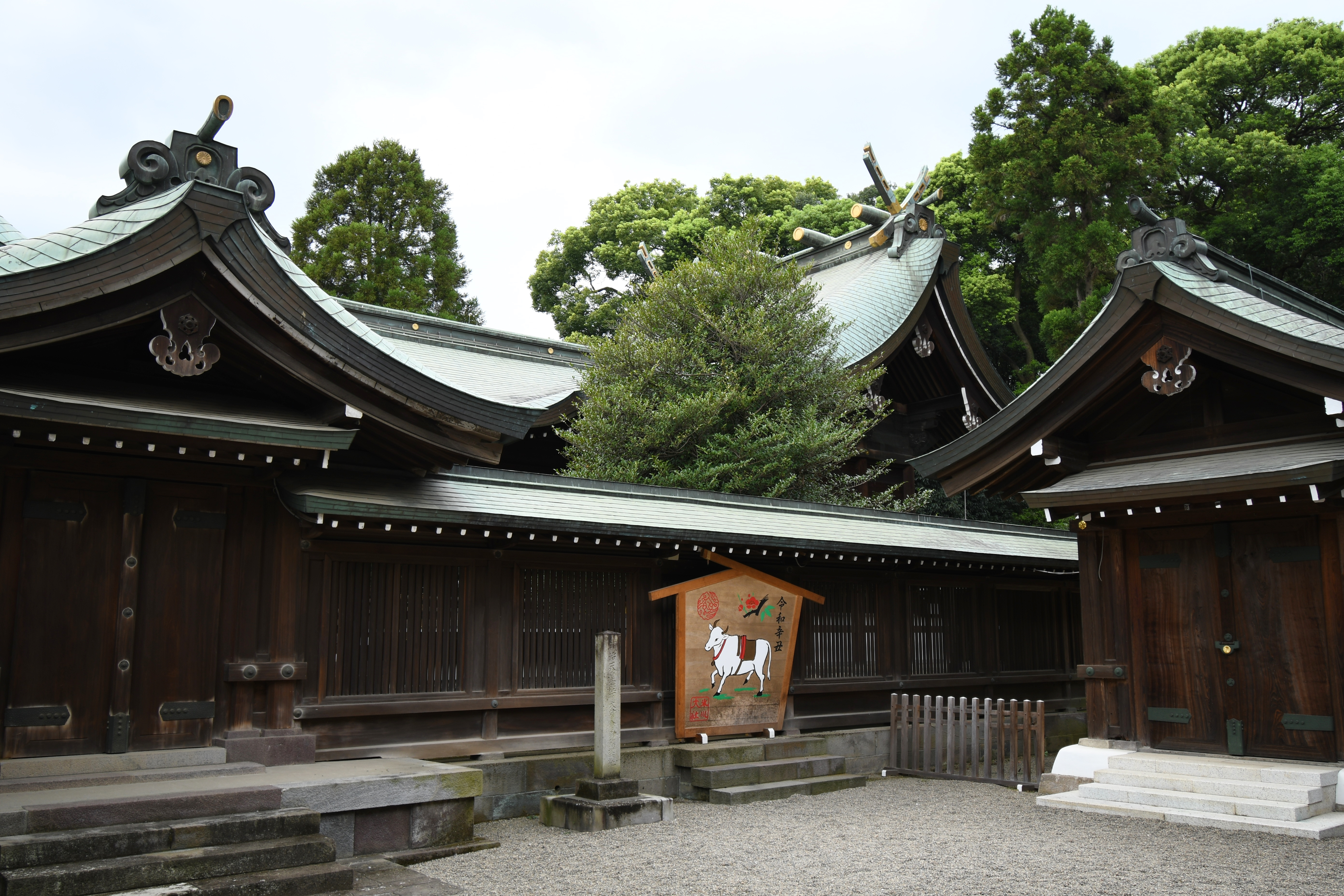
Honden

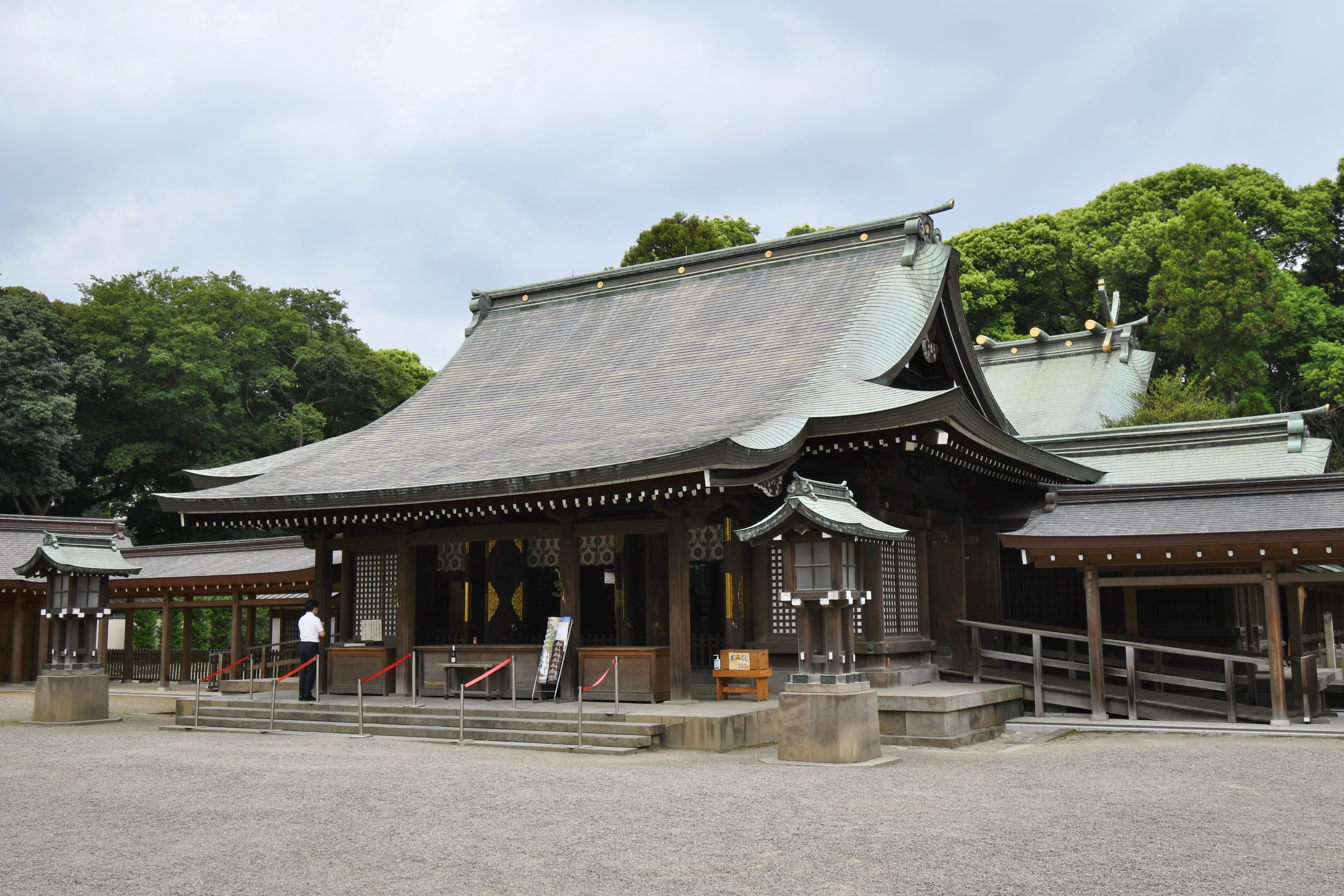
Haiden

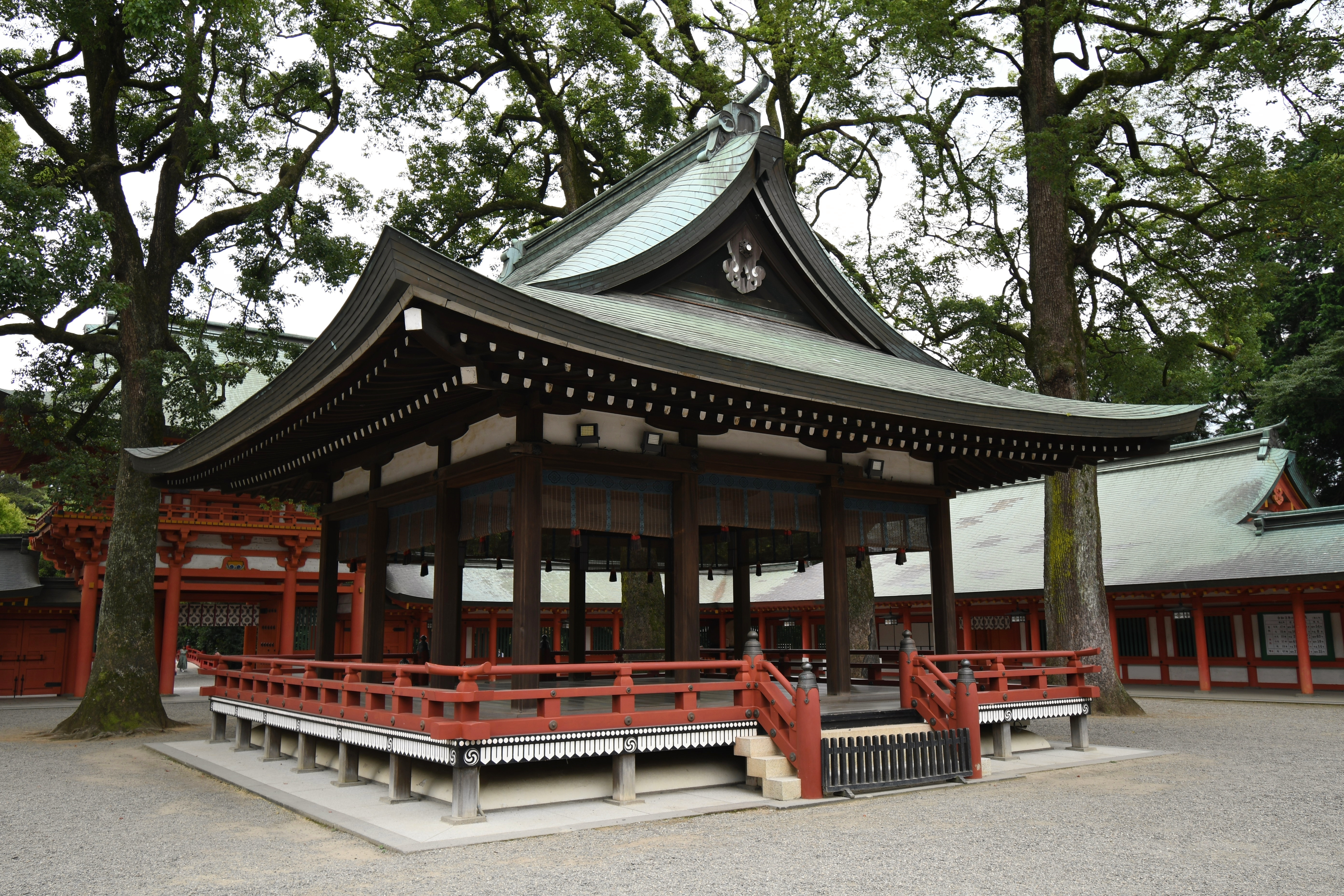
Maidono

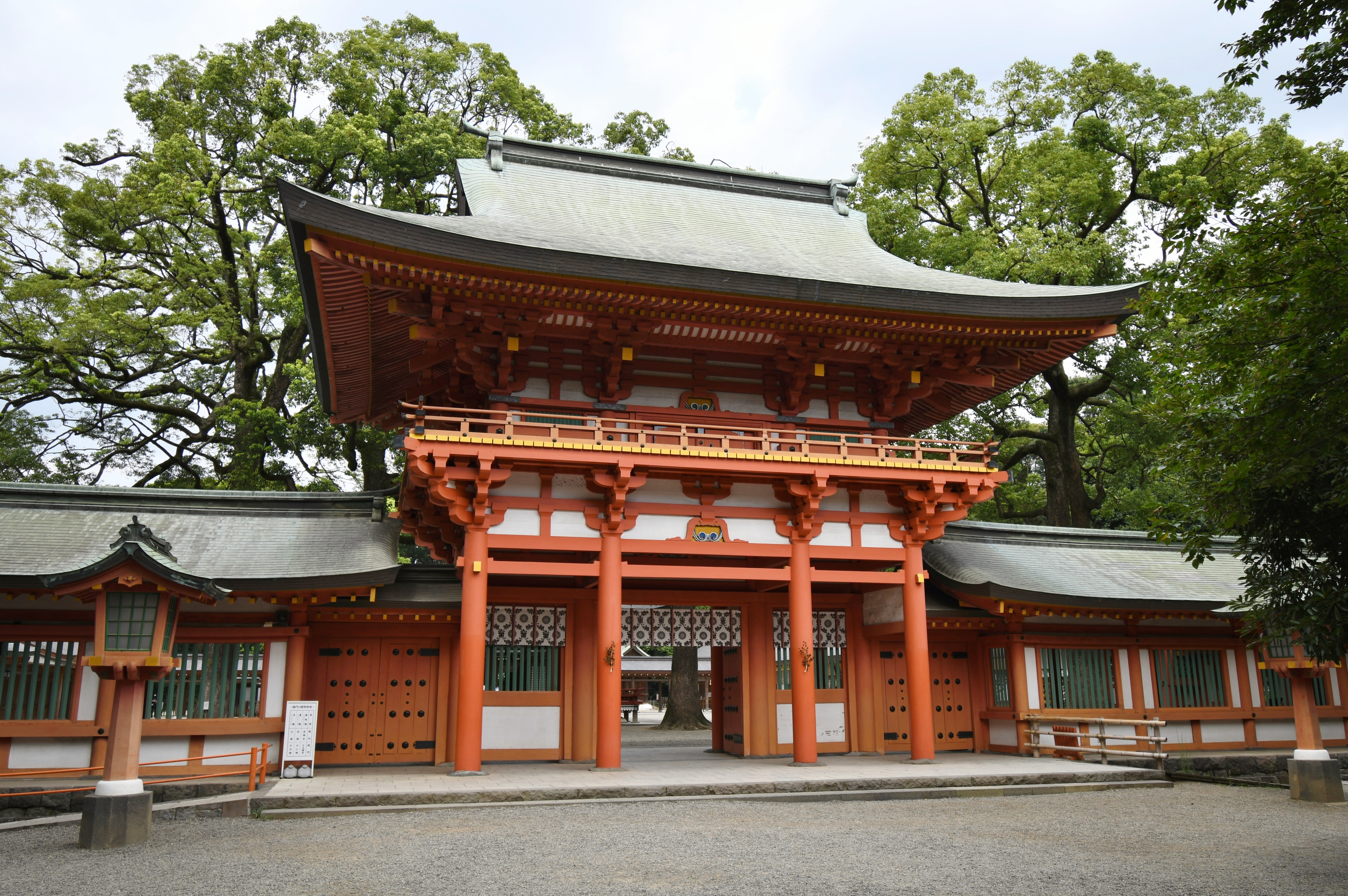
Rōmon

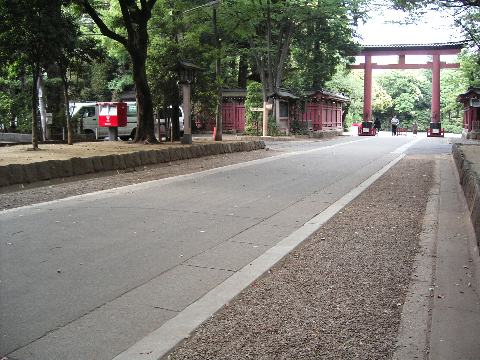
Entrance torii

Kagura-den

== Cultural Properties ==
=== Saitama Prefecture Designated Tangible Cultural Properties ===
- Hikawa Jinja Imperial Visit emaki (氷川神社行幸絵巻), Meiji period, Colored on silk. A picture scroll depicting Emperor Meiji's Imperial Visit in 1868.

=== Imperial visits to the shrine ===
- December 11, 1868: Emperor Meiji's first visit.
- 1870: The emperor worships at Hikawa.
- 1873: The emperor moves in state to the shrine.
- August 31, 1878: The emperor travels from Tokyo to Hikawa.
- 1896: The Crown Prince Yoshihito visits the shrine.
- 1917: The Crown Prince Hirohito visits the Hikawa.
- 1919: The Regent Hirohito (sesshō) visits the shrine.
- 1920: Empress Sadako (kogō) visits Hikawa.

== Access ==
- 10-minute walk from Kita-Ōmiya Station or Ōmiya-kōen Station on the Tōbu Noda Line
- 20-minute walk from Omiya Station (JR East or Tōbu Noda Line)

== See also ==
- List of Shinto shrines
- Twenty-Two Shrines
- Modern system of ranked Shinto Shrines
- Hikawa Maru
- Ichinomiya
