= Kokusai Gakuin Saitama Junior College =

Coordinates: 35°54′0.6″N 139°37′33.5″E

Kokusai Gakuin Saitama Junior College (国際学院埼玉短期大学, Kokusai-gakuin saitama tanki daigaku) is a private junior college in Saitama, Saitama, Japan, established in 1983. Though the institution is coeducational, female students greatly outnumbers male students. In July 2004 it was selected for Good Practice, a grant program by the Ministry of Education.
