= Ōmiya-kōen Station =

Railway station in Saitama, Japan

TD03 Ōmiya-kōen Station 大宮公園駅
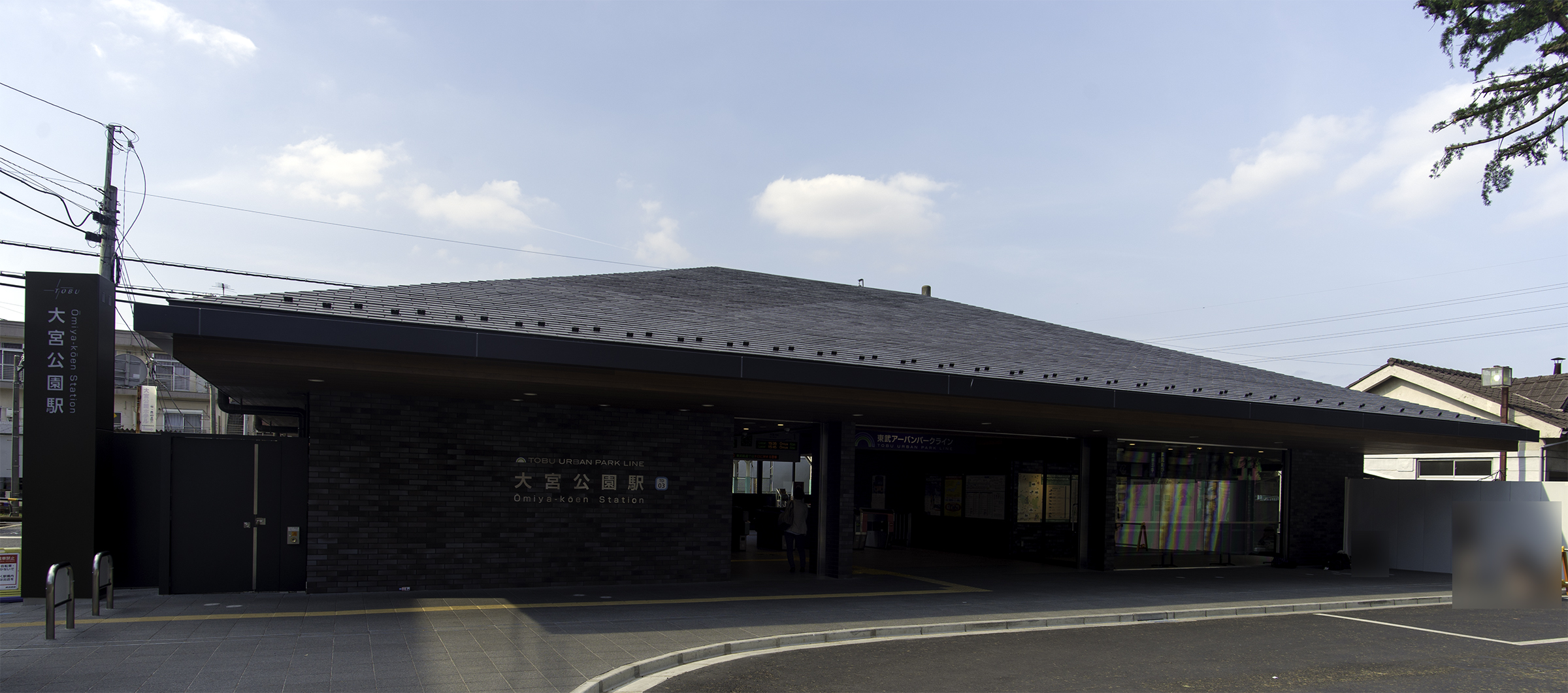
- Ōmiya-kōen Station in May 2016

General information
- Location: 1-172-1 Junochō, Ōmiya-ku, Saitama-shi, Saitama-ken 330-0805; Japan
- Coordinates: 35°55′25″N 139°37′57″E
- Operator: Tōbu Railway
- Line: Tōbu Urban Park Line
- Distance: 2.2 km from Ōmiya
- Platforms: 2 side platforms
- Tracks: 2

Other information
- Station code: TD-03
- Website: Official website

History
- Opened: 17 November 1929; 96 years ago

Passengers
- FY2019: 9772 daily

Services
Preceding station	Tobu Railway	Following station
Kita-Ōmiya TD02 towards Ōmiya	Tōbu Urban Park Line Local	Ōwada TD04 towards Funabashi
Location
- Location within Saitama Prefecture Location within Japan

Ōmiya-kōen Station (大宮公園駅, Ōmiya-kōen-eki) is a passenger railway station on the Tōbu Urban Park Line located in Ōmiya-ku, Saitama, Saitama Prefecture, Japan, operated by the private railway operator Tōbu Railway.

== Lines ==
Ōmiya-kōen Station is served by the 62.7 km (39.0 mi) Tōbu Urban Park Line from Ōmiya in Saitama Prefecture to Funabashi in Chiba Prefecture. Located between Kita-Ōmiya and Ōwada, it is 2.2 km (1.4 mi) from the line's starting point at Ōmiya.

== Station layout ==
The station consists of two opposed side platforms serving two tracks, connected to the station building by a footbridge.

=== Platforms ===
1	■ Tōbu Urban Park Line	for Ōmiya
2	■ Tōbu Urban Park Line	for Iwatsuki, Kasukabe, and Kashiwa

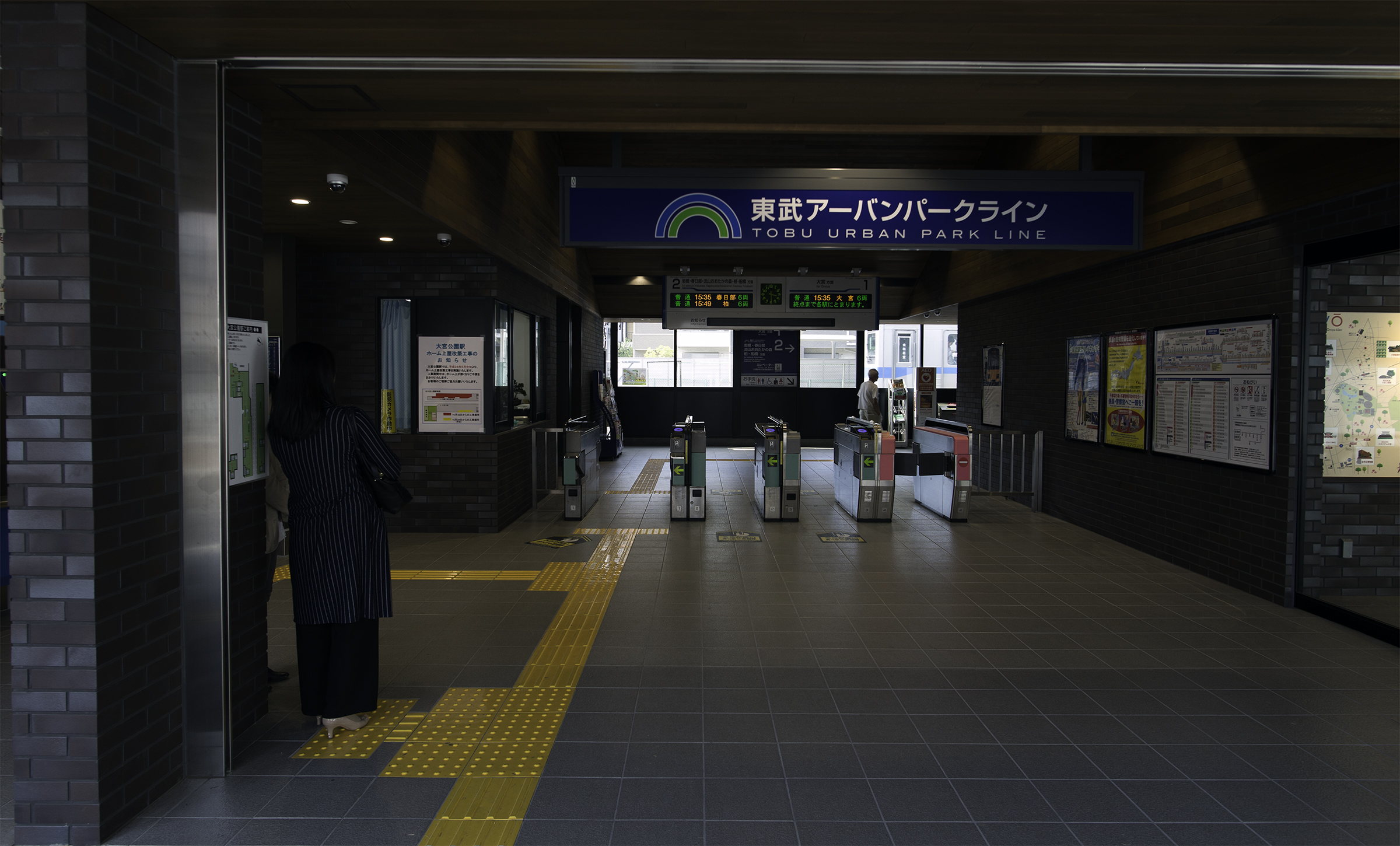
The ticket barriers in May 2016

== History ==
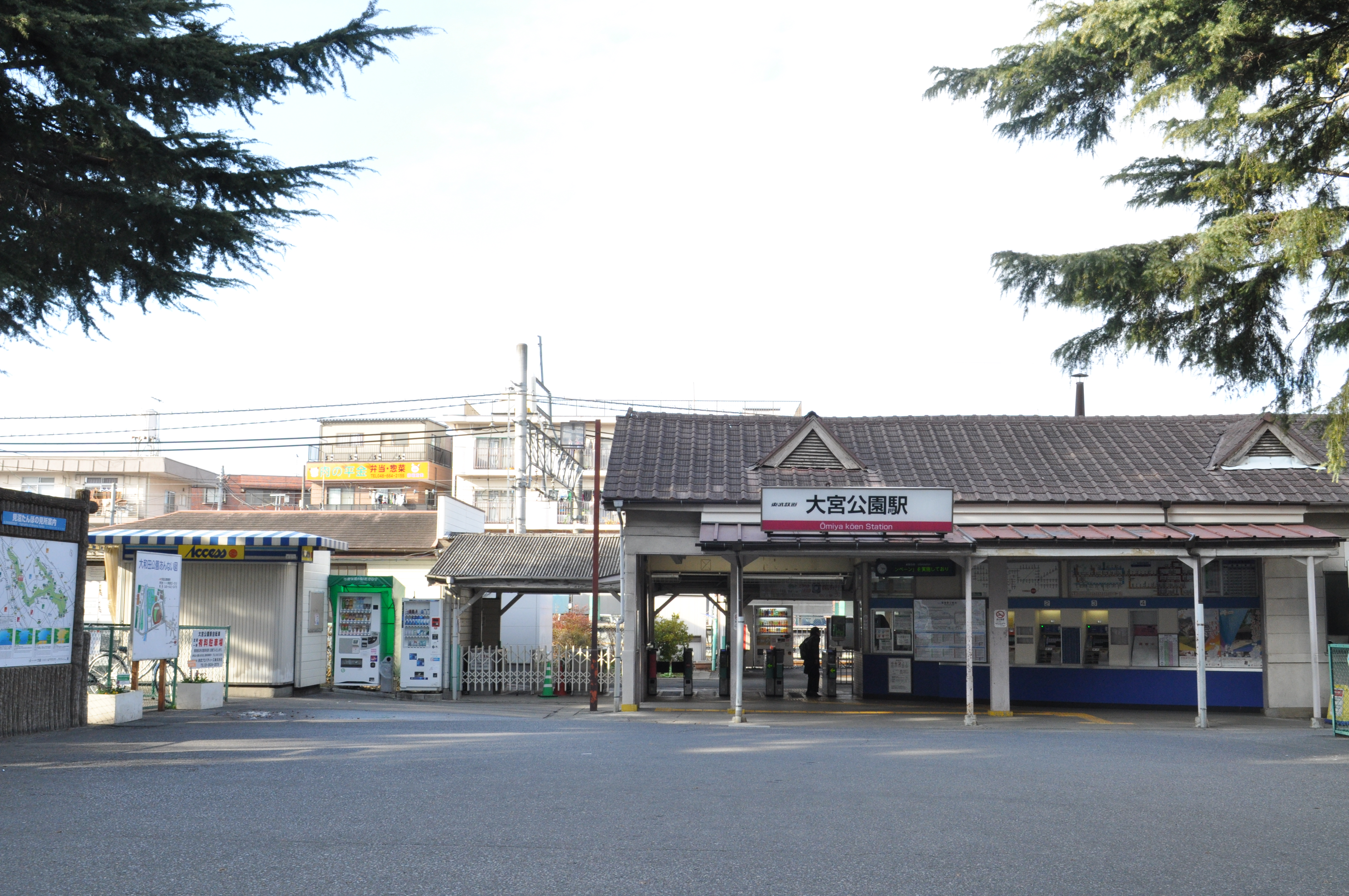
The station in 2013, before rebuilding

The station opened on 17 November 1929.

From 17 March 2012, station numbering was introduced on all Tōbu lines, with Ōmiya-kōen Station becoming "TD-03".

== Passenger statistics ==
In fiscal 2019, the station was used by an average of 9772 passengers daily.

== Surrounding area ==
- Ōmiya Park
- Hikawa Shrine

== See also ==
- List of railway stations in Japan
