= June 1914 =

Month of 1914

<<	June 1914					>>
Su	Mo	Tu	We	Th	Fr	Sa
	1	2	3	4	5	6
7	8	9	10	11	12	13
14	15	16	17	18	19	20
21	22	23	24	25	26	27
28	29	30

The following events occurred in June 1914:

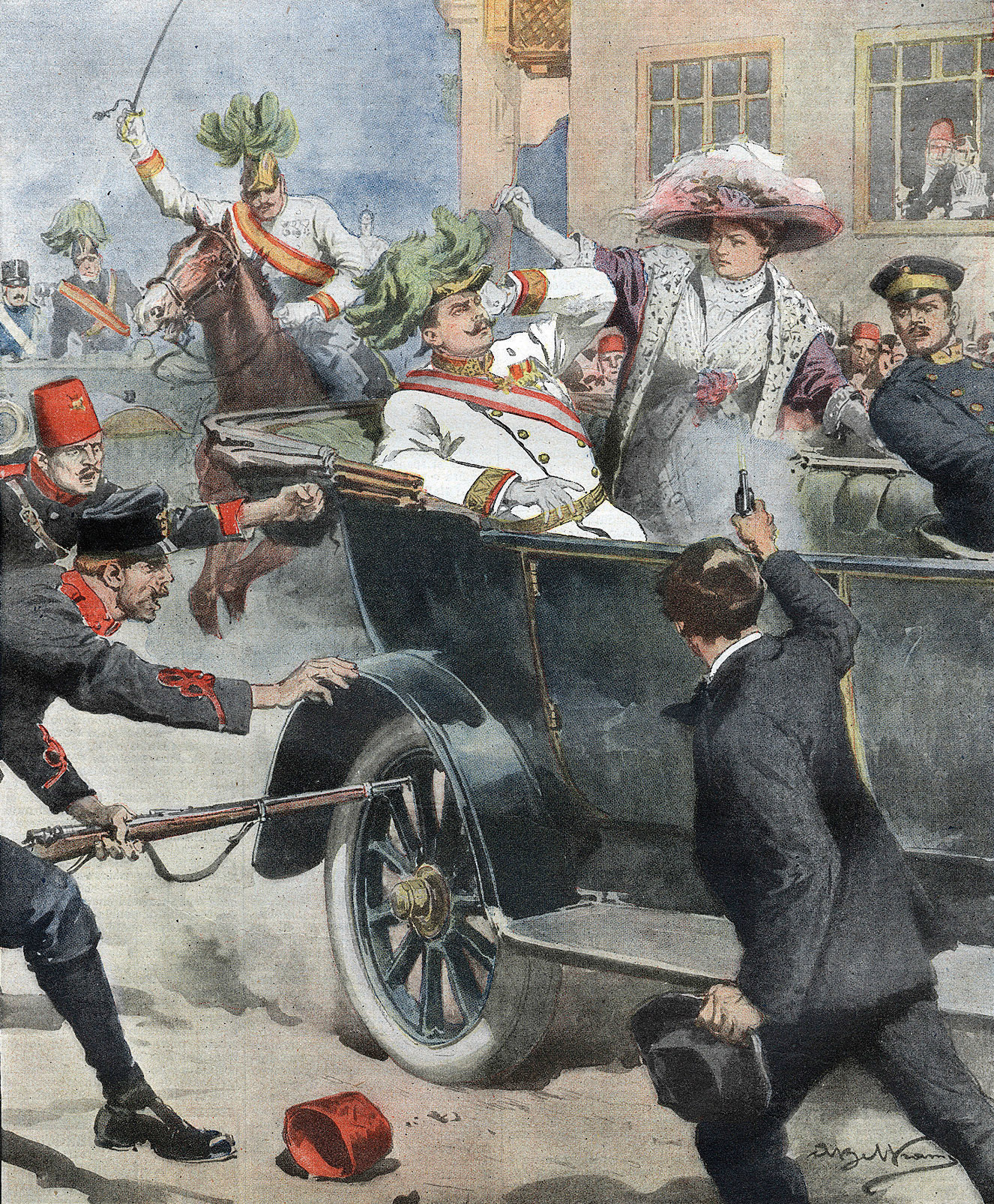
The first page of the edition of the Domenica del Corriere, an Italian paper, with a drawing by Achille Beltrame depicting Gavrilo Princip killing Archduke Francis Ferdinand of Austria in Sarajevo.

== June 1, 1914 (Monday) ==
- John Murphy Farley, Archbishop of New York, met with Pope Pius X. Concerns were made about the Pontiff's health, but Farley declared, "The Pope will undoubtedly live ten more years, with the same vigor, brightness, and profound intelligence." Pius would die less than three months later.
- Nineteen-year old Gavrilo Princip and 18-year old Trifko Grabež, Serbian nationalists recruited by the Black Hand to assassinate Archduke Franz Ferdinand of Austria, crossed over the Drina River from Serbia to Bosnia and Herzegovina.
- The Uetsu railroad was extended in Niigata Prefecture, Japan, with stations Kaji, Kanazuka, Kiyokawa, and Nakajō serving the line.
- The Palliser Hotel opened in downtown Calgary, and remains the Canadian city's oldest-operating luxury hotel.
- The association football club Americano was founded in Rio de Janeiro.
- Association football club Šamorín was established in Šamorín, Slovakia.
- The daily newspaper New India was established by Annie Besant in Madras to promote Indian independence.
- Born: Herbert Ihlefeld, German air force officer, commander of Jagdgeschwader 77 for the Luftwaffe during the Spanish Civil War and Jagdgeschwader 52 during World War II, recipient of the Spanish Cross and Knight's Cross of the Iron Cross; in Hohenselchow-Groß Pinnow (present-day Poland) (d. 1995)
- Died: Árpád Feszty, 57, Hungarian painter, known for historic and religious paintings such as Arrival of the Hungarians (b. 1856)

== June 2, 1914 (Tuesday) ==
- A major fire swept through Creagerstown, Maryland destroying about 30 buildings including the town hall, and causing somewhere between $60,000 and $70,000 worth of damages. A spark accidentally set off in the town's local creamery ignited the roof, and strong winds fanned the flames across the street and from roof to roof. The town had no fire department at the time to put out the fire. Despite rebuilding many homes in the following decade, the town never fully recovered from the disaster.
- The Nagoya Electric Rail Line was established in Gifu, Japan, with stations Chajo, Ginan, Kasamatsuguchi, and Kanō serving it.
- The association football club Rio Branco was founded in Fortaleza, Brazil, but one year later its name was changed to its current title Ceará.
- The village of Peace River Crossing was established, later renamed the town of Peace River, Alberta.

== June 3, 1914 (Wednesday) ==
- Kid Williams defeated Johnny Coulon by a third-round knockout at Vernon, California, to win the World Bantamweight Championship. He held onto the title until 1917.
- Danish composer Carl Nielsen premiered his quintet compositions Serenata in vano in Nykøbing Falster, Denmark.

== June 4, 1914 (Thursday) ==
- Thousands of Quebec City residents lined the streets for the funeral of 12 of the victims in the sinking of the RMS Empress of Ireland on May 29. A private funeral for Henry Seton-Karr was also held in the city, based on wishes that should he perish abroad, his remains should be interred where he died.
- U.S. President Woodrow Wilson unveiled the Confederate Memorial at the Arlington National Cemetery in Virginia.
- Finnish composer Jean Sibelius premiered his orchestral work The Oceanides at the Norfolk Chamber Music Festival to rave reviews.
- The City Island Ball Park opened in Daytona Beach, Florida. It was renamed after ball player Jackie Robinson in recognition of the city allowing him to be the first black player to spring train for a non-Negro base team in 1946.
- The sports club Surahammars was officially founded in Surahammar, Sweden, then offering ice hockey, bandy and association football. The club shifted their focus to ice hockey and began producing renowned hockey players such as Ronald Pettersson, Tommy Salo, and Stig-Göran Johansson.

== June 5, 1914 (Friday) ==
- The Salvation Army held a memorial in London for 159 members who died during the sinking of the RMS Empress of Ireland on May 29 (another eight had survived). An estimated 10,000 Salvation members attended the memorial in Royal Albert Hall.
- Barely a year after it was launched, the Russian Yiddish weekly newspaper Di Tsayt (The Times) was shut down by the Russian government, with the last paper distributed on June 5. However, journalists revived the paper again two weeks later under a different name Undzer Tsayt (Our Time) and lasted for another four weeks before it was shut down again.
- Born:
  - Estelle Reiner, American actress and singer, wife to Carl Reiner and mother of Rob Reiner, famous for delivering the punchline "I'll have what she's having" in When Harry Met Sally...; as Estelle Lebost, in New York City, United States (d. 2008)
  - Stan Jones, American songwriter, beat known for the country music hit "Ghost Riders in the Sky"; as Stanley Jones, in Douglas, Arizona, United States (d. 1963)

== June 6, 1914 (Saturday) ==
- Italian rider Alfonso Calzolari won the 6th Giro d'Italia cycling race in Milan, with fellow Italian riders Pierino Albini and Luigi Lucotti coming in second and third place respectively. It was one of the hardest races in the event's history, with only eight out of the original 81 contenders completing the race.
- American aviator Walter L. Brock won the London Aerial Derby by flying a Morane-Saulnier G. The Derby was originally scheduled on May 23 but delayed due to poor weather. British aviator Gustav Hamel was supposed to have competed in the aerial competition when he disappeared May 23 over the English Channel while practicing for the aerial competition.
- An estimated 60,000 schoolchildren and their parents attended Fenway Park in Boston to greet the circus elephants Mollie, Waddy and Tony that the children purchased for the Franklin Park Zoo by donating their savings of pennies, nickels and dimes. Along with the elephants, the event included clowns, acrobats, a marching band and a Theodore Roosevelt impersonator clad in a safari outfit.
- A group of Milwaukee entrepreneurs formed the American Metal Products Company (now Ampco Metal).
- Born:
  - Laurence Hyde, British-Canadian artist, known for works including Southern Cross; in Kingston upon Thames, London, England (d. 1987)
  - Elmer B. Staats, American public servant, 5th Comptroller General of the United States; in Richfield, Kansas, United States (d. 2011)
- Died: Theodore Watts-Dunton, 81, English critic and poet, major contributor to The Examiner and the Athenaeum magazine from 1875 until 1898, contributed the major article on Poetry in the ninth edition of the Encyclopædia Britannica (b. 1832)

== June 7, 1914 (Sunday) ==
- Red Week – Massive demonstrations of workers and peasants protesting militarism in Ancona and Marcas, Italy led to clashes with soldiers sent by the government to suppress them, resulting in the deaths of three protesters and more violence for seven days.
- Buckingham Palace in London was breached again, just weeks after British suffragists broke some of its windows. Henry Pike, a motor engineer, in the early morning hours managed to scale over the iron fence and slip past the palace guard before entering the palace through a basement window. Pike wandered through several chambers where he changed into the suit of one of palace's servants and stole a silver cigarette case and walking stick. He was apprehended by staff after wandering into one of the page's quarters and turned over to police. Pike said he had been drunk at the time he trespassed. The palace guard immediately ordered a review of its security procedures.
- The Bandon Halt railway station for the Brighton Line closed in London.
- The film drama The Wrath of the Gods, directed by Reginald Barker, was the first major American film to feature a cross-cultural love story — between an American sailor (Frank Borzage) and the daughter of a Japanese noble (Tsuru Aoki). The film's criticism of traditional Japanese culture resulted in the film being banned after its premier in Japan in 1918.
- The association football club Académico de Viseu was established in Viseu, Portugal.
- Born:
  - Khwaja Ahmad Abbas, Indian film director, known for award-winning films such as Shehar Aur Sapna and Saat Hindustani; in Panipat, British India (present-day India) (d. 1987)
  - George Juskalian, American army officer, four-time recipient of the Bronze Star Medal, two-time recipient of the Silver Star, Legion of Merit and Air Medal for commands in World War II, Korean War and Vietnam War; in Fitchburg, Massachusetts, United States (d. 2010)

== June 8, 1914 (Monday) ==
- German ocean liner Victoria Luise ran aground in the mouth of the river Elbe where she listed. She was later repaired and re-floated.
- Two of Brazil's most prominent sports organizations, the Brazilian Football Confederation and the Brazilian Olympic Committee were both founded on the same day.
- The first meeting of The Girl Guides Association of Trinidad and Tobago was held at the Saint Ann's Church hall on Oxford Street, Port of Spain by the wife of the church's Methodist minister. By Christmas of that year, there were four companies with a total of 100 Guides and nine leaders. The national chapter became a full member of World Association of Girl Guides and Girl Scouts in 1963 and now serves over 3,000 members.

== June 9, 1914 (Tuesday) ==
- Militant suffragette Bertha Ryland slashed a painting in Birmingham Art Gallery to publicise the cause for women's suffrage.
- The USS Zeppelin was launched by Bremer Vulkan at Bremen-Vegesack, Germany. Initially designed to be a passenger cruise ship, the USS Zeppelin was commissioned as a troop ship in 1915 during World War I. She resumed as a cruise ship under the United Kingdom in 1920.
- The Royal Navy ship HMS Gorgon was launched by Armstrong Whitworth from Elswick, Tyne and Wear in England, initially as a coastal defense ship for the Royal Norwegian Navy. She was repurchased and re-outfitted by the Royal Navy during the final month of World War I.
- Using a ramp constructed over the foredeck of the seaplane tender Foudre, French Navy Lieutenant de Vaisseau Jean de Laborde attempted France's second airplane takeoff from a ship and the first by a French naval aviator, but crashed.
- Pittsburgh Pirate Honus Wagner became the first baseball player in the 20th century with 3000 career hits.
- Born: Dietrich Peltz, German air force officer, commander of the 9th, 2nd, and 1st Air Corps of the Luftwaffe and the youngest general officer of the Wehrmacht during World War II, recipient of the Knight's Cross of the Iron Cross; in Gera, German Empire (present-day Germany) (d. 2001)

== June 10, 1914 (Wednesday) ==
- In the Zaian War, a French force of 14,000 men under command of General Paul Prosper Henrys began an assault on Khenifra, Morocco, the stronghold of Mouha ou Hammou Zayani, leader of the Zaian Confederation.
- The American racing yacht Resolute beat competitors Vanitie and Defiance in selection trials for the America's Cup with a course record of 30 miles in 3:16:41. However, the outbreak of World War I caused the races to be postponed, and the America Cup competition did not resume until 1920.
- Born:
  - Trammell Crow, American real estate developer, credited with creating major real estate projects including the Dallas Market Center, Peachtree Center in Atlanta, and the Embarcadero Center in San Francisco; as Fred Trammell Crow, in Dallas, United States (d. 2009)
  - Ivy May Pearce, Australian pilot, first woman in the southern hemisphere to earn a pilot's licence; in Ipswich, Queensland, Australia (d. 1998)
- Died: Willie Hammerstein, 38, American manager of the Victoria Theatre on Times Square in Manhattan, and father to Oscar Hammerstein II, died of kidney disease. (b. 1874)

== June 11, 1914 (Thursday) ==
- The United States Senate passed a repeal of the provision in the Panama Canal Act that exempted American vessels from tolls by a vote of 50–35.
- Kermit Roosevelt, son of U.S. President Theodore Roosevelt married Belle Wyatt Willard, a daughter of the U.S. Ambassador to Spain, at a ceremony in Madrid.
- The Keiō railroad was extended in Tokyo with stations Hatsudai serving the line.
- Born:
  - Gerald Mohr, American radio and film actor, made more than 500 appearances in radio roles throughout the 1930s, 1940s and early 1950s; in New York City, United States (d. 1968)
  - Jeanette Williams, American politician and women's rights activist, served on the Seattle City Council from 1969 to 1989; as Alice Jeanette Klemptner, in Seattle, United States (d. 2008)

== June 12, 1914 (Friday) ==
- Some 100 Ottoman Greeks in Phocaea were massacred by Turkish irregular troops.
- The cabinet under French Prime Minister Alexandre Ribot dissolved almost on the same day it was formed, after the Chamber of Deputies refused to pass a vote of confidence.
- In the Zaian War, French forces entered Khenifra, Morocco, but found it had been abandoned by the Zaian Confederation.
- The oldest message in a bottle, according to Guinness World Records, was a scientific message in a drift bottle released by a sea captain for the Fishery Board for Scotland at 60 14.00'N 002 22.00'W. It was recovered by a fishing vessel at 59 33.60'N 002 04.20'W on July 25, 2013, 99 years and 43 days after its release.
- Association football club Sansinena was established in Bahía Blanca Partido, Argentina.
- The Town of Coolangatta was established in Queensland, Australia.
- Born:
  - Go Seigen, Chinese-Japanese master of the ancient Chinese game of Go; in Minhou County, Fujian, Republic of China (present-day China) (d. 2014)
  - Bill Kenny, American singer, best known as front man for The Ink Spots; in Philadelphia, United States (d. 1978)

== June 13, 1914 (Saturday) ==
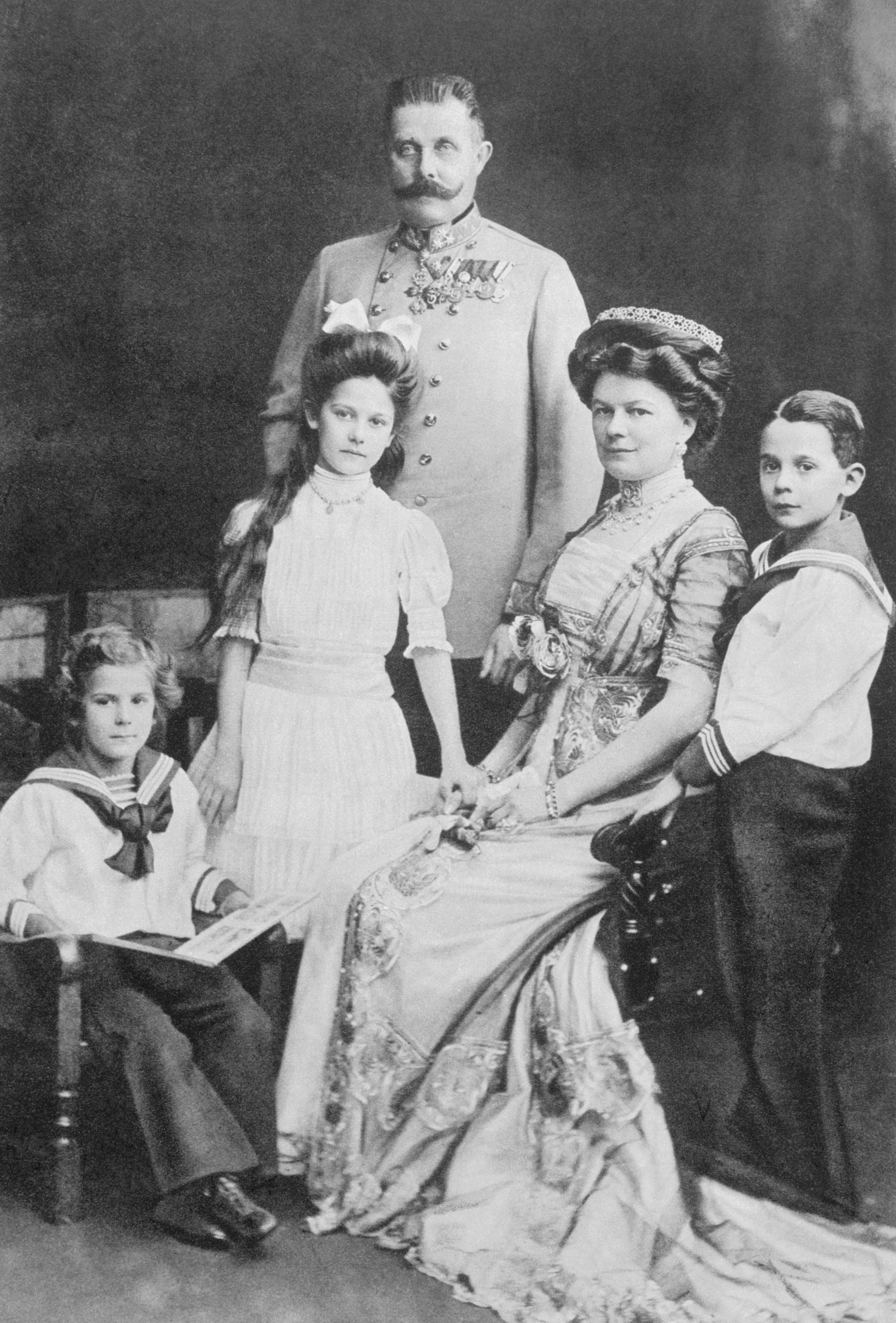
Archduke Franz Ferdinand of Austria with his wife Sophie, Duchess of Hohenberg and their three children

- Kaiser Wilhelm of Germany concluded his visit with Archduke Franz Ferdinand after they discussed the tenuous balance of power in the Balkans, as the Archduke was scheduled later that month to visit military expansion efforts in the region.
- René Viviani was appointed to become the 81st Prime Minister of France after receiving a vote of confidence of 370 to 137 by the French National Assembly.
- Riots broke out during a Miners Day Parade in Butte, Montana, stemming from long-time feuding between the locale leadership of the Western Federation of Miners and dissident union members.
- American tennis champion Mary Browne defeated Marie Wagner 6–2, 1–6, 6–1 to win her third women's singles during the U.S. National Championships.
- Australasian Films released its first film feature The Shepherd of the Southern Cross which starred Vera Pearce as a noblewoman caught in a love triangle while in Australia. Unfortunately, the film was a box office failure and film director Cosens Spencer was forced to leave the company. The film is now considered lost.

== June 14, 1914 (Sunday) ==
- Red Week – Order was mostly restored in Ancona and other Italian cities after a week of civil unrest following protests against alleged militarism in Italy's government.
- Austro-Hungarian foreign minister Leopold Berchtold released a memo suggesting the end of Serbia as a nation was necessary to preserve the balance of power in the Balkans.
- The First Presbyterian Church was established in Madison, Nebraska.
- California Governor Hiram Johnson publicly unveiled a monument in tribute to the Bear Flag Revolt before a crowd of 5,000 people in Sonoma, California.
- Association football club América was established in Joinville, Brazil, becoming the five time state champion of Santa Catarina.
- Association football club Democrata was founded in Sete Lagoas, Brazil.
- The comic strip The Teenie Weenies debuted in the Chicago Tribune.
- Born:
  - Rupert Bruce-Mitford, British archaeologist, leading researcher on the Sutton Hoo ship burial site at Woodbridge, Suffolk, England; in Streatham, London, England (d. 1994)
  - Winifred Milius Lubell, American artist and writer, known for works including The Metamorphosis of Baubo and The Outer Lands; as Winifred Milius, in New York City, United States (d. 2012)
- Died: Adlai E. Stevenson, 78, the 23rd Vice President of the United States from 1893 to 1897 (b. 1835)

== June 15, 1914 (Monday) ==
- Fourteen people died in Paris, most of them public workers, when a massive thunderstorm overwhelmed the city's storm sewer system and caused major flooding in the streets.
- Zaian War – French forces repelled further attacks from the Zayanes around Khenifra in Morocco.
- The 13th session of the Legislative Assembly of Manitoba was dissolved for provincial elections.
- Major Lodewijk Thomson of the International Gendarmerie, law enforcement agency of the Principality of Albania, was killed by a suspected sniper during fighting around the port of Durrës, the first time a Dutch soldier was killed during a peacekeeping mission.
- The Northern Rail Line in Thailand added new stations including Ban Pin, Ban Thung Lo, and Prachuap Khiri Khan.
- James Joyce's short story anthology The Dubliners was published in London, with the collection including "Araby" and "The Dead".

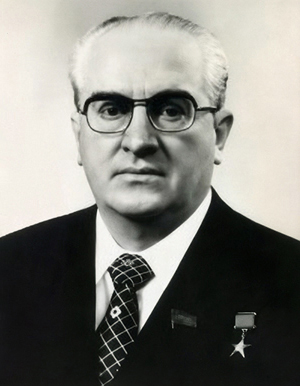
Yuri Andropov

- Born:
  - Yuri Andropov, de facto leader of the Soviet Union from 1982 to 1984 as the General Secretary of the Communist Party of the Soviet Union; in Stavropol, Russian Empire (present-day Russia) (d. 1984)
  - Saul Steinberg, Romanian-born American cartoonist and illustrator, best known for his work View of the World from 9th Avenue in The New Yorker; in Râmnicu Sărat, Kingdom of Romania (present-day Romania) (d. 1999)
  - Terence Otway, British military officer, commanded the paratroop assault on the Merville Gun Battery on D-Day; in Cairo, Khedivate of Egypt (present-day Egypt) (d. 2006)

== June 16, 1914 (Tuesday) ==
- Fourth Battle of Topolobampo — Mexican federal gunboat Guerrero clashed with the mutinous Tampico gunboat, now with the Constitutionalists, in the Gulf of California off the shore of Topolobampo, Mexico. The Guerrero was able to hit the deck of Tampico and cause it to catch fire, forcing Captain Hilario Malpica of the Tampico to order the ship to be abandoned while under the cover fire of the gunboat's last operating deck gun. Nearby U.S. naval ships observing the battle — USS New Orleans and USS Preble — picked up six of the surviving crew while Guerrero captured the rest as they fled in lifeboats. Rather than surrender, Malpica shot himself. In total, five Tampico men including Malpica died in the battle, and another 30 crew were wounded. The ship itself completely sank by midnight.
- A Commission of Inquiry on the collision between the ocean liner RMS Empress of Ireland and the Norwegian collier SS Storstad that resulted in the liner sinking began in Quebec City. The inquiry was presided over by Lord Bigham, who also presided over the official inquiry in the sinking of the RMS Titanic.
- Indian nationalist Bal Gangadhar Tilak was released from prison in Mandalay, Burma after serving a six-year sentence for sedition.
- Born: Larbi Benbarek, Moroccan footballer, first successful African player to play in Europe; as Haj Abdelkader Larbi Ben M'barek, in Casablanca, French Morocco (present-day Morocco) (d. 1992)

== June 17, 1914 (Wednesday) ==
- Bai Lang Rebellion — Rebel bandit leader Bai Lang, nicknamed by foreign press as the "White Wolf", broke through a blockade of 5,000 Chinese Army regulars with 1,000 of his men in the mountains south of Lanzhou, Gansu, China.
- The British hospital ship RFA Maine ran aground in thick fog off the coast of Isle of Mull, Scotland. All crew were rescued but the damage was too great for repair, and the ship was sold as scrap in July.
- The Tōbu Tōjō railroad was extended in Saitama Prefecture, Japan, with stations Kami-Itabashi and Shingashi serving the line.
- Born: John Hersey, American journalist and writer, credited as one of the developers of New Journalism, author of Hiroshima and The Call, recipient of the Pulitzer Prize for "A Bell for Adano"; in Tientsin, Republic of China (present-day China) (d. 1993)

== June 18, 1914 (Thursday) ==
- Bai Lang Rebellion — Rebel bandit leader Bai Lang, the "White Wolf" of China, was reported to have massacred over 10,000 inhabitants in the town of Taochau south of Lanzhou one day after escaping federal soldiers, according to a telegraph report from local missionaries to the Chinese government.
- A railway bridge collapse at Carrbridge in Scotland following a torrential thunderstorm killed five people.
- King Victor Emmanuel founded the Colonial Order of the Star of Italy to be awarded to soldiers and officers with exceptional military service in Italy's North African colonies (disbanded in 1943).
- Born:
  - E. G. Marshall, American actor, best known for film such as "Juror #4" in 12 Angry Men and the television medical dramas The Defenders and The Bold Ones: The New Doctors; as Everett Eugene Grunz, in Owatonna, Minnesota, United States (d. 1998)
  - Efraín Huerta, Mexican poet, known for poetry collections including Los hombres del alba and Los poemas de viaje; as Efrén Huerta Roma, in Silao, Mexico (d. 1982)

== June 19, 1914 (Friday) ==
- A coal mine explosion in Hillcrest, Alberta killed 189 of 235 miners, the worst mining disaster in Canadian history.
- The Indiana University School of Nursing was established.
- English golfer Harry Vardon won his sixth Open Championship at the Prestwick Golf Club in Scotland, three strokes ahead of runner-up John Henry Taylor, the defending champion. It would be the last tournament played until the end of World War I.
- The eighth Land of Oz book written by L. Frank Baum, Tik-Tok of Oz, was published. The book actually has little to do with Tik-Tok and was primarily the quest of the Shaggy Man (introduced in The Road to Oz) to rescue his brother, and his resulting conflict with the Nome King. The first edition was famous for showing the first maps of Oz in the endpapers.
- The Chatham rail station for the NJ Transit Morristown Line was opened in Chatham Borough, New Jersey.
- Born:
  - Alan Cranston, American politician, U.S. Senator from California from 1969 to 1993; in Palo Alto, California, United States (d. 2000)
  - Morgan Morgan-Giles, British naval officer and politician, commander of HMS Belfast and Royal Naval College, recipient of the Distinguished Service Order, Order of the British Empire, and George Medal; in Newton Abbot, England (d. 2013)
- Died: Brandon Thomas, 65, British actor and playwright, author of the popular farce Charley's Aunt (b. 1848)

== June 20, 1914 (Saturday) ==
- General elections were held in Fiji.
- The German ocean liner SS Bismarck was launched at the Blohm & Voss shipbuilders in Hamburg, Germany, with the christening done by Countess Hanna von Bismarck, the granddaughter of the 19th century German Chancellor Otto von Bismarck, and Kaiser Wilhelm.
- While the Austro-Hungarian airship Militärluftschiff III (or M.III) hovered over Fischamend testing new camera equipment, an Austro-Hungarian Army pilot tried to loop M.III in a Farman biplane. The airplane struck the top of the airship, tearing a hole and igniting the escaping hydrogen gas. Both aircraft were destroyed, and both men in the airplane and all seven men aboard M.III were killed. It was the end of the Austro-Hungarian airship program.
- The main campus opened at the University of Southampton.
- The first issue of the Vorticist literary magazine Blast edited by Wyndham Lewis, was published, although distribution was delayed until July 2.
- Born:
  - Jane du Pont Lunger, American socialite, sixth generation member of the Du Pont family, who, with her husband Harry Lunger bred and raced 45 thoroughbred winners in Christiana, Delaware; as Jane du Pont, in Wilmington, Delaware, United States (d. 2001)
  - Albrecht Brandi, German naval officer, commander of various U-boats including U-617 during World War II, recipient of the Knight's Cross of the Iron Cross; in Dortmund, German Empire (present-day Germany) (d. 1966)

== June 21, 1914 (Sunday) ==
- Serbian diplomat Jovan Jovanović Pižon warned Austrian finance minister Leon Biliński of intelligence reports suggesting there may be an assassination plot against Archduke Franz Ferdinand when he visited Sarajevo next week, but his warnings were ignored.
- Around 3,000 to 4,000 miners met and formed a new union against the Western Federation of Miners in Butte, Montana. The union had leaders associated with the Industrial Workers of the World, and many of the new union members harassed and assaulted miners who still retained membership with the old union.
- Twelve people drowned, including seven children, in a boating accident near Syracuse, New York when a motor boat using one the New York state canals hit a snag and capsized.
- The Miyagi railroad opened in Kyushu, Japan, with stations Kumamoto, Minami, Suizenji, Tatsutaguchi, Sanrigi, and Higo-Ōzu serving the line.
- Born: William Vickrey, Canadian economist, recipient of the 1996 Nobel Memorial Prize in Economic Sciences; in Victoria, British Columbia, Canada (d. 1996)
- Died: Bertha von Suttner, 71, Czech-Austrian writer and pacifist and the first woman to be the recipient of the Nobel Peace Prize (b. 1843)

== June 22, 1914 (Monday) ==
- The Million Dollar Mystery, the first of a 23-part serial film directed by Howell Hansel, and starring Florence La Badie and James Cruze, was released and would gross $1.5M at the box office.
- Born: Myer Feldman, American lawyer and public servant, White House Counsel for U.S. Presidents John F. Kennedy and Lyndon B. Johnson; in Philadelphia, United States (d. 2007)

== June 23, 1914 (Tuesday) ==
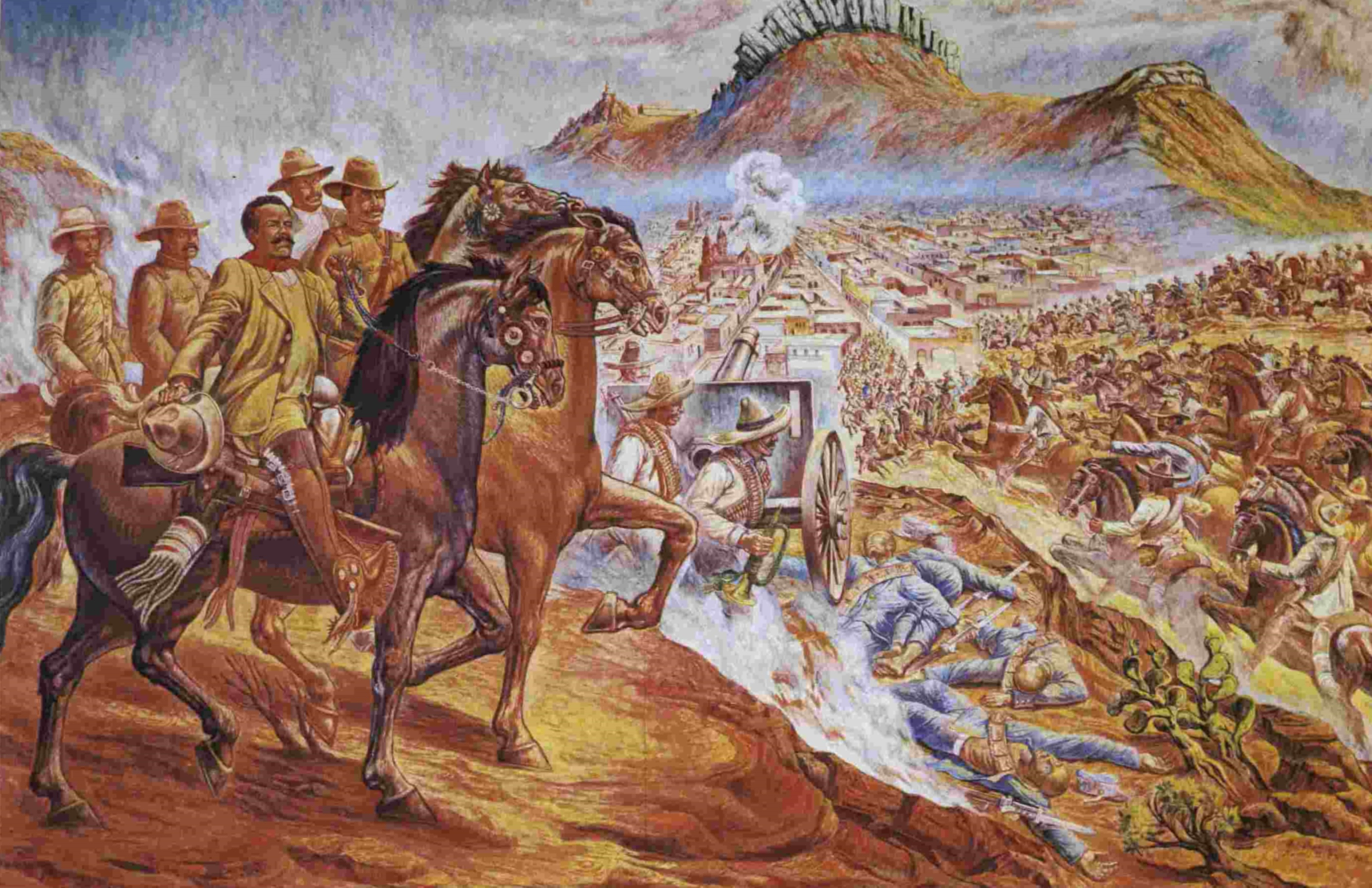
Artistic representation of Pancho Villa and the División del Norte at the Battle of Zacatecas.

- Battle of Zacatecas – Pancho Villa and his División del Norte (Division of the North) decisively defeated the troops of General Luís Medina Barrón defending the town of Zacatecas City. After bombarding the town, Villa's troop surrounded and stormed the town from all sides. After losing key areas, Barrón ordered his men to retreat to neighboring Guadalupe and meet up with reinforcements. However, 7,000 rebel militia blocked their way and slaughtered the federal troops. An estimated 6,000 to 7,000 defenders were killed or wounded, with only Barrón and a few hundred men escaping. About 1,500 of Villa's men were wounded and another 700 were killed. Nonetheless, the great victory demoralized Huerta's supporters and lead to his resignation on July 15.
- The Assembly of Delvino was established in Delvino, Albania as a representative body of the Autonomous Republic of Northern Epirus.
- A tornado ripped through Watertown, South Dakota, killing nine people and injuring 40 more, and destroying over 300 buildings.
- A mob surrounded the Western Federation of Miners office in Butte, Montana where national president Charles Moyer was present to negotiate and end of labor unrest. The resulting violence ended in two deaths and the office building being dynamited, although Moyer and his staff managed to escape.
- The first flight of the flying boat America, which businessman Rodman Wanamaker had ordered with a goal of sponsoring the first transatlantic flight, occurred at Hammondsport, New York. However, the outbreak of World War I five weeks later prevented the transatlantic attempt from taking place.
- The Kiel Canal in Schleswig-Holstein, Germany was reopened after seven years of work to deepen and widen the canal for modern naval ships. The British Fleet under Sir George Warrender visited as the Kaiser inspected the dreadnought HMS King George V.
- Died: Bhaktivinoda Thakur, 75, Indian philosopher, member of the Bengali Renaissance and the school of Achintya Bheda Abheda philosophy (b. 1838)

== June 24, 1914 (Wednesday) ==
- Austria-Hungary prepared a letter for its ally Germany stating Romania could no longer be considered a reliable ally in addressing political issues in the Balkans, following the June 14 summit in Constanța, Romania. At the summit, Russia had begun working on forming an alliance with Romania, Bulgaria, Serbia, Greece and Montenegro against Austria-Hungary. To counter this, Austria-Hungary recommended the empire, Germany, the Ottoman Empire and Bulgaria should form an alliance against Russia. Unfortunately, the letter was delayed with the assassination of Archduke Franz Ferdinand.
- German aviator Gustav Basser set a new flight endurance record, flying nonstop for 18 hours 10 minutes at Johannistal, Germany.
- Edward Thomas made the English railway journey which inspired his poem "Adlestrop" en route to meet Robert Frost. His journey and visit with Frost convinced Thomas to begin writing poetry for the first time after that summer.
- Born:
  - Pearl Witherington, British spy, leader of the Wrestler Network in central France during World War II; in Paris, France (d. 2008)
  - Jan Karski, Polish partisan fighter, member of the Service for Poland's Victory during World War II; as Jan Kozielewski, in Łódź, Congress Poland, Russian Empire (present-day Poland) (d. 2000)

== June 25, 1914 (Thursday) ==
- A magnitude 7.6 earthquake struck off the southwestern coast of Sumatra, Indonesia, creating a tsunami that killed 20 people and injured another 20. A few homes were destroyed in the area.
- A series of chemical explosions in a leather factory started a massive fire that swept downtown Salem, Massachusetts, destroying 1,376 buildings at an estimated cost of US$15 million, and left some 20,000 people homeless.
- Canadian Arctic Expedition – George Breddy, a fireman for the sunken HMCS Karluk and one of the remaining survivors on Wrangel Island in the Bering Sea was found dead in his tent by a gunshot wound. The expedition group were uncertain whether the death was suicide or murder, but Breddy had been accused of stealing possessions and hoarding food rations from others in the group, and some missing items were found on him. While some members had accused Karluk's second engineer of murdering Breddy, there was no conclusive proof. Of the 25 expedition members accounted for when the Karluk sank in January, there were now only 14 left on Wrangel Island.
- The H.B. Claflin & Company, a dry good retailer in New York City, went into receivership by court order.
- The Aalesunds association football club was founded in Ålesund, Norway.
- Died: Georg II, Duke of Saxe-Meiningen, 88, German noble, patron to the Meiningen Ensemble and the Meiningen Court Orchestra (b. 1826)

== June 26, 1914 (Friday) ==
- U.S. forces landed in the Dominican Republic to protect the port of Puerto Plata during the height of country's civil war.
- The Senate for the Union of South Africa passed the Indian Relief Bill which abolished a tax against Indian citizens, legally recognized Indian ceremonial marriages, relaxed immigration laws, and pardoned all members of the Indian resistance movement. With the bill passed into law, resistance leader Mahatma Gandhi suspended the movement.
- Born:
  - Laurie Lee, English author, best known for autobiographical works such as Cider with Rosie; as Laurence Lee, in Stroud, Gloucestershire, England (d. 1997)
  - Lyman Spitzer, American physicist, conceived the idea of telescopes operating in outer space; in Toledo, Ohio, United States (d. 1997)
  - Shapour Bakhtiar, Iranian state leader, 45th Prime Minister of Iran; in Shahrekord, Guarded Domains of Iran (present-day Shahr-e Kord, Iran) (assassinated, 1991)
  - Princess Sophie, Greek noble, daughter of Prince Andrew of Greece and Denmark; in Mon Repos, Corfu, Greece (d. 2001)
- Died: Antonio Herrera Toro, 57, Venezuelan painter known for portraits of South American war hero Simón Bolívar (b. 1857)

== June 27, 1914 (Saturday) ==
- U.S. presidential adviser Edward M. House met with British Foreign Secretary Edward Grey in London as part of the U.S. mission to persuade Great Britain and Germany to join the United States in a diplomatic alliance to preserve peace in Europe, especially in the face of Germany's growing militarization. House advised Grey "the kaiser himself and most of his immediate advisers did not want war because they wished Germany to expand commercially and grow in wealth, but the army was militarily aggressive and ready for war at any time." Both concluded the meeting: "Neither England, Germany, Russia, nor France desire war."
- Assassination of Archduke Franz Ferdinand – Danilo Ilić, a member of the secret Serbian military society Black Hand, distributed pistols, bombs and cyanide pills to six assassins that would be placed along the procession route Archduke Franz Ferdinand would take when he carried out military inspections the next day in Sarajevo.
- The Westralian Farmers Co‐operative Limited was established as a cooperative for farmers in Western Australia, eventually becoming the Australian conglomerate Wesfarmers.
- Born:
  - Charles Thurstan Shaw, British archaeologist, leader research in ancient West African cultures in present-day Ghana and Nigeria; in Plymouth, England (d. 2013)
  - Robert Aickman, British conservationist and author, co-founder of the Inland Waterways Association; in London, England (d. 1981)

== June 28, 1914 (Sunday) ==
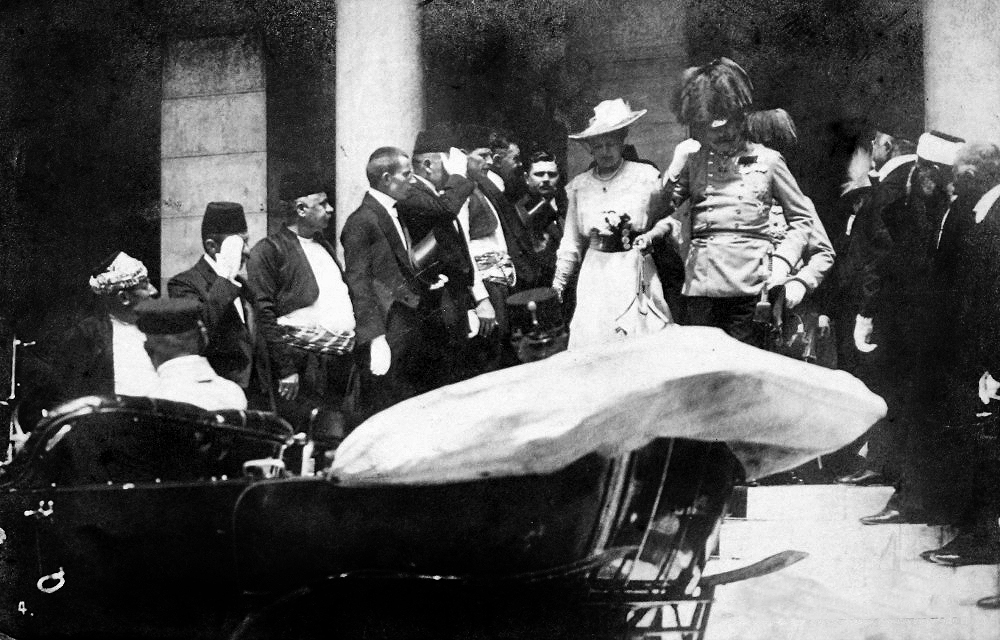
The Archduke and his wife just before the assassination.

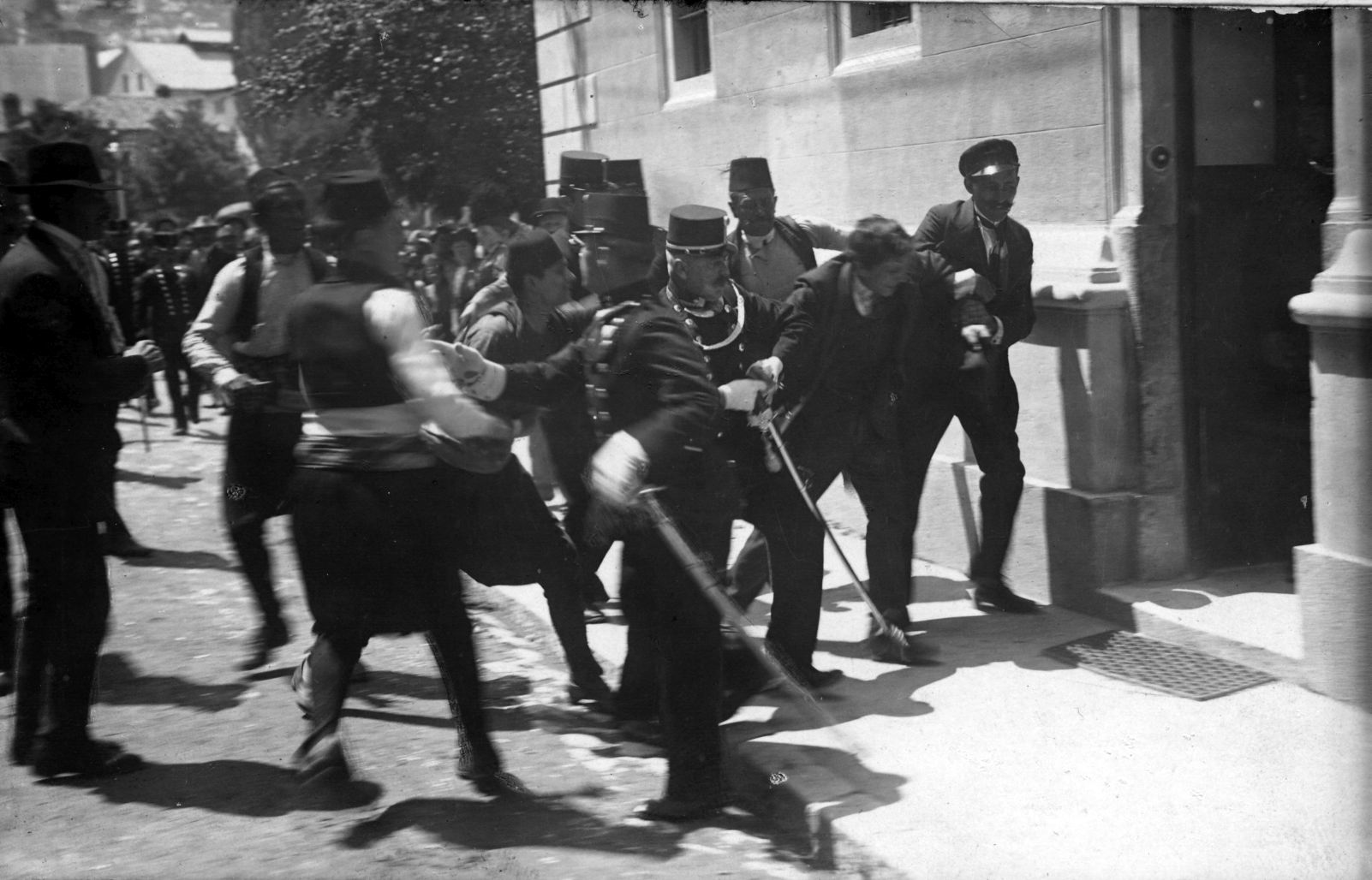
This picture of the arrest of a suspect in Sarajevo is usually associated with the arrest of Gavrilo Princip, although some believe it depicts Ferdinand Behr, a bystander.

- Assassination of Archduke Franz Ferdinand – Archduke Franz Ferdinand of Austria, his wife Sophie, Duchess of Hohenberg and his party traveled by train from Ilidža to Sarajevo where they were met by Bosnia and Herzegovina Governor Oskar Potiorek. The schedule was to include a military inspection at the city's barracks and a meeting with dignitaries at Sarajevo's Town Hall.
  - Nedeljko Čabrinović made the first assassination attempt on the Archduke by throwing a bomb at the convertible he and his wife Sophie were riding in (two other fellow assassins Muhamed Mehmedbašić and Vaso Čubrilović were on the motorcade route with pistols but failed to act). The bomb bounced off the folded back cover and exploded underneath another vehicle in the motorcade, wounding around 20 people. Čabrinović swallowed a cyanide tablet and jumped off a bridge into the Miljacka River to avoid capture, but the pill only induced vomiting and the water was too shallow. He was immediately arrested. In spite of the assassination attempt, the procession continued on to Sarajevo's Town Hall.
  - Gavrilo Princip assassinated the Archduke and his wife, Sophie after they left Sarajevo's Town Hall. Princip was able to get close to the Archduke when his motorcade became trapped in a dead-end after taking a wrong turn. He shot the Austrian noble in the neck and Sophie in the abdomen as she tried to shield her husband. Princip was immediately arrested, and both the Archduke and his wife were taken back to the town hall for medical treatment. Both died of their injuries, with Sophie on arrival at town hall and Ferdinand around 10 minutes after.
- Anti-Serb riots in Sarajevo – Following news of Archduke Franz Ferdinand's assassination, violent pogroms were organized against ethnic Serbs in Austria-Hungary. Anti-Serbian mobs ransacked homes and businesses of prominent Serbians, including a mob of 200 people that attacked and destroyed the Hotel Europa, the largest hotel in Sarajevo, as it was owned by Serb merchant Gligorije Jeftanović. Two Serbians were killed in the violence.
- The British steamer SS California ran aground on Tory Island off the north-west coast of Ireland in dense fog with over 1,000 passengers on board. Three British warships including the destroyer Swift, as well as the ocean liner Cassandra, rescued the stranded passengers. The ship was repaired and returned to duty within the year.
- The 12th Tour de France began in Paris, with a total distance of 5,405 kilometres (3,359 mi) for cyclists to cover at an average speed of 26.835 kilometres per hour (16.674 mph).
- The Argentinian association football club Ferrocarril was founded in Libertad, Buenos Aires, Argentina.
- The association football club Sereď was established in Sereď, Slovakia.
- The music conservatory Darülbedayi was founded in Constantinople. It later evolved in the live theater company Istanbul City Theatres in 1934.
- Born:
  - Aribert Heim, Austrian physician and Schutzstaffel (SS) officer who committed medical atrocities at the Mauthausen concentration camp during The Holocaust and was referred to as "Dr. Death"; in Bad Radkersburg, Austria-Hungary (present-day Austria) (d. 1992)
  - Valerian Trifa, Romanian cleric and, archbishop of the American Orthodox Church during 1950s and 1960s, known for having controversial connections to Nazi Germany; in Câmpeni, Austria-Hungary (present-day Romania) (d. 1987)
- Died: Camillo Boito, 77, Italian architect and engineer, most known for the restoration of the Church and Campanile of Santi Maria e Donato at Murano, Italy (b. 1836)
- Charles Lundene, 49, Swedish sailor, died of the plague at New Orleans, USA (b. 1865)

== June 29, 1914 (Monday) ==
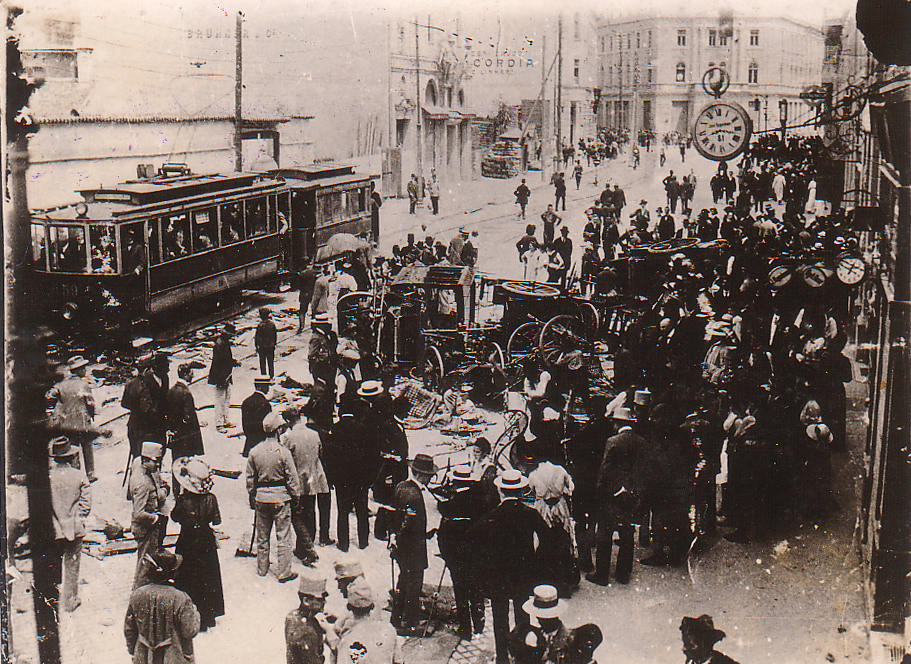
Anti-Serbian rioting breaks out in Sarajevo, June 29, 1914.

- Anti-Serb riots in Sarajevo – Governor of Bosnia and Herzegovina Oskar Potiorek declared a state of siege in Sarajevo as violent pogroms were carried out against ethnic Serbians. Over 1,000 Serbian homes, businesses and churches were vandalized with little or no intervention by law enforcement. Order was not fully restored until the bodies of Archduke Franz Ferdinand of Austria and Sophie, Duchess of Hohenberg were transported by train out of the city.
- Assassination of Archduke Franz Ferdinand – During police interrogation, both Gavrilo Princip and Nedeljko Čabrinović confessed to conspiring with members of the Black Hand to assassinate the Archduke. A police dragnet arrested most of the conspirators, with 25 going to trial later that year.
- U.S. President Woodrow Wilson sent a telegram to Austrian Emperor Franz Joseph: "Deeply shocked of the atrocious murder of his Imperial and Royal Highness Archduke Franz Ferdinand and his consort at an assassin's hands. I extend to your Majesty, and to the royal family, and to the Government of Austria-Hungary the sincere condolences of the Government and people of the United States and an expression of my profound sympathy."
- Austro-Hungarian Foreign Minister Leopold Berchtold and Chief of the General Staff Franz Conrad von Hötzendorf debated the appropriate response to the events in Sarajevo, with Conrad advocating mobilization against Serbia. Berchtold opposed this, saying that public opinion must first be prepared, and suggested the following day that Serbia disbanding anti-Austrian societies and relieving certain officials of their duties for their bad acts may help ease tensions.
- The Conservatives led by James Whitney won a fourth consecutive majority in the Ontario general election. However, his administration was short-lived, as Whitney died in office three months later.
- Khioniya Guseva, a resident of Syzran, Russia attempted and failed to assassinate Grigori Rasputin at his home town in Siberia. She stabbed him in the abdomen as he left his home but the notorious "mad monk" was able to fight her off until a crowd intervened, forcing her to turn herself in to the town constable. She was declared insane by the courts and committed to an asylum in Tomsk until 1917.
- The International Exhibition opened at the "White City", Ashton Gate, Bristol, England. It closed on August 15 and the site was used as a military depot.
- The maiden trip on the Portland–Lewiston Interurban was made when the car Arbutus carried an inspection trip from Lewiston to Portland, Maine.
- Born:
  - Rafael Kubelík, Czech conductor, debuted with the Czech Philharmonic before defecting in 1948, conducted for various orchestras, most notable Bavarian Radio Symphony Orchestra from 1961 to 1979; in Býchory, Bohemia, Austria-Hungary (present-day Czech Republic) (d. 1996)
  - Les Clisby, Australian flying officer, commander of No. 1 Squadron during World War II, recipient of the Distinguished Flying Cross; as Leslie Clisby, in McLaren Vale, South Australia, Australia (killed in action during the Battle of France, 1940)

== June 30, 1914 (Tuesday) ==
- Zaian War – The French and Zayanes fought their first real battle in Morocco, with the French sustaining 17 dead and 77 wounded, while the tribal militias suffered 140 dead.
- German Undersecretary of State Arthur Zimmermann addressed requests by Austria-Hungary and Germany for investigation into the Archduke's assassination but were rebuffed by Serbia.
- The U.S. Government sold two decommissioned battleships — the USS Mississippi and the USS Idaho — to the Greek Navy at a sum of US$12 million. The ships were renamed Kilkis and Lemnos respectively.
- An Ilya Muromets airplane designed by Igor Sikorsky took off from Saint Petersburg for Kiev for its first long-range test flight.
- The village of Veteran, Alberta was established.
- Born:
  - Francisco da Costa Gomes, Portuguese politician, 15th President of Portugal; in Chaves, Portugal (d. 2001)
  - Allan Houser, American artist, known for his Modernist and Native American artworks including Comrades in Mourning, Legends Begin and Offering of the Sacred Pipe; near Apache, Oklahoma, United States (d. 1994)
