= List of shipwrecks in June 1914 =

The list of shipwrecks in June 1914 includes ships sunk, foundered, grounded, or otherwise lost during June 1914.

== 4 June ==
List of shipwrecks: 4 June 1914
| Ship | State | Description |
|---|---|---|
| Fulani | United Kingdom | The cargo ship ran aground on the Carpenter Rock, Sierra Leone. She was declared a total loss. |
| North Land | United States | The steamer went ashore on Bartletts Reef, near New London, Connecticut. |

== 6 June ==
List of shipwrecks: 6 June 1914
| Ship | State | Description |
|---|---|---|
| Oriole | United Kingdom | The cargo ship collided with Corinthian (United Kingdom) in the River Thames at East Greenwich, London and sank. All 24 people on board were rescued. She was refloated on 13 June and beached. |
| Pinto | United Kingdom | The cargo ship ran aground off Itajahy, Brazil and was wrecked. |

== 8 June ==
List of shipwrecks: 8 June 1914
| Ship | State | Description |
|---|---|---|
| Argenfels | Germany | The cargo ship struck a submerged object and was beached at Cape St. James, China. |
| Victoria Luise | Germany | The ocean liner ran aground in the Elbe and developed a list. Her engine rooms were flooded. She was later refloated, repaired and returned to service. |

== 9 June ==
List of shipwrecks: 9 June 1914
| Ship | State | Description |
|---|---|---|
| Castor | Norway | The schooner was driven ashore on the Schoughall Rocks, Berwickshire, United Kingdom. Her four crew were rescued. |

== 11 June ==
List of shipwrecks: 11 June 1914
| Ship | State | Description |
|---|---|---|
| Scotia | United Kingdom | The barquentine collided with Ogono (Spain) in the North Sea 3 nautical miles (5.6 km) off Souter Point, County Durham and sank. |
| Thyra | Norway | The cargo ship ran aground at Duncansby Head, Caithness, United Kingdom in dense fog. She later broke up. |

== 14 June ==
List of shipwrecks: 14 June 1914
| Ship | State | Description |
|---|---|---|
| Campbell | Norway | The whaler was driven ashore at Port Philip Heads, Victoria, Australia and was wrecked. Her crew were rescued. |

== 15 June ==
List of shipwrecks: 15 June 1914
| Ship | State | Description |
|---|---|---|
| Nachodka | Russia | The coaster sank in America Bay. |
| Unknown scow | United States | The scow broke loose from her tow in heavy seas at the entrance to the harbor of Cleveland, Ohio. She was driven onto the breakwater and broke up. Her only crewman was rescued by the United States Life Saving Service. |

== 16 June ==
List of shipwrecks: 16 June 1914
| Ship | State | Description |
|---|---|---|
| Tampico | (Mexico) Mexican Revolutionaries | Mexican Revolutionary Navy gunboat grounded, bombarded and scuttled under attack by Mexican Navy gunboat Guerrero at Topolobampo during Mexican Revolution. |

== 17 June ==
List of shipwrecks: 17 June 1914
| Ship | State | Description |
|---|---|---|
| HMHS Maine | United Kingdom | The hospital ship ran aground on the Isle of Mull, Argyll and was wrecked. |

== 18 June ==
List of shipwrecks: 18 June 1914
| Ship | State | Description |
|---|---|---|
| Dashwood | United Kingdom | The schooner was destroyed by fire at Kingston Dock, Glasgow, Renfrewshire. |
| Monrovia | United Kingdom | The cargo ship was wrecked 12 nautical miles (22 km) north of the mouth of the Futa River, Chile. |
| Navigator | United Kingdom | The schooner was destroyed by fire at Kingston Dock, Glasgow. |
| St. Nicholas | United Kingdom | The passenger ship ran aground and sank in Wick Bay, Orkney Islands. All on board were rescued. |
| Volant | United Kingdom | The schooner was destroyed by fire at Kingston Dock, Glasgow. |
| Warsash | United Kingdom | The sailing vessel was destroyed by fire at Kingston Dock, Glasgow. |

== 21 June ==
List of shipwrecks: 21 June 1914
| Ship | State | Description |
|---|---|---|
| City of Brockton | United States | The steamer ran aground in the harbor at Bridgeport, Connecticut. |

== 23 June ==
List of shipwrecks: 23 June 1914
| Ship | State | Description |
|---|---|---|
| USAJMP Capt. Charles W. Rowell | United States Army | The Mine planter went ashore on Great Gull Island, New York. Refloated and returned to service. |

== 24 June ==
List of shipwrecks: 24 June 1914
| Ship | State | Description |
|---|---|---|
| Esperanza | United States | The Yacht went ashore on Horseshoe Reef near Groton Long Point, Connecticut. |
| Gothland | United Kingdom | The cargo ship ran aground on the Bishop Rock, Isles of Scilly. She was refloated on 27 June and beached at St. Mary's. |
| Penhale | United Kingdom | The cargo ship struck rocks at Vaasa, Finland and was beached. She was refloated on 28 June. |

== 25 June ==
List of shipwrecks: 25 June 1914
| Ship | State | Description |
|---|---|---|
| Antares | Italy | The barque was reported in the Atlantic Ocean at approximately 7°N 25°W. She subsequently foundered with the loss of all hands. Wreckage washed up at Warramboo, South Australia in mid December. |

== 27 June ==
List of shipwrecks: 27 June 1914
| Ship | State | Description |
|---|---|---|
| California | United Kingdom | The ocean liner ran aground on Tory Island, County Donegal. Her passengers were taken off by four vessels which included Cassandra (United Kingdom) and HMS Swift (Royal Navy). California was refloated on 20 August, repaired and returned to service. |
| Dorothy | United Kingdom | The cargo ship ran aground at Punta Avaca, Chile. She was refloated on 2 July. |
| Gay Head | United States | The 252-ton whaling bark was wrecked on a reef off Castle Head (56°10′N 158°20′W) in Chignik Bay (56.2956°N 158.4015°W) on the south coast of the Alaska Peninsula in the Territory of Alaska. Her crew of 31 survived. |

== 29 June ==
List of shipwrecks: 29 June 1914
| Ship | State | Description |
|---|---|---|
| Lord Antrim | United Kingdom | The cargo ship ran aground at Cabo Raso, Portugal. Salvage efforts were abandoned on 10 July. |

== 30 June ==
List of shipwrecks: 30 June 1914
| Ship | State | Description |
|---|---|---|
| Pardo | United Kingdom | The cargo ship collided with Hyanthes (United Kingdom) in the River Plate and was beached. |

== Unknown date ==
List of shipwrecks: Unknown date 1914
| Ship | State | Description |
|---|---|---|
| Datetree | United Kingdom | The cargo ship ran aground on the Brissons, Cape Cornwall. She broke in two on 6 July and was declared a total loss. |
| Emma J. Chesebro | United States | The schooner sank in the Connecticut River on 4 or 10 June, after striking a railroad bridge pier at the mouth of the river. The wreck was removed to flats as a hazard to navigation by 12 June. |
| Ingebjörg | Norway | The barque was dismasted in the Atlantic Ocean (approximately 34°S 50°W). She was abandoned and set afire. Her crew were rescued by Hawkhead (United Kingdom). |
| Kintuck | United Kingdom | The cargo ship ran aground off Batavia, Netherlands East Indies at the end of June due to high seas caused by an earthquake. She was refloated on 2 July. |
