= Vasileios Sotiriadis =

Greek politician

Vasileios Sotiriadis (Greek: Βασίλειος Σωτηριάδης) was a Greek politician and representative of Northern Epirus during the struggle for the establishment of the Autonomous Republic of Northern Epirus in 1914.

Sotiriadis was from Leskovik, in modern southern Albania. He was one of the two representatives of Leskovik in the Assembly of Delvino in July 1914, where the representatives of Northern Epirus were to ratify the Protocol of Corfu, that granted autonomy to the region.

Sotiriadis was later elected as member of the Greek parliament (1915-1917) for the Argyrokastro prefecture, when his homeland came under Greek control.

== Sources ==
- Iakovidis, Savvas Charalambous (2011). "The Separatist Movement in Northern Epirus (1914)". University of Thessaloniki: Digital Library. Aristotle University of Thessaloniki: 64, 70.
- Kaphetzopoulos, Ioannis; Flokas, Charalambos; Dima-Dimitriou, Angeliki (2000). The Struggle for Northern Epirus. Athens: Hellenic Army General Staff, Army History Directorate. ISBN 9789607897404.
