= Iosif Adamidis =

Greek politician

Iosif Adamidis (Greek: Ιωσήφ Αδαμίδης) was a Greek politician.

Adamidis was born in Korçë. In following July he participated in the Delvino Assembly, as a representative of Korçë, where the delegates of the Autonomous Republic of Northern Epirus ratified the Protocol of Corfu. The latter document granted an autonomous status for Northern Epirus under nominal Albanian sovereignty.

He was elected as member of the Greek parliament (1915–1917) for the Korytsa prefecture, when his birth city came under Greek control.

== Sources ==
- Kaphetzopoulos, Ioannis; Flokas, Charalambos; Dima-Dimitriou, Angeliki (2000). The Struggle for Northern Epirus. Athens: Hellenic Army General Staff, Army History Directorate. ISBN 9789607897404.
