= 1914 Butte, Montana, labor riots =

Labor riots

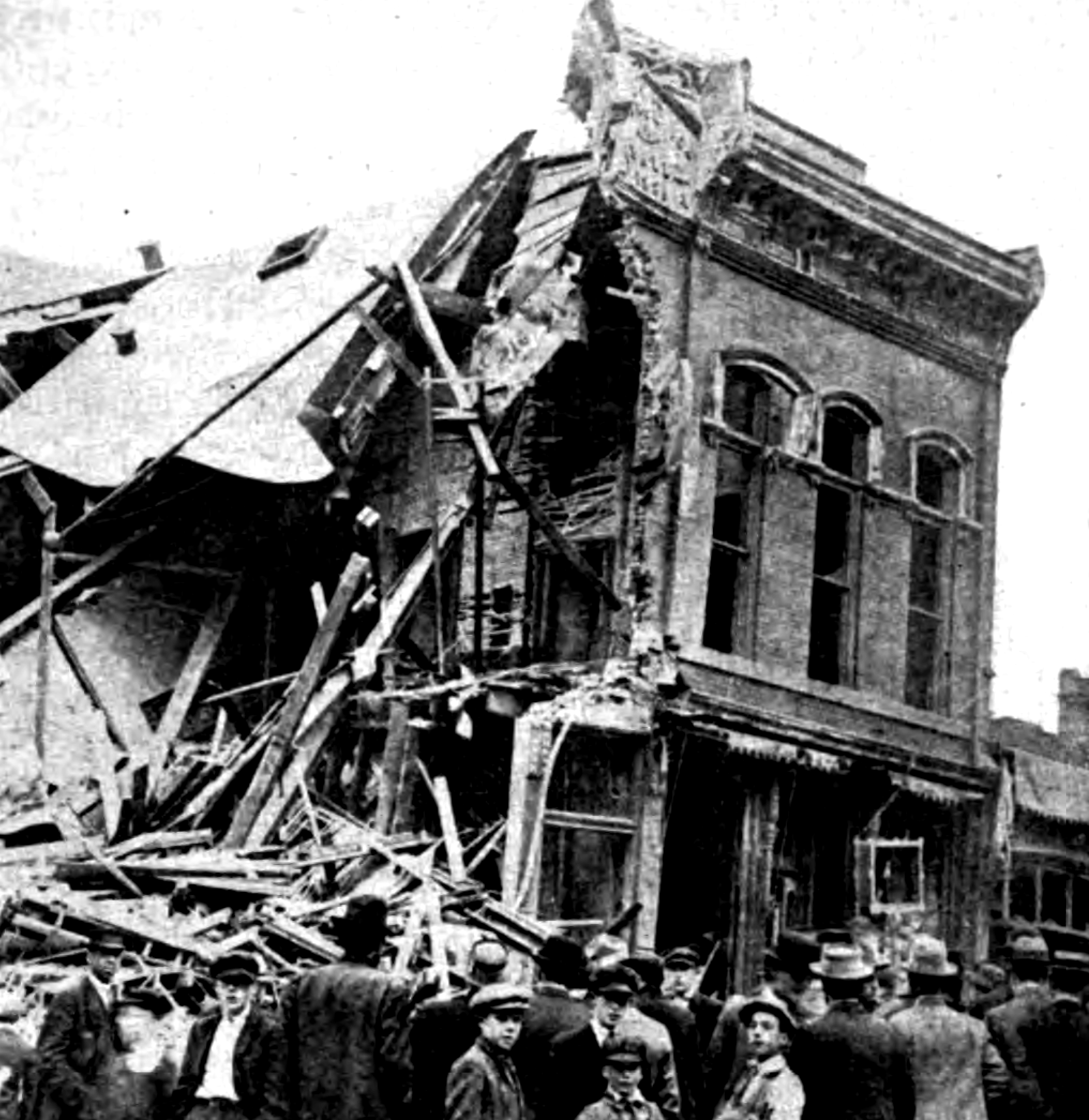
Union hall of the Western Federation of Miners local at Butte, Montana, after its destruction by dissident miners on 23 June 1914.

The Butte, Montana labor riots of 1914 were a series of violent clashes between copper miners at Butte, Montana. The opposing factions were the miners dissatisfied with the Western Federation of Miners local at Butte, on the one hand, and those loyal to the union local on the other. The dissident miners formed a new union, and demanded that all miners must join the new union, or be subject to beatings or forced expulsion from the area. Sources disagree whether the dissidents were a majority of the miners, or a militant minority. The leadership of the new union contained many who were members of the Industrial Workers of the World (I.W.W.), or agreed with the I.W.W.'s methods and objectives. The result of the dispute between rival unions was that the copper mines of Butte, which had long been a union stronghold for the WFM, became open shop employers, and recognized no union from 1914 until 1934.

== Background ==
The Butte Miners' Union No. 1 was founded in 1878. In 1885, the Butte union hosted the organizing conference for the Western Federation of Miners (WFM) , and became the WFM's first chapter.

The WFM took advantage of the "War of the Copper Kings," a struggle of mine owners to control the copper mines at Butte. On one side was Marcus Daly; on the other side were William A. Clark and F. Augustus Heinze. Daly later sold out to the Amalgamated Copper Company, which was backed by Standard Oil directors William Rockefeller and Henry H. Rogers, but the feud continued. The union played one side off the other to win 8-hour work days and higher wages. But when Heinze sold his Butte holdings to Amalgamated Copper in 1906, the district became dominated by a single company, Amalgamated Copper, and the union lost its former advantage.

In 1907, the Butte Miners' Union had decided to increase wages to $4.00 per day, and $4.50 per day for shaft sinking. Previously, the union had been able to inform the management of its demands, and, for the most part, the union got what it wanted. But this time, the company pushed back. Instead of a raise, the company offered a sliding scale based on the price of copper. The agreement was not popular with the membership, so the local leadership simply did not put it to a vote.

== The Western Federation of Miners and the IWW ==
Leaders of the Western Federation of Miners such as Bill Haywood and Vincent St. John were instrumental in forming the I.W.W. in 1905, and the WFM quickly affiliated with the new union organization. The WFM became the I.W.W.'s "mining section". When three WFM officers, Haywood, Pettibone and Moyer were accused of conspiracy in the murder of former Idaho governor Frank Steunenberg, the IWW took it up as a cause celebre, held public rallies, and funded the legal defense.

However, many of the WFM rank and file were uncomfortable with the open radicalism of the I.W.W., and wanted the WFM to maintain its independence. In the summer of 1907, the WFM withdrew from the I.W.W. Bill Haywood and Vincent St. John left the WFM to spend their time organizing the I.W.W.

But the I.W.W. wanted its mining section back. In 1908, Vincent St. John tried to organize a stealth takeover of the WFM. He wrote to WFM organizer Albert Ryan, encouraging him to find reliable I.W.W. sympathizers at each WFM local, and have them appointed delegates to the annual convention by pretending to share whatever opinions of that local needed to become a delegate. Once at the convention, they could vote in a pro-I.W.W. slate. St. Vincent promised: "... once we can control the officers of the WFM for the I.W.W., the big bulk of the membership will go with them." But the takeover did not succeed.

Contrary to rejoining the I.W.W., in 1911, the Western Federation of Miners affiliated itself with the more conservative American Federation of Labor (AFL).

== Grievances against the Butte Miners' Union No. 1 ==
In June 1914, a large number of Butte miners were dissatisfied with the Butte Miners' Union #1, a WFM local. The dissatisfied miners accused the leadership of the WFM local of stuffing ballot boxes in union elections, and of being in the pay of the Amalgamated Copper Company, which controlled all the important Butte mines. The Butte miners complained of special assessments imposed on them for strike funds in other districts.

Finnish miners charged that the Irish-dominated union had allowed the Anaconda Copper Company to fire several hundred Finnish miners. The union objected, but failed to get the Finns reinstated, and the union was unwilling to call a strike over the matter. The Anaconda company had apparently fired the Finns for being socialists.

The union had imposed a card system in the district, by which every miner had to show his paid-up union card when he showed up for his shift. Although the miners were staunchly pro-union, it was common for miners to fall behind in their dues, and the card system was unpopular. On June 12, 1914, two shifts of miners at the Speculator mine refused to show their cards, and staged an impromptu march to downtown Butte. The next day was a holiday: the anniversary of the founding of the Butte Miners' Union No. 1.

== Riot at the Miners' Union day parades ==
The first disturbance occurred on June 13, 1914, during the Miners' Union day celebration, commemorating the founding of the Butte Miners' Union in 1878. Dissident union members assaulted union officers marching in the Miners' Union day parade. Local president Bert Riley fled.

The crowd of dissidents left the parade and attacked the WFM local's headquarters, hauling away a safe, which they later blew open; they said that they were looking for evidence of corruption of union officials. When alderman and acting mayor Frank Curran went to the union hall and tried to calm the crowd, he was thrown out a second-story window. The crowd took $1,600 from inside the safe, and destroyed all the records of the WFM local. They also dynamited the home of P.K. Sullivan, a local union official. Two men who were arrested were sprung from jail, and carried away on the shoulders of the crowd. The dissidents visited the three Butte newspaper offices, and demanded that the papers not use the words "mob" or "rioters" in describing the events. They also warned the papers not to print anything critical of the IWW.

The city police and county sheriff watched the riot without attempting to stop it; one witness reported a policeman laughing while rioting went on in front of him. Socialist mayor Lewis Duncan defended his decision to keep the police from interfering, because, he said, the WFM local leadership was corrupt, and police action would have increased the violence.

The disturbances quieted down within a couple of days. Montana Governor Stewart asked the local officials about the situation, but the city mayor and the county sheriff assured him that local authorities could handle the situation.

On June 21, a mass meeting of miners numbering from 3,000 to 5,000 - estimates vary - met and organized a new union, the Butte Mine Workers' Union, with a 20-man executive council, most of whom were members of the I.W.W. The new union warned all miners in Butte they had to quit the WFM and join the new union. This was followed by beatings and deportations of those who refused to quit the WFM and join the new union. The president of the new union, Muckie McDonald, threatened to use what he called "Direct Action" against anyone who opposed the Butte Mine Workers' Union. The new union quickly signed up several thousand members. Street-corner agitators urged the looting of stores and the destruction of public buildings with dynamite.

Because the city police refused to interfere, businessmen hired private guards. The Chamber of Commerce called for a mass meeting to discuss ways of dealing with the violence, and for appealing to the city council to remove Mayor Duncan. But after receiving threats that anyone attending the meeting would be marked for violence, the Chamber called off the meeting.

== Dynamiting the union hall ==
On June 23, ten days after the Miner's Union day riots, WFM national president Charles Moyer arrived in Butte to resolve the differences between the WFM and its dissident members. But while Moyer spoke to about 200 WFM members in the union hall, the building was surrounded by a large crowd, who pelted the building with eggs. A union miner walking up the steps to attend the meeting was shot dead by someone inside the building. A gunfight ensued between those inside the building and those outside. An innocent bystander was shot and killed.

While the crowd prevented the WFM members from leaving, some of the insurgents stole dynamite from a nearby copper mine, and placed a charge of 27 sticks next to the building, and set it off. They then systematically set other dynamite explosions, until the WFM union hall building was destroyed, but the people inside had managed to escape out the back down a fire escape, when those guarding the back had run around to the front. WFM president Moyer hid from the mob all day and night, until he finally snuck out of town in an automobile at 5 am the next morning, and headed to Helena, Montana.

In Helena, WFM President Charles Moyer asked the governor to provide him protection. Some later charged that Moyer had requested that troops be sent in, but he insisted that he had not asked for troops, only personal protection. The governor again contacted the sheriff and the mayor, who had done nothing to halt the violence, but they assured the governor that the situation did not require National Guard troops. In addition, 200 miners signed a petition telling the governor that there was no need to send troops.

In late August, the new miners' union went on strike. The strikers marched in mass to various Butte copper mines, threatening the miners if they did not quit the WFM and join the new union. On August 30, a dynamite explosion blew up an office of the Anaconda Mining Company. The next day, the governor declared martial law in Butte.

== The National Guard restores order ==
Contrary to the express wishes of the mayor of Butte and the county sheriff, Governor Stewart declared martial law and sent in about 500 National Guardsmen, who arrived on 1 September 1914. The Guard halted publication of The Butte Socialist newspaper. The troops arrested the president, vice president, and a board member of the insurgent union, and held them without bail. When arrested, the vice president of the Butte Miners' Union carried a letter from Vincent St. John, a former WFM official who by then had quit the WFM and was General Secretary-Treasurer of the I.W.W. The letter suggested to some that the new union had formed with the intention of creating a mining affiliate of the I.W.W.

On 9 September, the mine owners announced that they would recognize neither union, because neither union appeared to be able to keep the peace among the miners. The owners said that they would nonetheless honor the terms of the existing contract with the WFM. But the mines, previously WFM union shops, would be run as open shops, with no distinction as to union membership.

On 6 October, the district court ordered that Butte Mayor Lewis Duncan and the county sheriff be removed from office for not performing their duties. The county commissioners appointed a new sheriff, and the city council chose a new mayor.

The three officers of the insurgent union were put on trial charged with kidnapping, for forcibly driving miners who refused to join the new union to leave the district. The defendants objected that what they had done was just standard practice of the WFM. President Muckie McDonald and Vice-President Joseph Bradley were found guilty and sentenced to three years and seven years, respectively. The third union officer was acquitted.

The last National Guardsmen left Butte on 12 November 1914.

== Legacy ==
In December, the national board of the Western Federation of Miners belatedly charged the local officers in Butte with various failures to perform their duties, and asked for their resignation; they refused. WFM attorney Guy Miller went to court to gain control of the local on behalf of the national Western Federation of Miners, but failed in the courts. The courts held that the local was owned and controlled by its members, not the national union.

The result of the riots, and the ensuing standoff between the two labor factions, was that the former union stronghold of Butte became an open-shop district, and the mine owners recognized no union from 1914 until 1934. Although the IWW was not officially connected with the new miners union or the riots, The WFM leadership, along with other labor unions, blamed the disturbances on the IWW.
