= Assembly of Delvino =

Meeting of the representatives of the Autonomous Republic of Northern Epirus

Panepirotic Assembly of Delvino Πανηπειρωτική Διάσκεψη του Δέλβινου
- Ratification of the Protocol of Corfu; Approval of autonomy of Northern Epirus inside the borders of the Principality of Albania
- Flag of the Autonomous Republic of Northern Epirus

History
- Established: June 23, 1914
- Disbanded: July 26, 1914
- Preceded by: Northern Epirote Declaration of Independence

Elections
- Voting system: unanimity (representatives of Himara abstained)

Meeting place
- Delvinë (southern Albania)

The Pan-Epirotic Assembly of Delvino (Greek: Πανηπειρωτική Διάσκεψη Δέλβινου) was a meeting of the representatives of the Autonomous Republic of Northern Epirus, in June–July 1914, that ratified the Protocol of Corfu. The latter agreement granted an autonomous status for Northern Epirus, as well as a number of rights for the local Greek populations, inside the borders of the newly established Principality of Albania.

The assembly took place in the town of Delvinë (southern Albania) with the participation of deputies from all provinces of Northern Epirus. It lasted from June 23 to July 26, 1914, and led to the ratification of the terms of the Protocol of Corfu, despite objections raised by various sides asking for wider autonomy. The Greek government under Prime Minister Eleftherios Venizelos, also supported the approval of the Protocol, as the only means to secure peace and stability for the region, while on the other hand the representatives of the coastal region of Himara, insisted that only incorporation to Greece would be a viable solution for Northern Epirus.

== Background ==
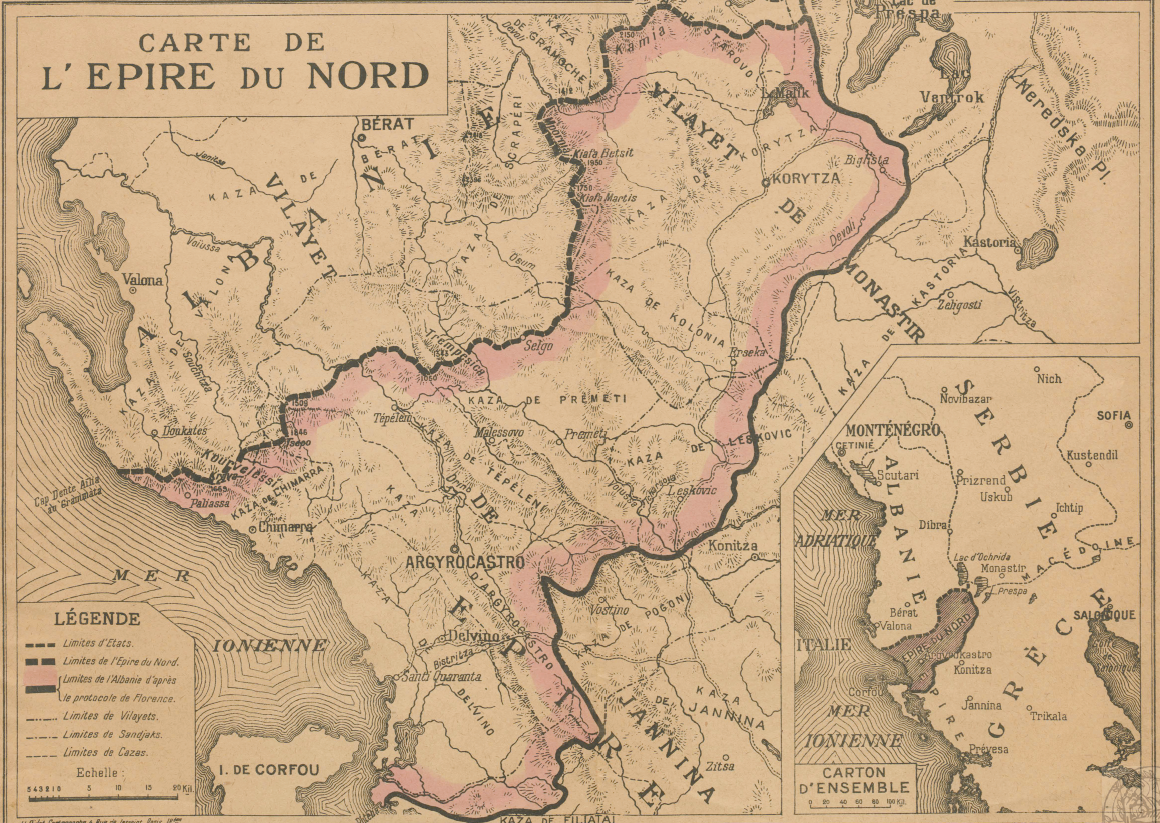
Map of Northern Epirus presented to the Paris Peace Conference of 1919, by the exiled provisional government of Northern Epirus

By the end of the Balkan Wars (1912-1913), Greek armed forces managed to defeat the Ottoman army and control most of the historical region of Epirus. Thus, they reached a line from Himara on the Ionian coast east to Prespa Lake. Pending the final decision of the following peace treaty, the region remained under Greek military control. On 17 December 1913, the Protocol of Florence ceded the northern part of Epirus to the newly established Principality of Albania. This turn of events catalysed an uprising among the local Greek population, who declared the independence of Northern Epirus. The Autonomous Republic of Northern Epirus was thus proclaimed in Argyrokastro (Gjirokastër) on 28 February 1914, while a provisional government was formed under Georgios Christakis-Zografos.

Meanwhile, serious disturbances broke out in a number of places between the Northern Epirote forces and Albanian gendarmerie units and irregulars. An International Commission of Control formed by the Great Powers to secure stability and peace in the region was unable to achieve an agreement between the two sides.

=== Protocol of Corfu ===
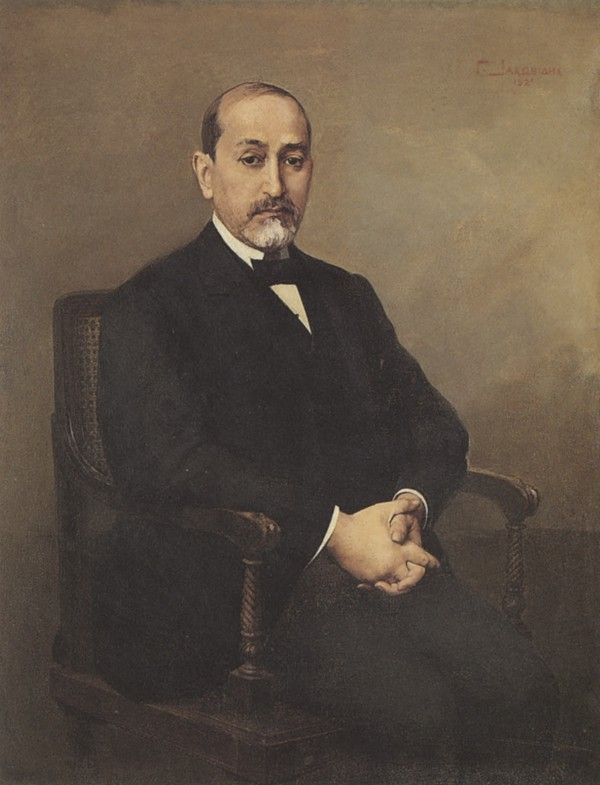
Georgios Christakis-Zografos, president of the Autonomous Republic of Northern Epirus.

By May 17, 1914, at a meeting held nearby in Corfu, Greece, representatives from both sides signed an agreement that would be known as Protocol of Corfu. According to this the districts of Korytsa and Argyrokastro, which form Northern Epirus, were recognized as an autonomous self-governing region under the sovereignty of the newly established Prince William of Albania. Moreover, the agreement granted the local Greeks wider religious, educational, cultural and political autonomy, inside the borders of the Albanian state. Subsequently, on June 1 the Great Powers approved the terms of the Protocol, while on June 23 they were officially approved by the Albanian Government.

== First meeting ==
The Northern Epirote representatives in the following Pan-Epirotic Assembly of Delvino had to take the final decision on whether to accept the Protocol. The provisional government had to assemble the representatives from all parts of Northern Epirus in order to ratify the terms of the Protocol. Thus, Delvino, which was one of the first towns in Northern Epirus to declare autonomy against annexation to Albania, was proclaimed the seat of the following assembly. The representatives, listed by province, were as follows:

- Himara: Spyros Spyromilios, Dimitrios Lekkas, Nikolaos Milios
- Agioi Saranta: Ioannis Kouremenos
- Delvino: Evangelos Giatis, Evangelos Trichas, Panagiotis Lezos
- Argyrokastro: Kyriakos Kyritsis, Georgios Tselios, Charalambos Katsis
- Premeti: Zacharias Alexiou, Charalambos Donatos, Georgios Syngelos
- Tepeleni: Petros Charitos, Vasileios Dilios
- Pogoni: Georgios Ginopoulos, Papaspyros, Dimitriadis
- Leskoviki: Vasileios Sotiriadis, Ilias Oikonomou Rousis
- Erseka: Petros Prontinis, Dimitrios Papanastasiou
- Korytsa (Korcë): Iosif Adamidis, Konstantinos Skenderis, metropolitan bishop of Korytsa, Germanos, Konstantinos Polenas
- Additional five delegates, representing the wider region.

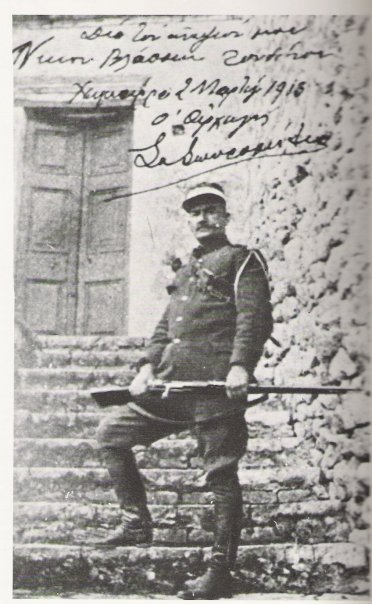
Representatives of Himara region, among them Spyros Spyromilios, insisted that only union with Greece would be a viable solution for Northern Epirus

The provisional government was represented by its president, Georgios-Christakis Zografos, as well as by Dimitrios Doulis, Alexandros Karapanos, Georgios Boussios, and the local metropolitan bishops Vasileios and Spyridon. Discussions started at June 23. Zografos, stated in his inaugural speech:

I should add that the danger for the fortunes of our nation has not dissipated entirely. There is therefore a great need for circumspection and vigilance to the decisions which are to be taken by this assembly on whether to ratify or not the Corfu agreement

Additionally, Zografos proposed that the working sessions be put off until June 26, so the representatives would have the sufficient time to study the text of the Protocol.

== Political and military developments ==
Meanwhile, political turmoil broke out in Albania, where the official government was unable to control the situation. The guerrilla forces of Essad Pasha Toptani managed to capture Elbasan in central Albania, while various irregular bands in this sector pillaged the countryside and moved against Korcë, which was part of the Northern Epirus region, but still under the control of the Albanian gendarmerie.

Zografos, worried by these developments, and contrary to the warnings of the Greek Prime Minister, Eleftherios Venizelos, ordered the Northern Epirote forces to enter the city immediately, which happened in July. Finally, Essad Pasha requested negotiations with the Northern Epirotes since he was already involved with the conflict against Prince Wied. At the same time, in the sector of Këlcyrë (Kleisoura) the autonomist forces successfully engaged Albanian units.

=== Disagreements over the Protocol and ratification ===
The military successes of the Northern Epirote forces triggered much enthusiasm among some of their leaders. The latter claimed that the northern border of Northern Epirus should be drawn further north, including additional areas which, according to them, where once also part of historical Epirus. Additionally, some Epitore representatives claimed that they should negotiate for wider autonomy, while the Greek populations of Vlorë and Berat, which lay north of the claimed autonomist boundary, should also enjoy the same religious and educational rights.

The Greek government, without being involved until then in the situation, was aware of the negotiations and the possibility of a final agreement. Greek Prime Minister Venizelos urged Zografos to approve the protocol’s terms as soon as possible without asking for even wider autonomy. Venizelos warned Zografos of the risks that would entail in case of non-ratification:

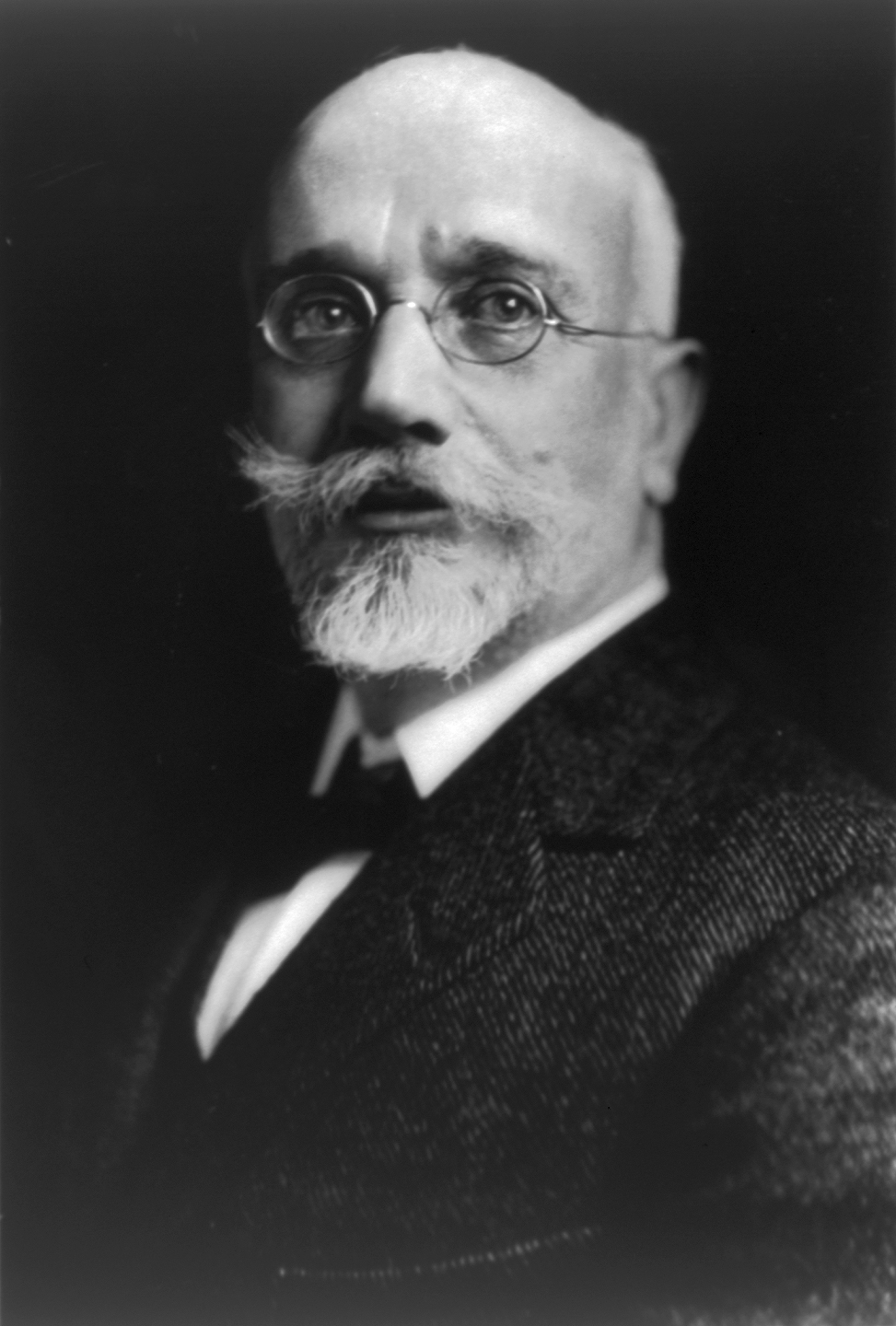
Greek Prime Minister, Eleftherios Venizelos, urged Zografos to accept the Protocol of Corfu.

I am surprised to see that you are hesitating over the ratification of the Corfu agreement by the Epirot assembly. We consider this an absolutely necessary act, so that a basis can exist safeguarding that which has already been gained. Otherwise the Greek government cannot content itself with the announcement of the Powers that they have ratified the Corfu agreement, nor can it ask, based on this announcement, anything if the Epirots do not accept this treaty...

The Assembly met in session again at June 26, and discussions were long and intense. The strongest objections were raised by the representatives of Himara, and especially by its representative, Spyros Spyromilios. The latter considered that the Northern Epirotes had nothing to gain from this Protocol, despite the hard won struggle. Especially, he claimed that the Protocol’s provisions about Himara, were left to the goodwill of the International Commission of Control. Spyromilios also reminded the delegates that when the Northern Epirote struggle started, in February 1914, all participants had unanimously decided for "complete autonomy or total destruction".

In general, all the representatives agreed that the Protocol did not fulfil the aspirations of the Northern Epirote struggle. Finally, the delegates ratified the terms of Protocol of Corfu. On the other hand, the representatives of Himara decided to withdraw, protesting in favor of union (Enosis) with Greece.

== Aftermath ==
The Protocol of Corfu, although having been accepted by both sides and sanctioned by the Great Powers, was unable to be implemented. After the outbreak of World War I on July 28, 1914, the situation in Albania became unstable and political chaos ensued. When the country became split into a number of regional governments, Prince William departed the country in September 1914. On 27 October, after approval of the Great Powers, the Greek army re-entered Northern Epirus and the Provisional Government of Northern Epirus formally ceased to exist, declaring that it had accomplished its objectives. The region was de facto annexed to Greece until the second half of 1916, when Italian troops evicted the Greek army from the area. After the end of World War I it was finally ceded to the Principality of Albania.

== Sources ==
- Boeckh, Katrin (1996). Von den Balkankriegen zum Ersten Weltkrieg: Kleinstaatenpolitik und ethnische Selbstbestimmung auf dem Balkan (in German). Oldenbourg Wissenschaftsverlag. p. 418. ISBN 978-3-486-56173-9.
- Kaphetzopoulos, Ioannis; Flokas, Charalambos; Dima-Dimitriou, Angeliki (2000). The struggle for Northern Epirus. Athens: Hellenic Army General Staff, Army History Directorate. ISBN 9789607897404.
- Kondis, Basil (1976). Greece and Albania: 1908-1914 (Thesis). Thessaloniki: Institute for Balkan Studies, New York University. doi:10.12681/eadd/4724. hdl:10442/hedi/4724.
- Miller, William (1966). Ottoman empire and its successors, 1801-1927. Routledge. ISBN 978-0-7146-1974-3.
- Sakellariou, M. V. (1997). Epirus, 4000 Years of Greek history and Civilization. Athens: Ekdotike Athenon. ISBN 9789602133712.
- Stickney, Edith Pierpont (1926). Southern Albania or northern Epirus in European international affairs, 1912-1923. Stanford University Press. ISBN 978-0-8047-6171-0.
- O’Brien, Tara Ashley. "Manufacturing Homogeneity in the Modern Albanian Nation-Building Project" (PDF). Central European University of Budapest.
