= Shingashi Station =

Railway station in Kawagoe, Saitama Prefecture, Japan

TJ20 Shingashi Station 新河岸駅
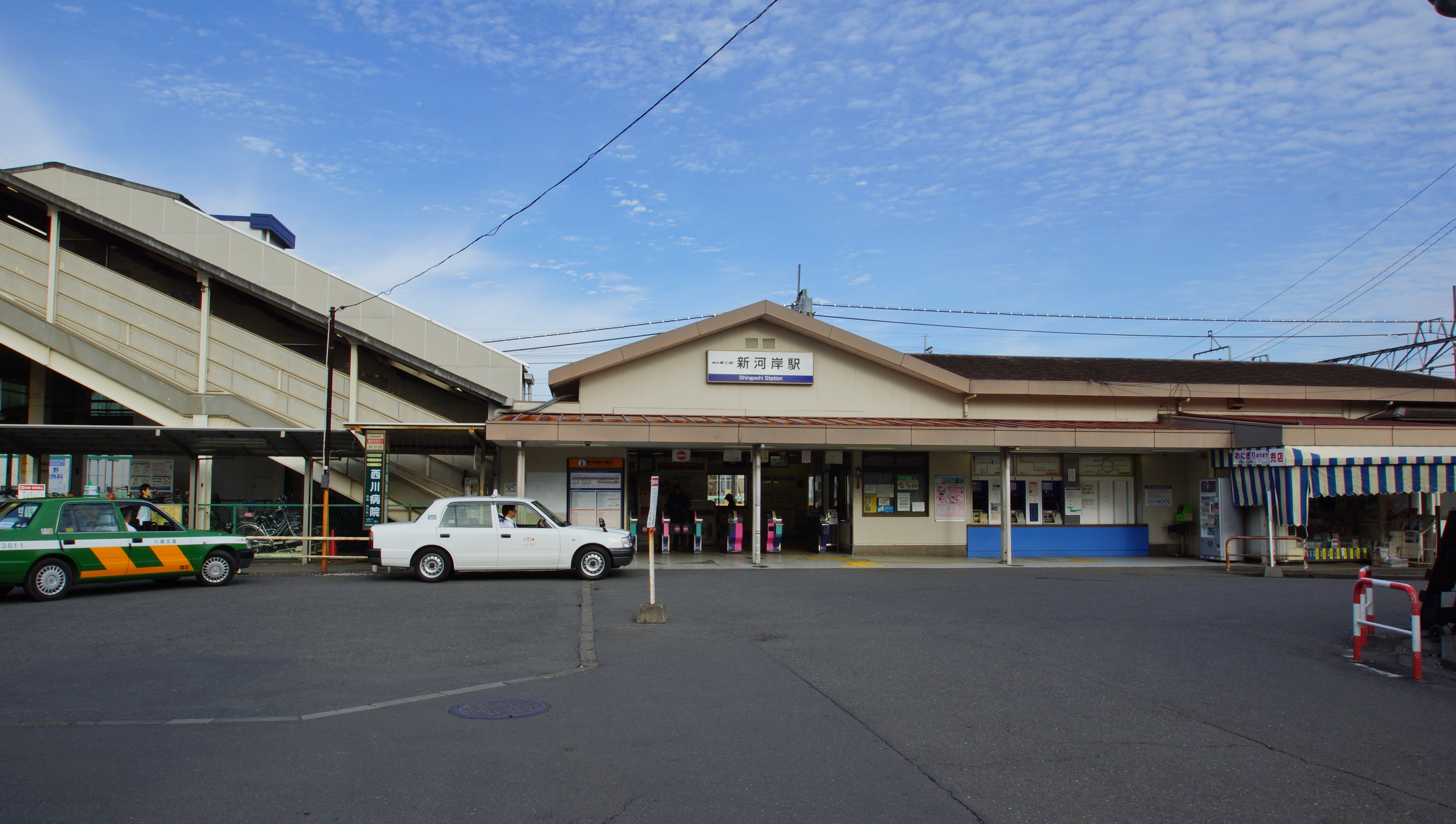
- The station entrance and forecourt in November 2015

General information
- Location: 914-5 Suna, Kawagoe-shi, Saitama-ken 350-1133; Japan
- Coordinates: 35.8907°N 139.4975°E
- Operator: Tōbu Railway
- Line: Tōbu Tōjō Line
- Distance: 28.3 km from Ikebukuro
- Platforms: 1 island platform
- Tracks: 2

Other information
- Station code: TJ-20
- Website: Official website

History
- Opened: 17 June 1914
- Rebuilt: 2016–2017
- Former names: Takashina (until 1916)

Passengers
- FY2019: 25,834 daily

Services
Preceding station	Tobu Railway	Following station
Kawagoe TJ21 towards Yorii	Tojo Line Semi Express Local	Kami-Fukuoka TJ19 towards Ikebukuro
Location
- Location within Saitama Prefecture Location within Japan

Shingashi Station (新河岸駅, Shingashi-eki) is a passenger railway station located in the city of Kawagoe, Saitama, Japan, operated by the private railway operator Tōbu Railway.

== Lines ==
Shingashi Station is served by the Tōbu Tōjō Line from Ikebukuro in Tokyo, with some services inter-running via the Tokyo Metro Yurakucho Line to Shin-Kiba and the Tokyo Metro Fukutoshin Line to Shibuya and onward via the Tokyu Toyoko Line and Minato Mirai Line to Motomachi-Chukagai. Located between Kami-Fukuoka and Kawagoe, it is 28.3 km from the Ikebukuro terminus. Only Semi express and Local services stop at this station.

== Station layout ==
The station consists of a single island platform serving two tracks, connected to the station building by a footbridge. Storage sidings are located on either side of the station for track maintenance equipment.

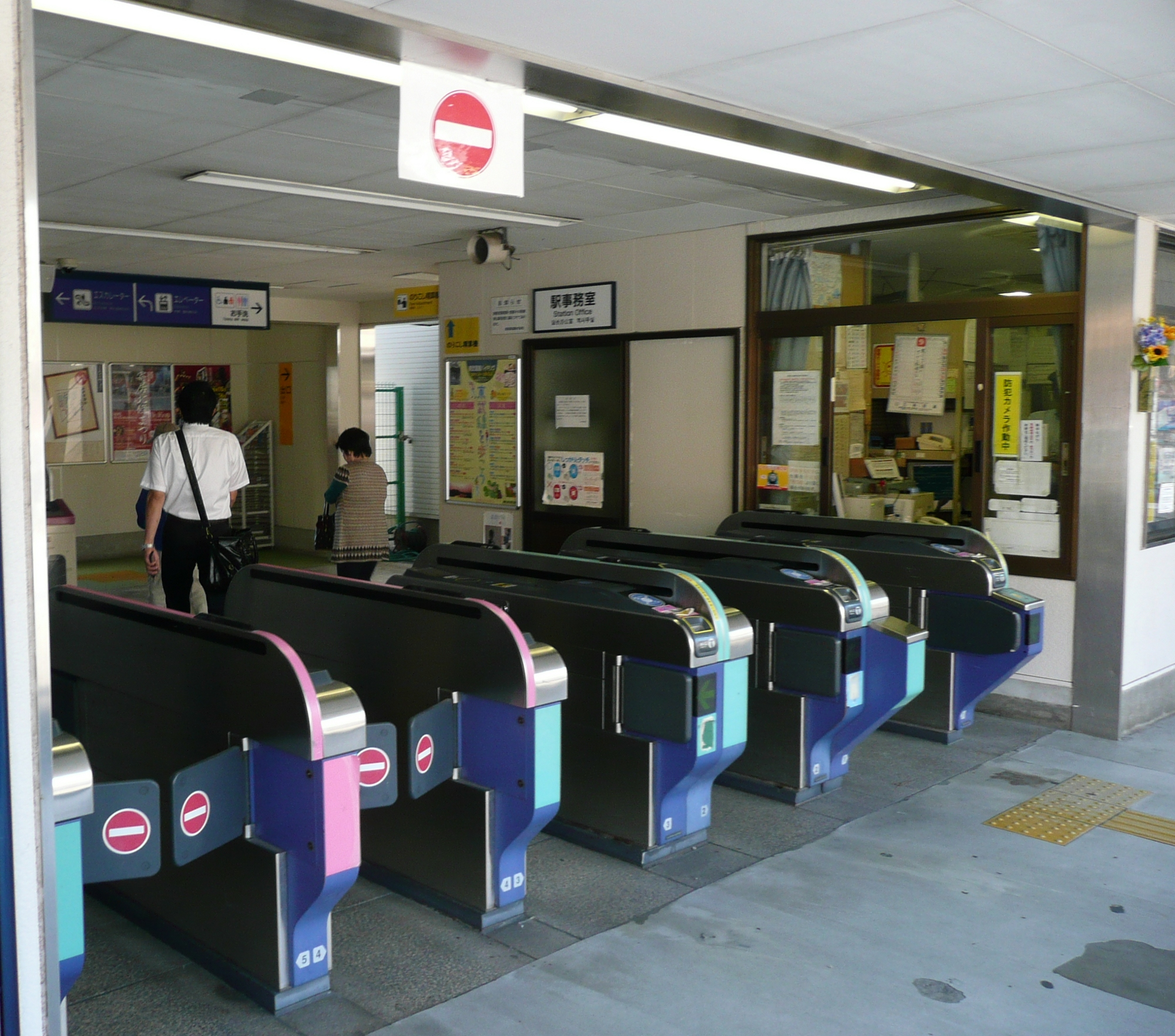
The ticket barriers in September 2011

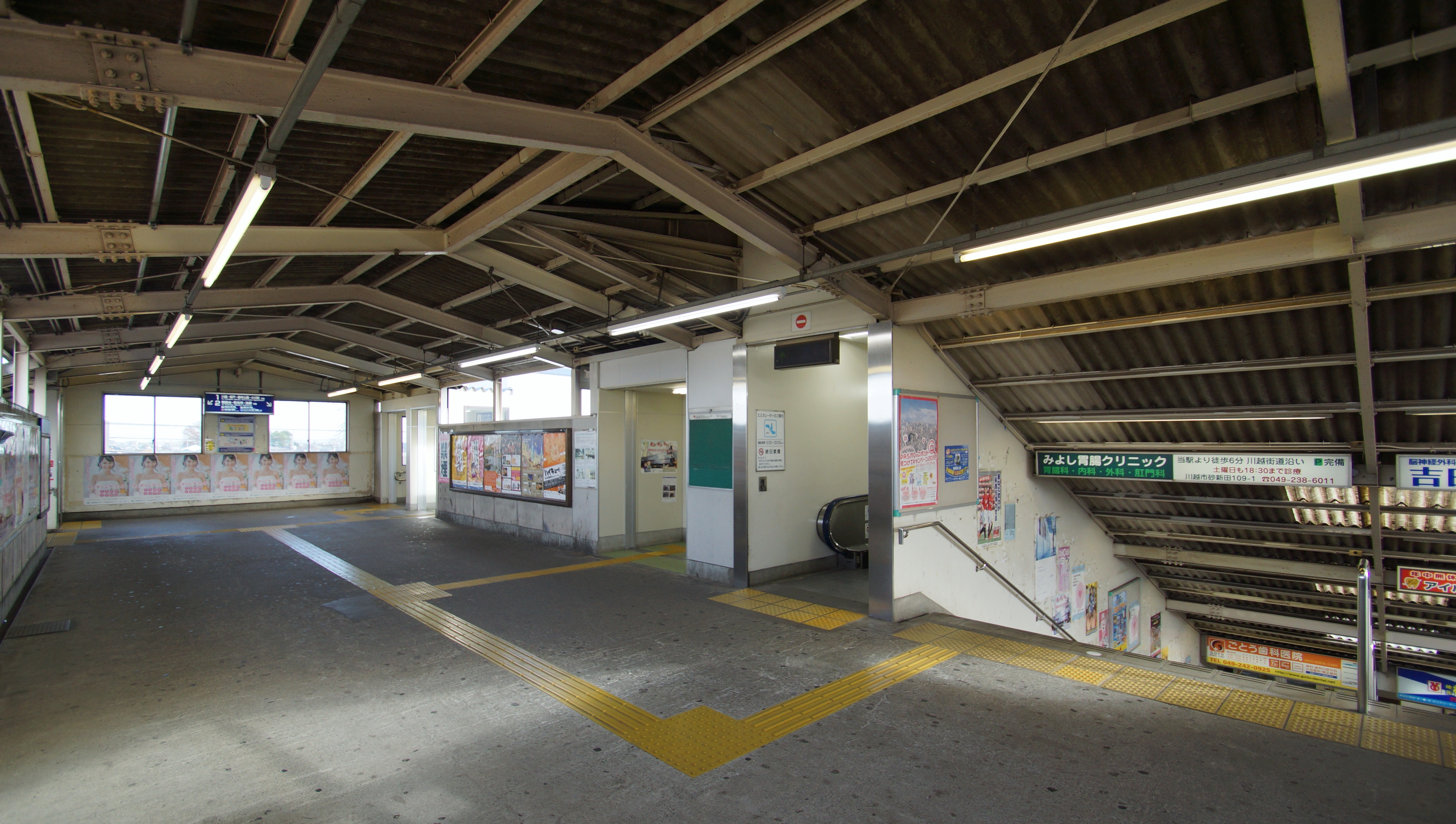
The footbridge to the platforms in November 2015

=== Platforms ===
1	■ Tōbu Tōjō Line	for Kawagoe, Shinrinkōen, Ogawamachi, and Yorii
2	■ Tōbu Tōjō Line	for Fujimino, Wakōshi, Narimasu, and Ikebukuro; Tokyo Metro Yurakucho Line for Shin-Kiba; Tokyo Metro Fukutoshin Line for Shibuya; Tōkyū Tōyoko Line for Hiyoshi and Yokohama; Tōkyū Shin-Yokohama Line for Shin-Yokohama via Sōtetsu Shin-Yokohama Line for Shōnandai; Minatomirai Line for Motomachi-Chukagai

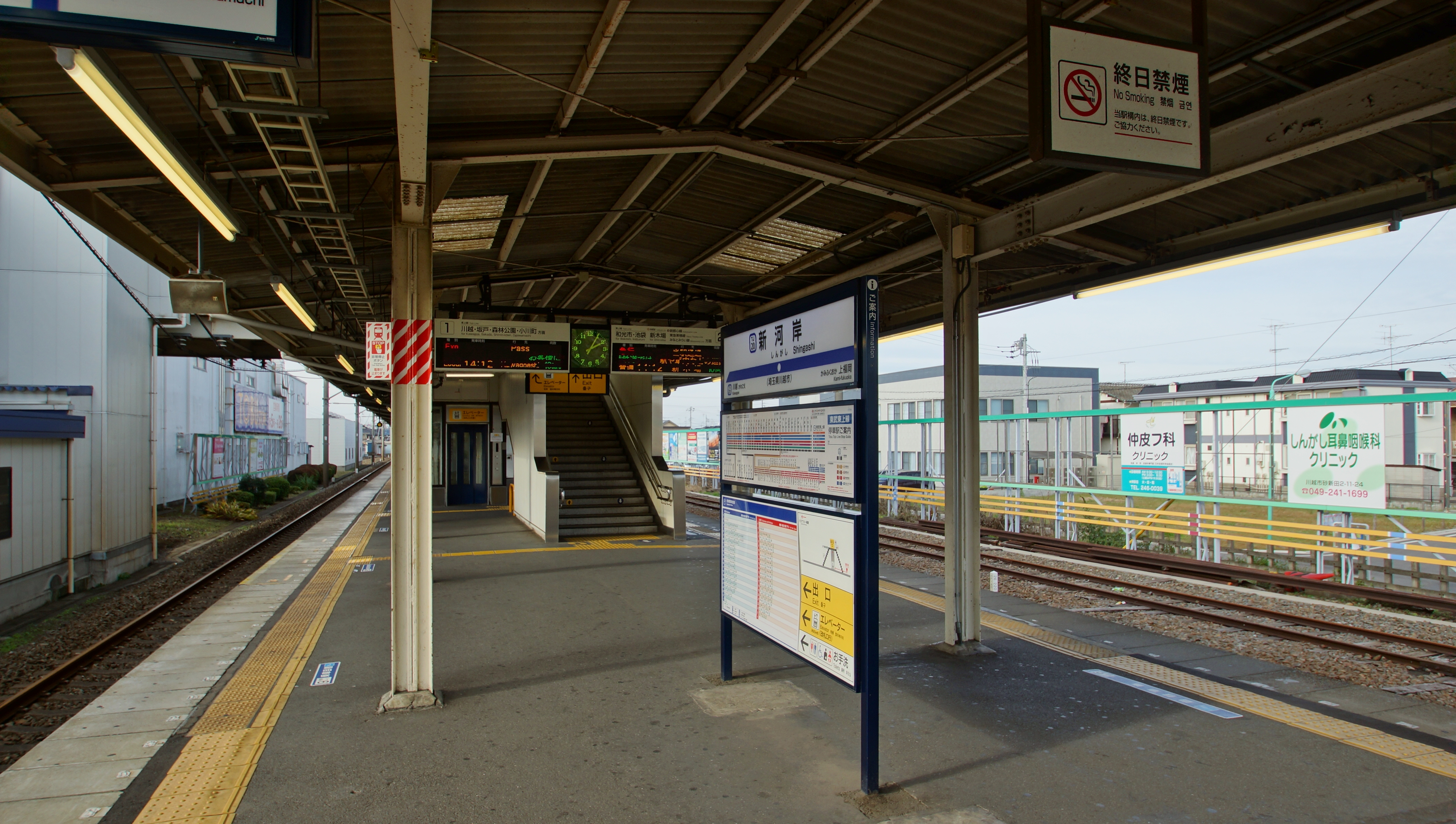
The platforms in November 2015

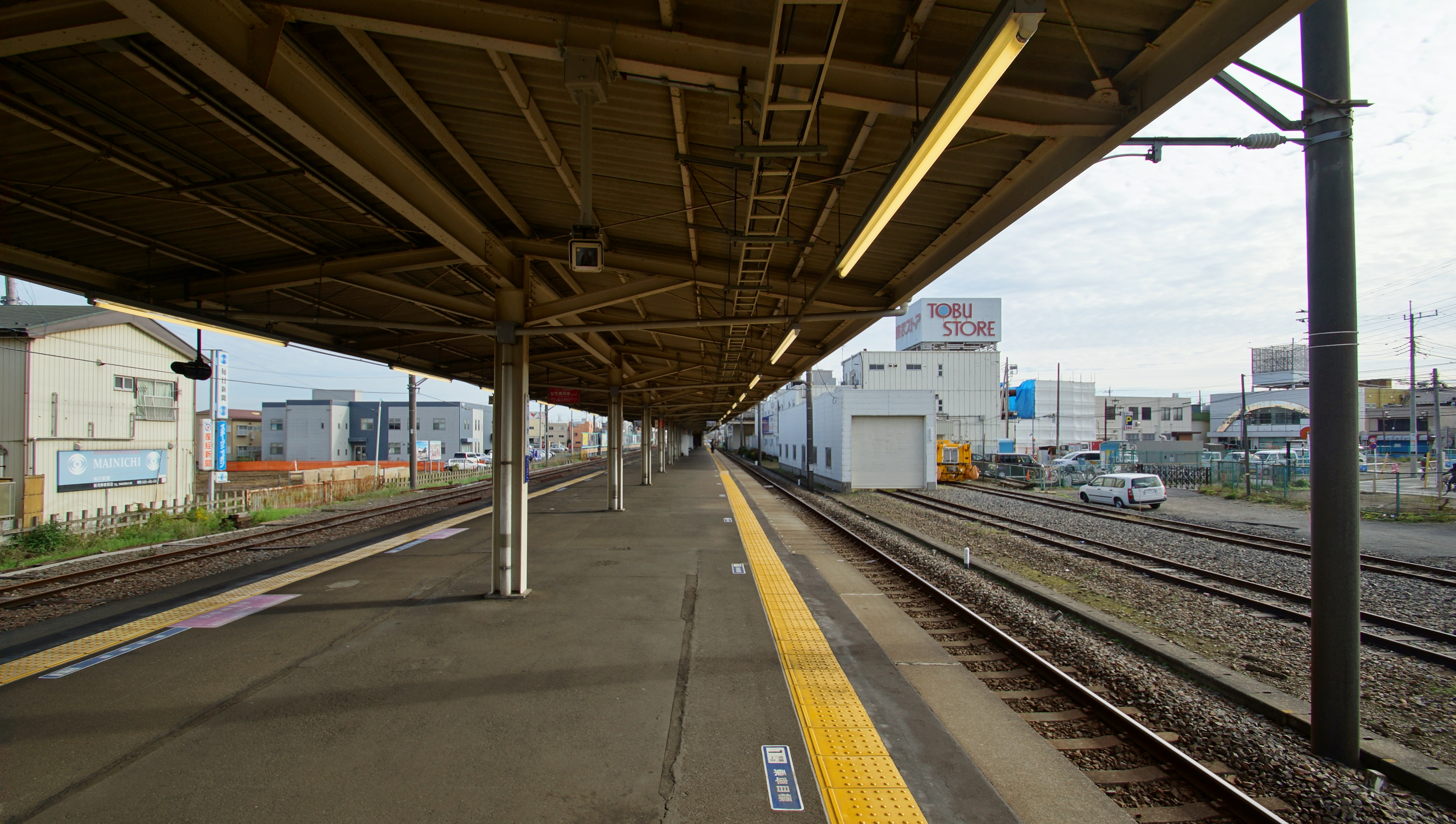
The platforms from the down (Kawagoe) end in November 2015

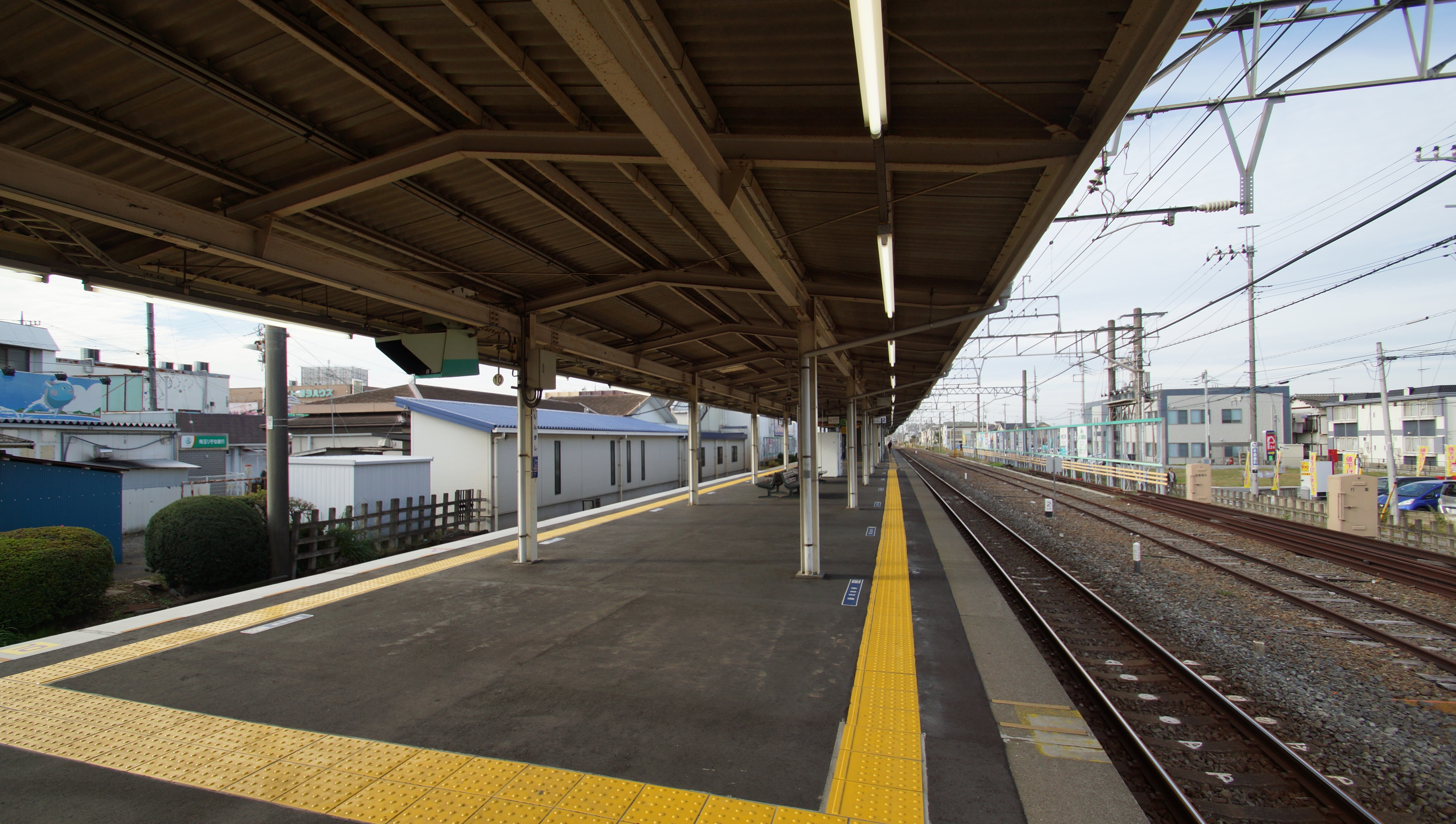
The platforms from the up (Ikebukuro) end in November 2015

== History ==
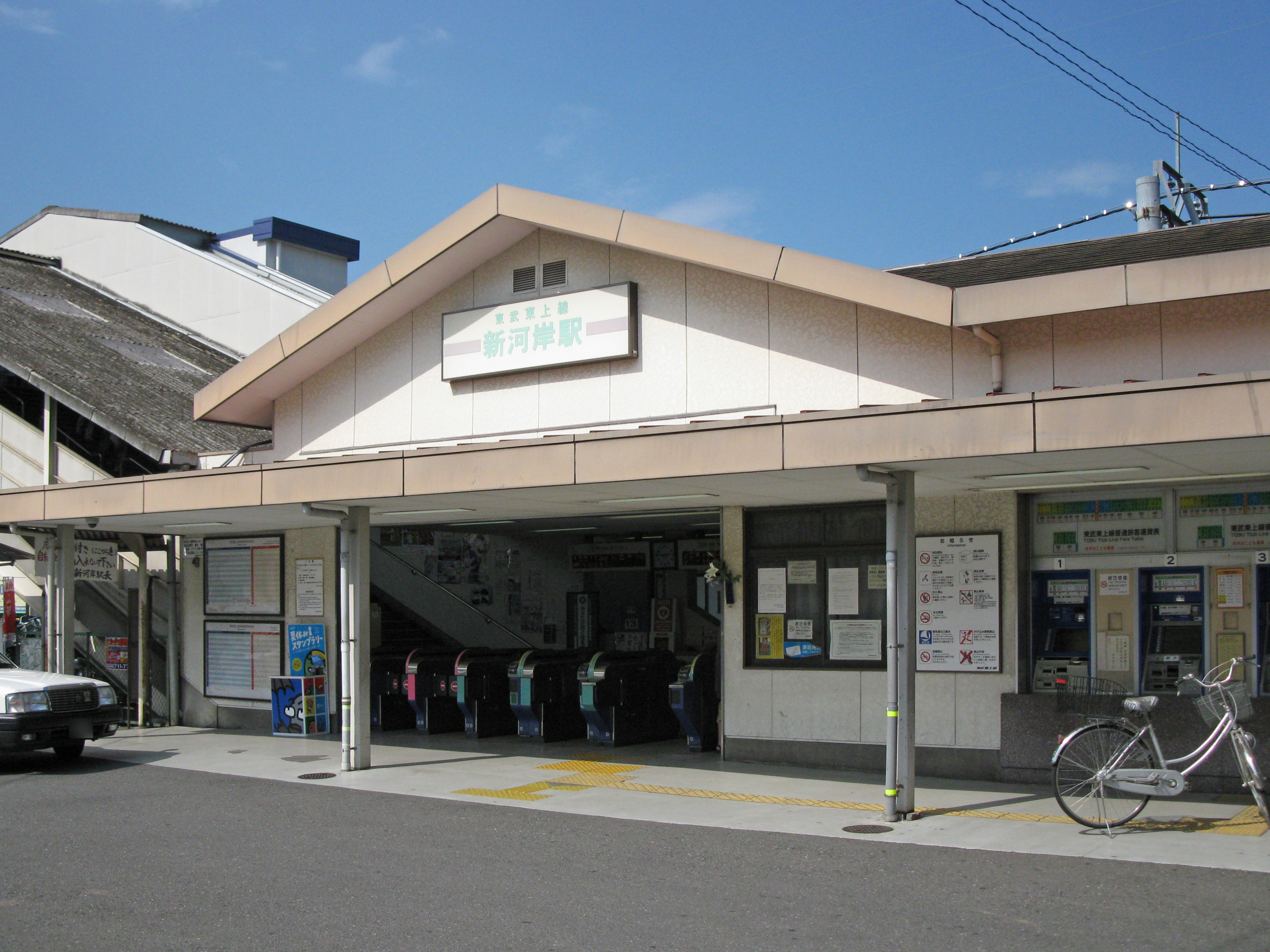
The station entrance in August 2009

The station opened on 17 June 1914, initially named Takashina Station (高階駅). It was renamed Shingashi on 27 October 1916.

Through-running to and from Shibuya via the Tokyo Metro Fukutoshin Line commenced on 14 June 2008.

From 17 March 2012, station numbering was introduced on the Tōbu Tōjō Line, with Shingashi Station becoming "TJ-20".

Through-running to and from Yokohama and Motomachi-Chukagai via the Tokyu Toyoko Line and Minatomirai Line commenced on 16 March 2013.

Through running to and from Shin-Yokohama and Shōnandai via the Tōkyū Shin-yokohama Line, Sōtetsu Shin-yokohama Line, Sōtetsu Main Line, and Sōtetsu Izumino Line commenced on 18 March 2023.

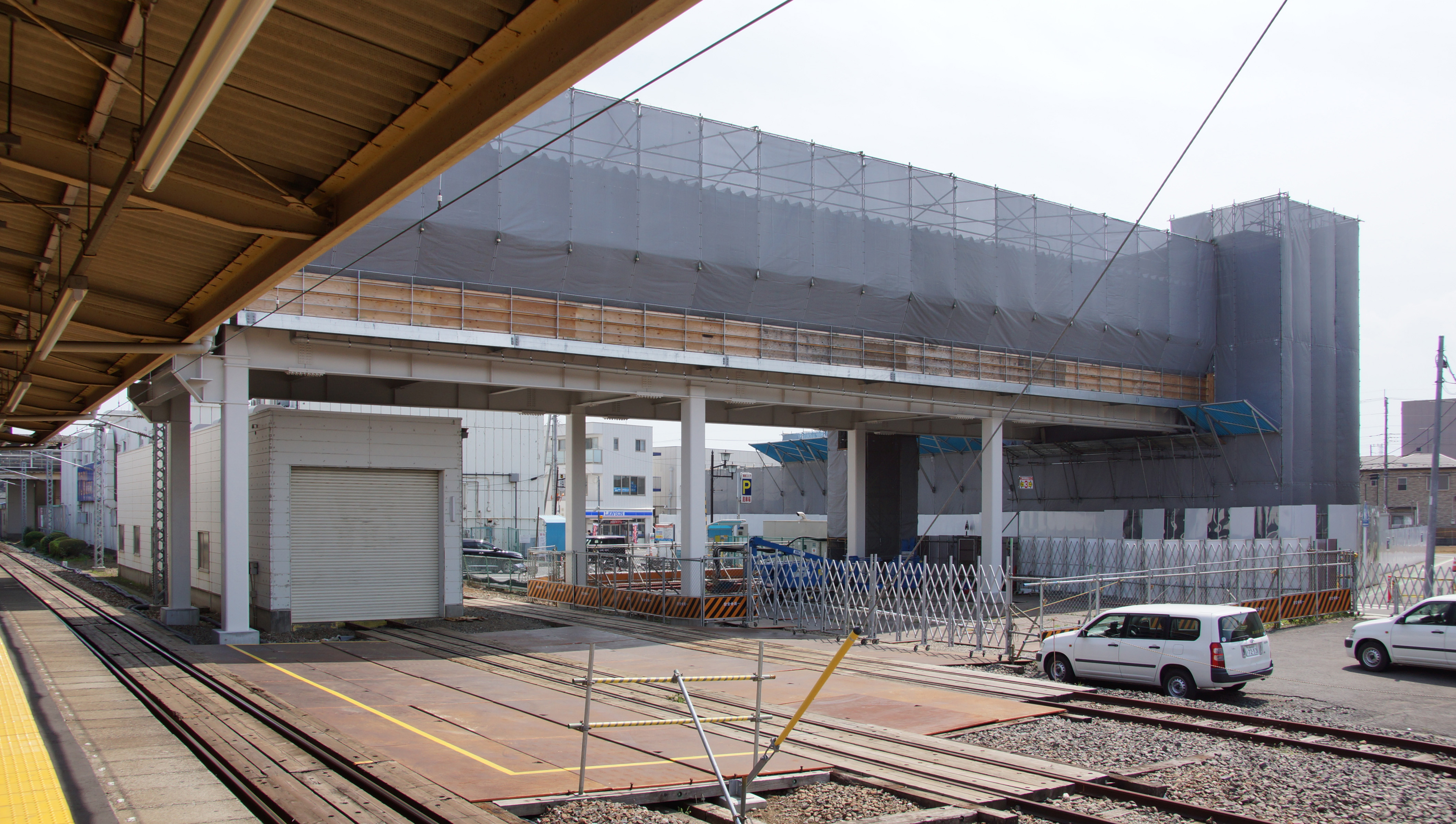
The new overhead station building under construction in April 2017

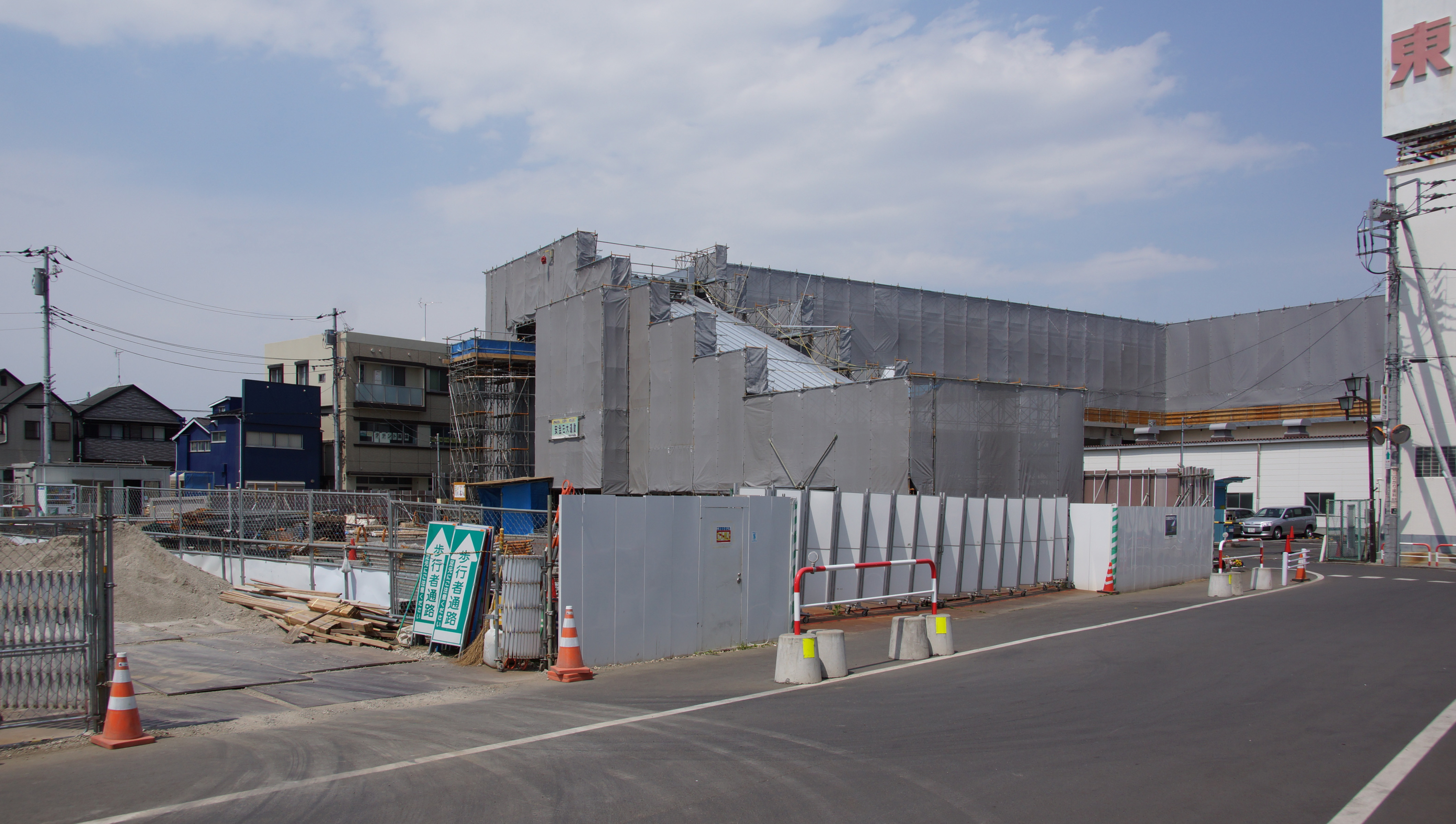
The new station building and west forecourt under construction in April 2017

== Passenger statistics ==
In fiscal 2019, the station was used by an average of 25,833 passengers daily.

== Surrounding area ==
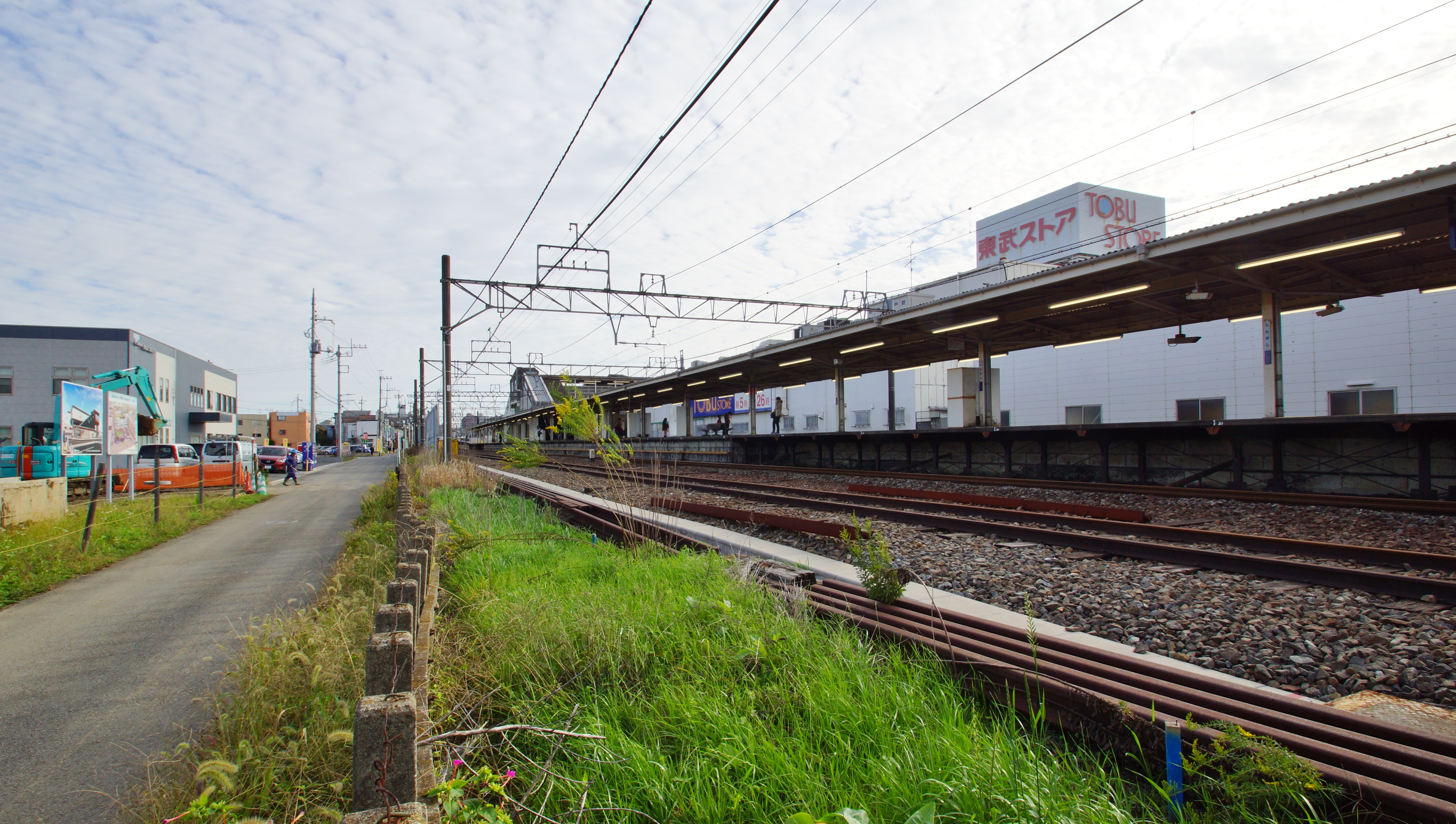
The east side of the station in November 2015

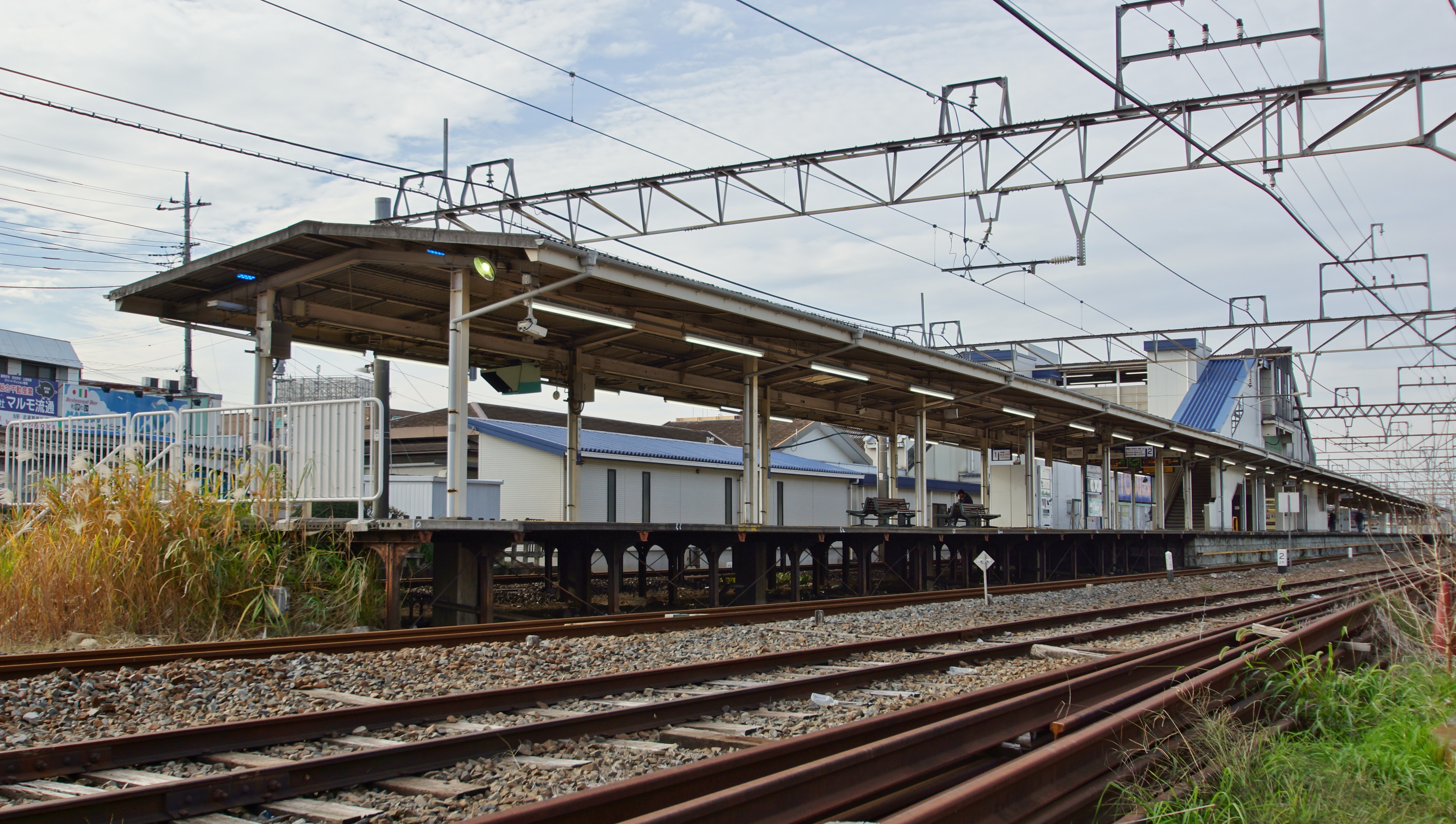
The east side of the station in November 2015

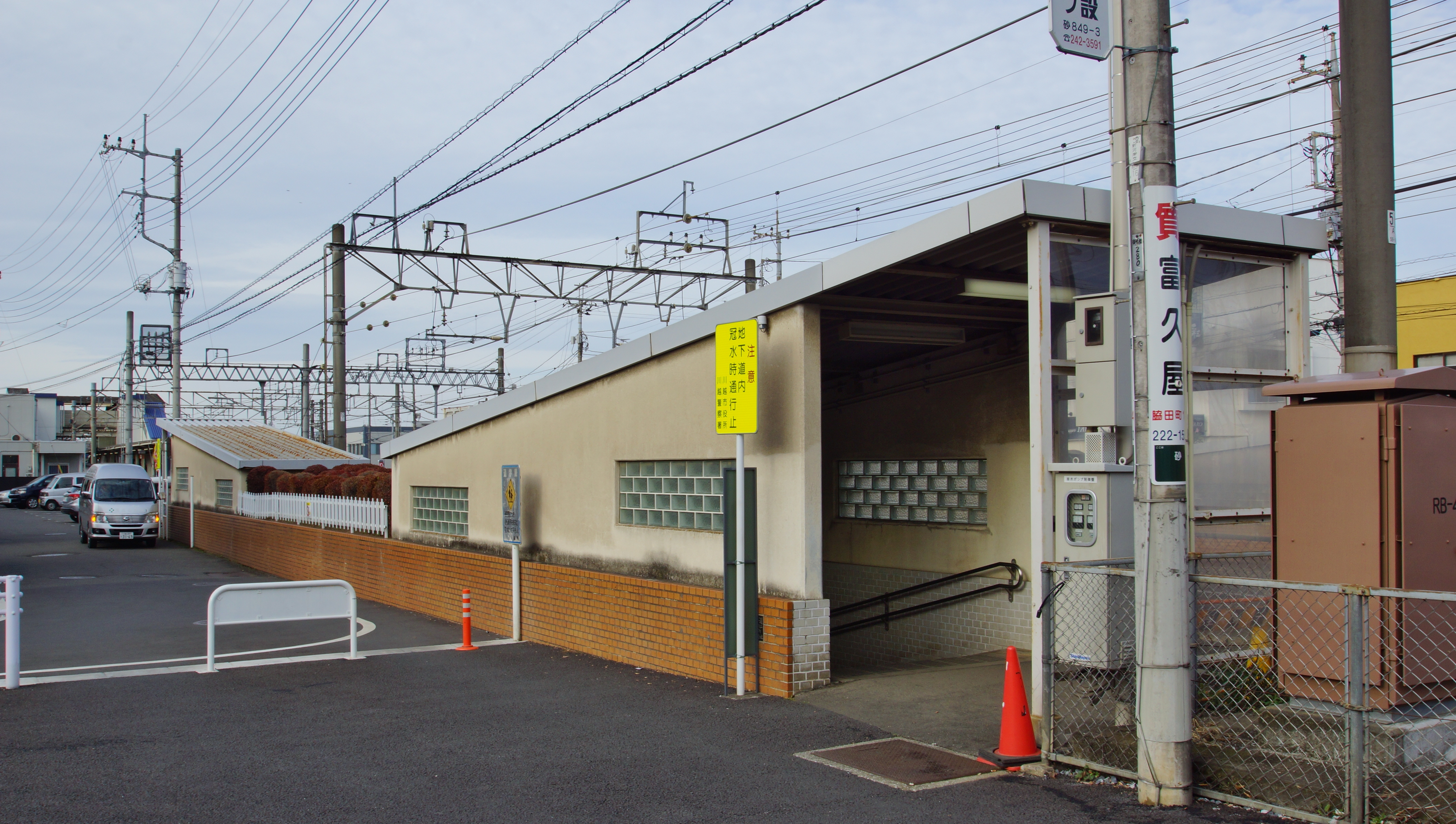
The underpass at the south end of the station in November 2015

== See also ==
- List of railway stations in Japan
