= Ampco Metal =

Swiss alloy manufacturer

AMPCO METAL
- Company type: Private company
- Founded: 1914 (Milwaukee, Wisconsin)
- Headquarters: Marly, Switzerland, CH
- Key people: Luis Bento, Managing Director
- Products: copper alloys
- Number of employees: 250
- Website: www.ampcometal.com

AMPCO METAL is a diversified speciality alloy engineering company working primarily in copper based alloys, non-sparking safety tools and speciality welding products. The Switzerland based company is a manufacturer of engineered alloys of different compositions and properties, intended for specific uses in the aerospace, automotive, energy conservation, manufacturing and other industries.

== Divisions ==
- AMPCO METAL is a speciality copper alloy producer. The company's alloy engineering department develops a variety of alloys with exact properties to satisfy the requirements of specific fields, including the aerospace, automotive, machining, welding and plastics injection-moulding industries.
- AMPCO METAL S.A. (Switzerland) Corporate Headquarters
- AMPCO Metal Inc. (USA) Production foundry, distribution center and sales office
- METAL INDUSTRIEL AMPCO Investissements SAS (France) Production foundry, distribution center and sales office
- AMPCO Metal S.A (Belgium) Machine shop and sales office for Benelux
- AMPCO METAL SAS (France) sales office
- AMPCO Metal Deutschland GmbH (Germany) Machine shop and sales office
- AMPCO Metal Kft (Hungary) Sales office for Eastern Europe and Russia
- AMPCO Metal Srl (Italy) Sales office
- AMPCO EDSC (European Distribution Service Center) (Netherlands) Distribution center for EU
- AMPCO Metal Sp. z o.o. (Poland) Sales office
- AMPCO Metal Portugal, Lda. (Portugal) Sales office
- AMPCO Metal España (Spain) Sales office
- Ampco Metal Ltd (United Kingdom) Sales office
- Ampco Metal (Foshan) Co. Ltd. (China) Distribution center and sales offices
- Ampco Metal (Xian) Co. Ltd. (China) Distribution center and sales offices

== History ==
The American Metal Products Company was founded on June 6, 1914, in Milwaukee, WI by inventor August Littman, with a small group of other entrepreneurs. The company's first product was a specially-formulated bronze alloy hard enough to cut steel, aptly named Bronze — a name derived from the new company's own identity. An early version of the company's present diamond-shaped logo saw the day. It has remained in use in substantially the same recognizable format ever since. The American Metal Products Company slowly expanded its activities into the production of aluminium bronze alloys as sand castings, forgings and centrifugal castings.

The company was renamed "AMPCO METAL" in 1930, by which time it had built itself a reputation as a reliable producer of high quality alloys. The Second World War strongly increased the demand for copper-based alloys and industrial bronzes, especially in the field of aeronautics. By 1944, manufacturing operations had grown from 100 to 2,500 employees, and every American airplane carried AMPCO METAL parts somewhere in its structure—in its engines, landing gear, propellers or airframe. In the marine environment, AMPCO METAL propellers were manufactured for landing barges and ships, and generally, AMPCO METAL alloys could be found in most sectors of military operations. Innovation was an important part of company philosophy from the outset. From 1922 onward into the 1970s, intensive research was done on the development of special non-sparking, non-magnetic hand tools for highly specialised fields such as the petroleum and natural gas industries, fire fighting and prevention, and the non-ferrous-metal welding sector. Centrifugally-cast bronzes, special hard bronzes for tooling and die applications, nickel-aluminium bronzes, high-strength aeronautical alloys as well as high-conductivity welding electrodes were all flagship products in these diverse industries.
