= 北 =

北, meaning "north", may refer to:

- Kita (surname), a Japanese surname
- A given name (pronounced Běi in Mandarin and Puk in Korean)
  - Ch'oe Puk (fl. 1755–85), Joseon Dynasty painter
  - Law Pak (born 1929), Hong Kong football coach

== See also ==
- Bei River, tributary of the Pearl River in southern China
- Buk-gu (disambiguation), various districts in South Korea
- Kita-ku (disambiguation), various districts in Japan
