= Northern Districts =

Northern Districts may refer to:

- Northern Districts Cricket Club, in Adelaide, Australia
- Northern Districts men's cricket team, part of the New Zealand Cricket body
- Northern Districts women's cricket team, part of the New Zealand Cricket body
- Northern Districts (ku) in Japan, see Kita-ku (disambiguation)
- Northern Districts (gu) in Korea, see Buk-gu (disambiguation)

== See also ==
- Northern District (disambiguation)
