= 北區 =

北區 (pinyin: Běiqū; Hanja for Hangul: 북구 Buk-gu) or 北区 (Japanese: Kita-ku) may refer to:

== Japan ==
- Kita-ku, Hamamatsu
- Kita-ku, Kobe
- Kita-ku, Kumamoto
- Kita-ku, Kyoto
- Kita-ku, Nagoya
- Kita-ku, Niigata
- Kita-ku, Osaka
- Kita-ku, Saitama
- Kita-ku, Sakai
- Kita-ku, Sapporo
- Kita, Tokyo

== South Korea ==
- Buk-gu, Pohang
- Buk District, Ulsan
- Buk District, Busan
- Buk District, Daegu
- Buk District, Gwangju

== Taiwan ==
- North District, Hsinchu
- North District, Taichung
- North District, Tainan

== Hong Kong ==
- North District, Hong Kong

== See also ==
- Northern District (disambiguation)
