= Nishi-ku, Saitama =

Nishi-ku, Saitama 西区
- Ward
- Nishi Ward
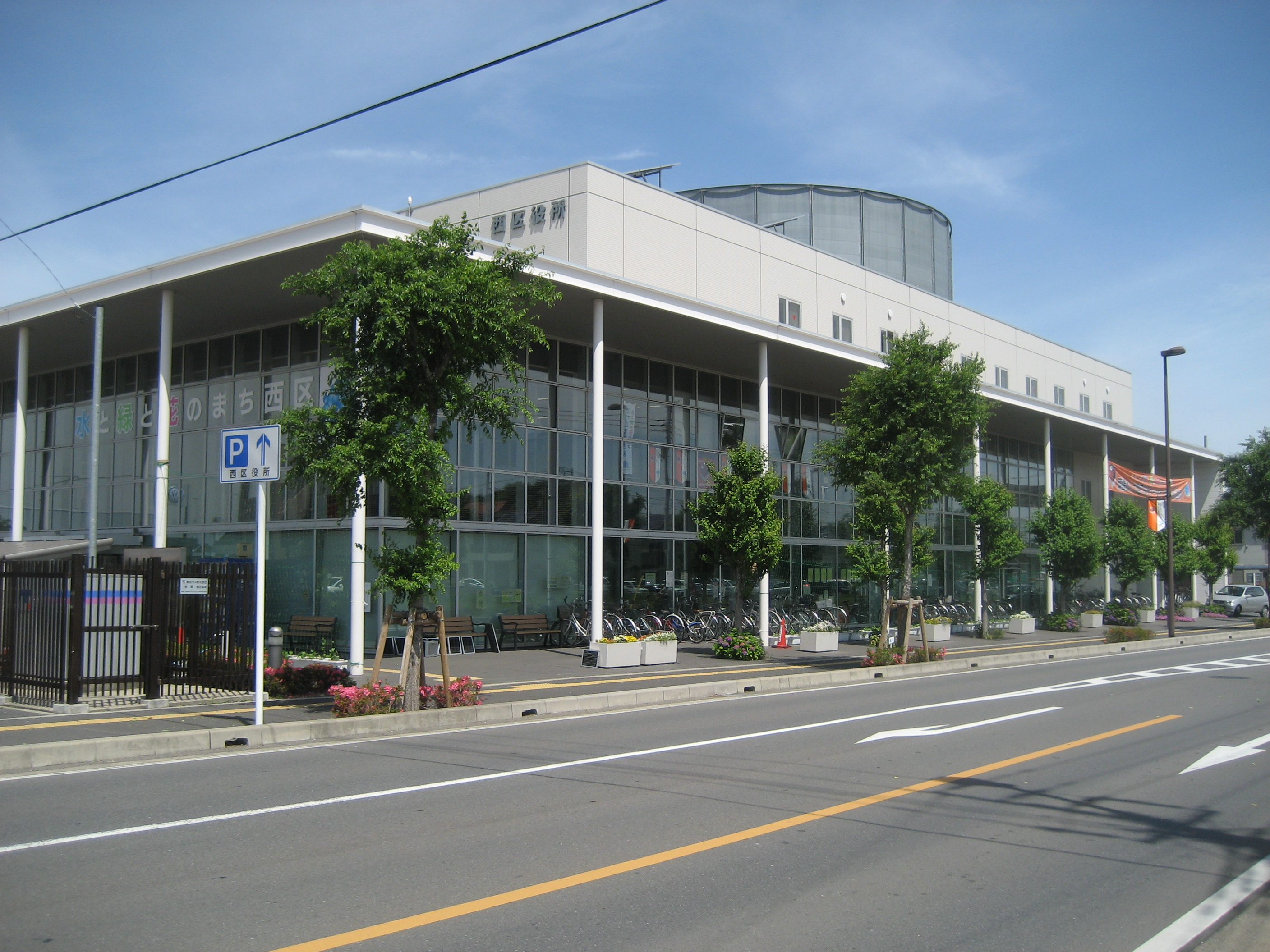
- Nishi Ward Office, Saitama City

- Seal

- Location of Nishi-ku in Saitama

- Coordinates: 35°55′30.7″N 139°34′46.7″E
- Country: Japan
- Region: Kantō
- Prefecture: Saitama
- City: Saitama

Area
  - Total: 29.12 km^{2} (11.24 sq mi)

Population (March 2021)
  - Total: 93,527
  - Density: 3,212/km^{2} (8,318/sq mi)
- Time zone: UTC+9 (Japan Standard Time)
- -Flower: Hydrangea macrophylla
- Phone number: 048-835-3156
- Address: 3743 Sashiougi, Nishi-ku, Saitama-shi, Saitama-ken 331-8587
- Website: Official website

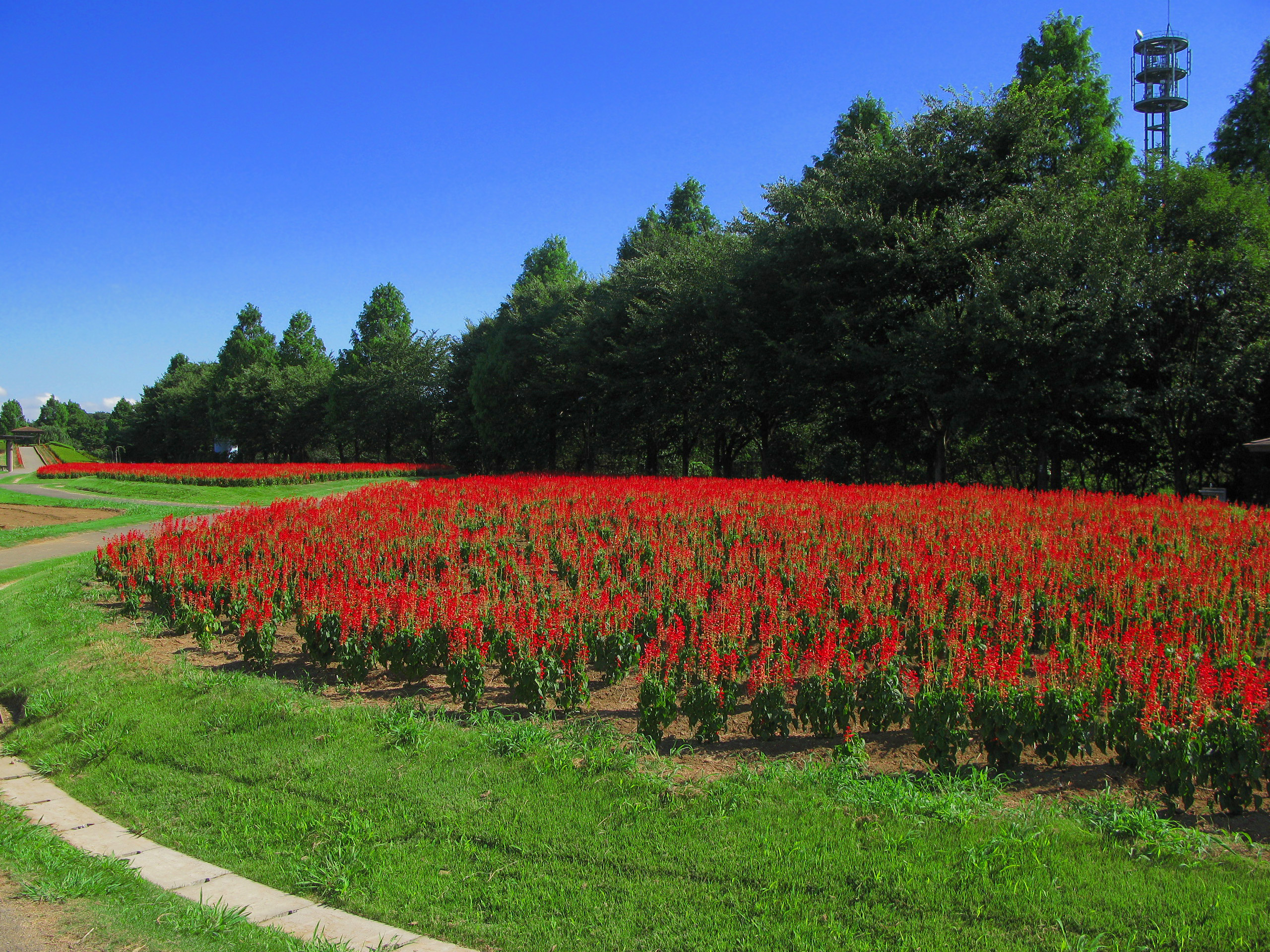
Ōmiya Hana-no-oka Norin Park

Nishi-ku (西区, Nishi-ku) is one of ten wards of Saitama, in Saitama Prefecture, Japan, and is located in the far western part of the city. As of 1 March 2021, the ward had an estimated population of 93,527 and a population density of 3200 persons per km^{2}. Its total area was 29.14 square kilometres (11.25 sq mi).

== Geography ==
Nishi-ward is located on the extreme western side of Saitama.

=== Neighboring Municipalities ===
Saitama Prefecture:

- Ageo
- Kawagoe
- Fujimi
- Kita-ku
- Ōmiya-ku
- Sakura-ku

== History ==
The villages of Sashiougi, Mamiya, Uemizu, Nisshin and Mihashi were created within Kitaadachi District, Saitama, with the establishment of the municipalities system on April 1, 1889. Nisshin and Mihashi were merged with Ōmiya Town in 1940, becoming part of the city of Ōmiya. In 1955, Ōmiya annexed Sashiougi, Mamiya, and Uemizu. On May 1, 2001, Ōmiya merged with Urawa and Yono cities to form the new city of Saitama. When Saitama was proclaimed a designated city in 2003, the far western portion of former Ōmiya became Nishi Ward.

== Education ==
Nishi-ku has eight elementary schools, six junior high schools, four high schools and one special education school.

Public junior high schools:

- Mamiya (馬宮中学校)
- Miyamae (宮前中学校)
- Omiya Nishi (大宮西中学校)
- Sashiogi (指扇中学校)
- Tsuchiya (土屋中学校)
- Uemizu (植水中学校)

Municipal elementary schools:

- Mamiya Higashi (馬宮東小学校)
- Mamiyanishi (馬宮西小学校)
- Miyamae (宮前小学校)
- Omiya Nishi (大宮西小学校)
- Sakae (栄小学校)
- Sashiogi (指扇小学校)
- Sashiogi Kita (指扇北小学校)
- Uemizu (植水小学校)

== Transportation ==
=== Railway ===
JR East – Kawagoe Line

- Nishi-Ōmiya - Sashiōgi

=== Highway ===
- National Route 16
- National Route 17
