= Northern District =

Northern District or North District may refer to several places:

== Asia ==
- North District, Hong Kong
- North District, Hsinchu City, Taiwan
- North District, Tainan, Tainan
- North District, Taichung, Taiwan
- Northern Districts (ku) in Japan, see Kita-ku (disambiguation)
- Northern Districts (gu) in Korea, see Buk-gu (disambiguation)

== Australia ==
- North District, Western Australia, an obsolete administrative division of the Colony of Western Australia
- Northern District (South Australian Legislative Council), an electoral district 1882–1975
- Northern District Cricket Club, a cricket club based in Northern Sydney

== Europe and Middle East ==
- Northern District (Israel)
- Northern District, Malta
- Northern District, Riga, Latvia
- Severny District, name of various places in Russia (Severny in Russian means "Northern")

== North America ==
Several internal divisions within states of the United States:

- Northern District of Illinois
- Northern District of Iowa
- Northern District of New York
- Northern District of Texas

== See also ==
- 北区 (disambiguation)
- Northern Districts (disambiguation)
