= Kawagoe Line =

Railway line in Saitama prefecture, Japan

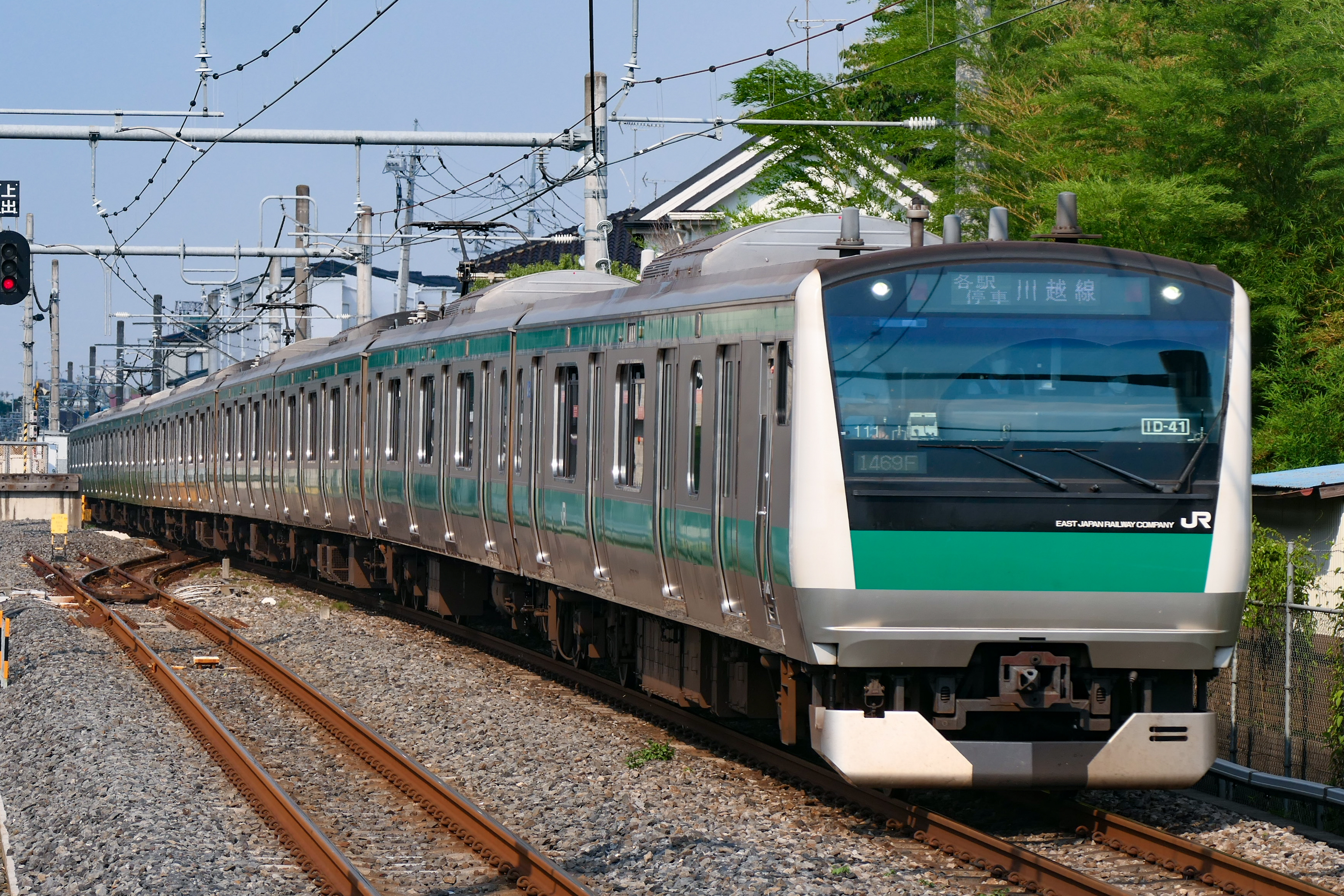
- E233-7000 series EMU operating on the Kawagoe Line

Overview
- Native name: 川越線
- Owner: JR East
- Locale: Saitama Prefecture
- Termini: Ōmiya; Komagawa
- Stations: 11

Service
- Depot: Kawagoe

History
- Opened: 22 July 1940; 86 years ago

Technical
- Line length: 30.6 km (19.0 mi)
- Track gauge: 1,067 mm (3 ft 6 in)
- Electrification: Overhead line, 1,500 V DC
Route map

The Kawagoe Line (Japanese: 川越線, Hepburn: Kawagoe-sen) is a railway line in Japan operated by the East Japan Railway Company (JR East), which connects the cities of Saitama, Kawagoe, and Hidaka in Saitama Prefecture. The main transfer stations on the line are Ōmiya, Kawagoe, and Komagawa.

== Services ==
The eastern section between Kawagoe and Ōmiya operates as an extension of the Saikyō Line, which runs between Ōmiya and Ōsaki in central Tokyo, using 10-car electric multiple unit (EMU) trains. Most trains continue through Ōsaki to Shin-Kiba via the Rinkai Line or to Ebina via the Saikyō, Shōnan-Shinjuku, and Sōtetsu Shin-Yokohama lines.

The western section between Kawagoe and Komagawa uses shorter four-car EMU trains, with about half of the trains continuing to Hachiōji via the Hachikō Line.

Because the two sections use different train lengths, there is no regular through service between Komagawa and Ōmiya. Except for a few rush-hour services that originate or terminate at Minami-Furuya, trains from Komagawa terminate at Kawagoe, as do trains from Ōmiya in the opposite direction. Passengers traveling beyond Kawagoe must change trains there.

== Station list ==
- All stations are located in Saitama Prefecture.
- Passengers bound for Ōmiya or Komagawa must change trains at Kawagoe. However, during early mornings and evenings, some trains leaving Kawagoe depot provide service from Minami-Furuya to Komagawa.
- All rapid or commuter rapid trains to/from the Saikyo Line stop at every station on the Kawagoe Line.
- Trains can pass each other at stations marked "∥", "∨", and "◇"; they cannot pass at stations marked "｜".

=== Saitama – Kawagoe ===
Station	Distance in km (mi)		Transfers	Track layout	Location	
Station	Between stations	Total	Transfers	Track layout	Location	
↑ Through-running to/from ↑ Shin-Kiba via the Saikyō and Rinkai lines Ebina via the Saikyō, Shōnan-Shinjuku and Sōtetsu Shin-Yokohama lines
Ōmiya 大宮	—N/a	from Ōsaki: 36.9 (22.9) 0 (0)	Saikyo Line (through service); Tōhoku Shinkansen (Hokkaido, Akita, Yamagata); Jōetsu Shinkansen; Hokuriku Shinkansen; Keihin–Tōhoku Line (JK47); Utsunomiya Line/Takasaki Line (JU07); Shōnan–Shinjuku Line (JS24); Tōbu Urban Park Line (TD01); New Shuttle (NS01)	∥	Ōmiya-ku	Saitama
Nisshin 日進	3.7 (2.3)	3.7 (2.3)		∨	Kita-ku	Saitama
Nishi-Ōmiya 西大宮	2.6 (1.6)	6.3 (3.9)		◇	Nishi-ku	Saitama
Sashiōgi 指扇	1.4 (0.87)	7.7 (4.8)		◇	Nishi-ku	Saitama
Minami-Furuya 南古谷	4.7 (2.9)	12.4 (7.7)		◇	Kawagoe	
Kawagoe 川越	3.7 (2.3)	16.1 (10.0)	■ Kawagoe Line (to Komagawa); Tobu Tojo Line; Seibu Shinjuku Line (at Hon-Kawagoe)	◇	Kawagoe	

=== Kawagoe – Komagawa ===
Station	Distance in km (mi)		Transfers	Track layout	Location
Station	Between stations	Total	Transfers	Track layout	Location
Kawagoe 川越	3.7 (2.3)	16.1 (10.0)	■ Kawagoe Line (to Ōmiya); Tobu Tojo Line; Seibu Shinjuku Line (at Hon-Kawagoe)	◇	Kawagoe
Nishi-Kawagoe 西川越	2.6 (1.6)	18.7 (11.6)		|	Kawagoe
Matoba 的場	2.2 (1.4)	20.9 (13.0)		◇	Kawagoe
Kasahata 笠幡	2.9 (1.8)	23.8 (14.8)		|	Kawagoe
Musashi-Takahagi 武蔵高萩	3.2 (2.0)	27.0 (16.8)		◇	Hidaka
Komagawa 高麗川	3.6 (2.2)	30.6 (19.0)	■ Hachiko Line (through service)	◇	Hidaka
↓ Through-running to/from Hachiōji via the Hachiko Line ↓

== Rolling stock ==
- JR East E233-7000 series 10-car EMUs x 38 (Kawagoe Line/Saikyo Line/TWR Rinkai Line services since 30 June 2013)
- JR East 209-3500 series 4-car EMUs x 5 (Kawagoe Line/Hachiko Line services since 7 May 2018)
- JR East E231-3000 series 4-car EMUs x 6 (Kawagoe Line/Hachiko Line services since 19 February 2018)
- TWR 70-000 series 10-car EMUs x 8 (Kawagoe Line/Saikyo Line/TWR Rinkai Line services since 1 December 2002)
- TWR 71-000 series 10-car EMUs (Kawagoe Line/Saikyo Line/TWR Rinkai Line services since 1 October 2025)

The electric multiple unit (EMU) fleet used on Kawagoe Line services is based at Kawagoe Depot (close to Minami-Furuya Station). The first of a fleet of 31 new 10-car E233-7000 series sets were introduced on Saikyo Line, Kawagoe Line, and Rinkai Line services between Kawagoe and Shin-Kiba from 30 June 2013, displacing all but one of the fleet of 205 series EMUs. The sole 205 series set was withdrawn from service in October 2016, then in 2019 seven more E233-7000 series sets entered service, bringing the total number of E233-7000's to 38.

From 2017, former E231-0 series ten-car sets based at Mitaka Depot for use on Chuo-Sobu Line services were reformed and converted to become four-car E231-3000 series sets based at Kawagoe for use on Kawagoe Line and Hachiko Line services. The first set entered revenue service on the line on 19 February 2018.

From 2018, former 209-500 series ten-car sets based at Mitaka Depot for use on Chuo-Sobu Line services were reformed and converted to become four-car 209-3500 series sets based at Kawagoe for use on Kawagoe Line and Hachiko Line services.

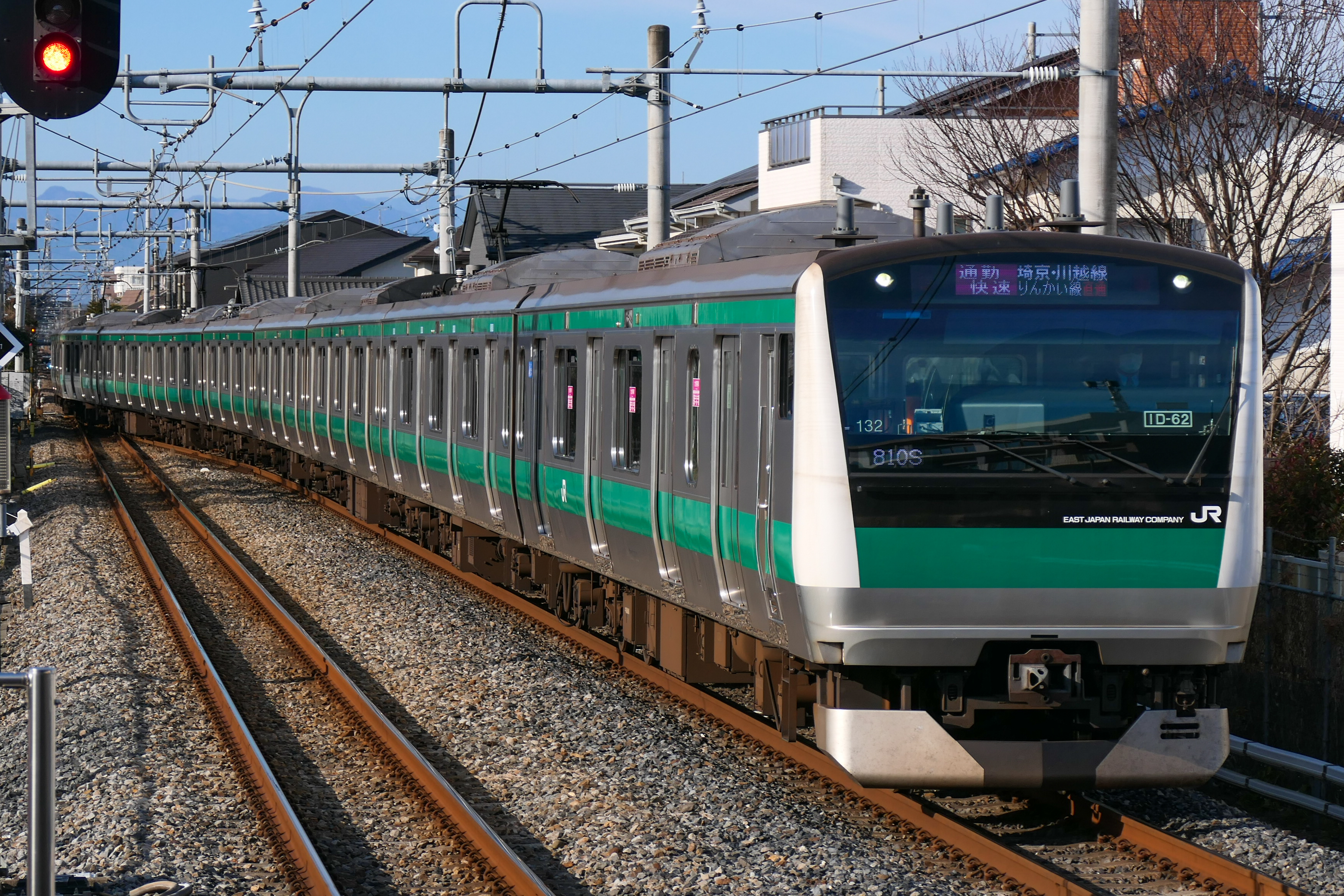
An E233-7000 series EMU January 2022

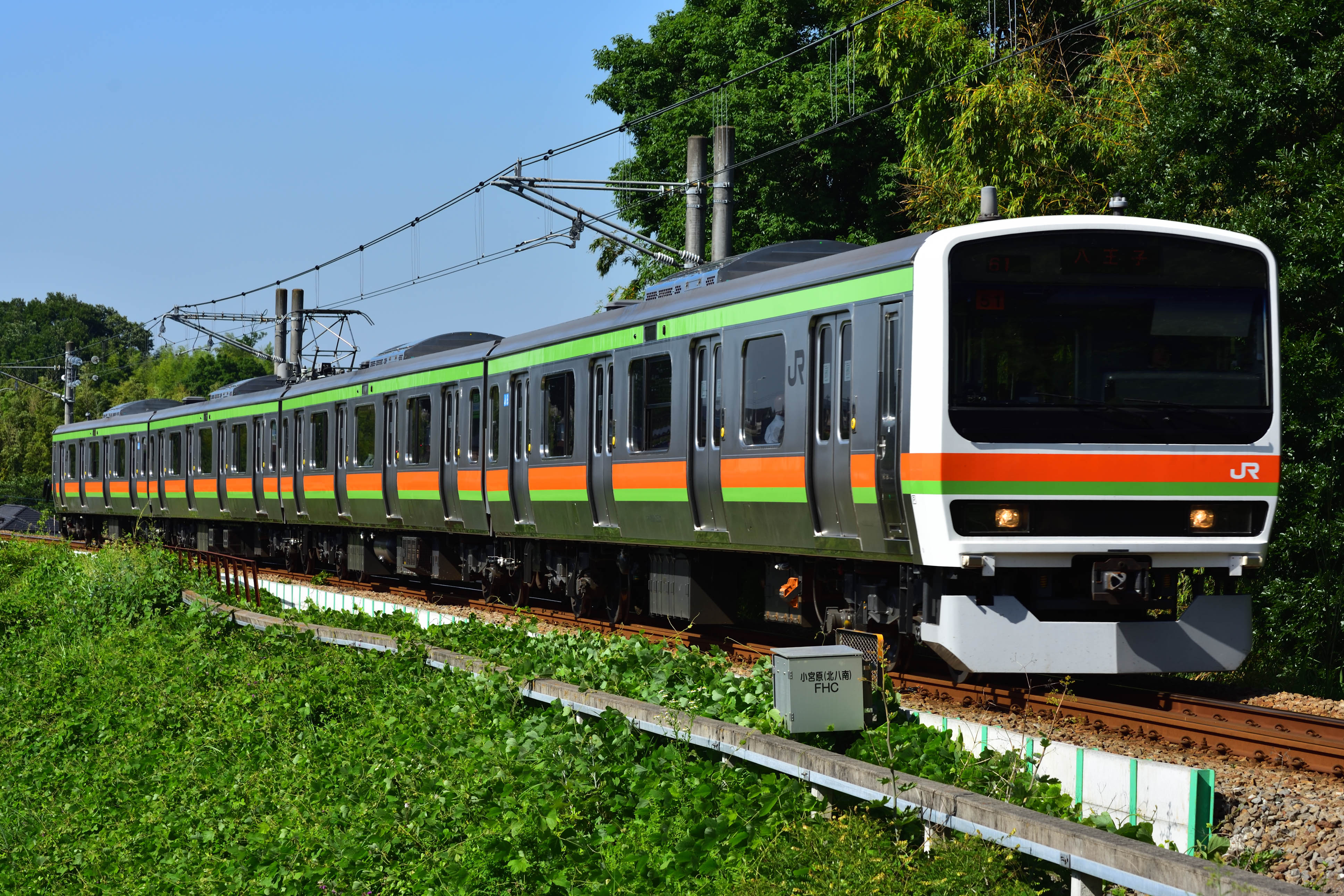
A 209-3500 series in June 2018

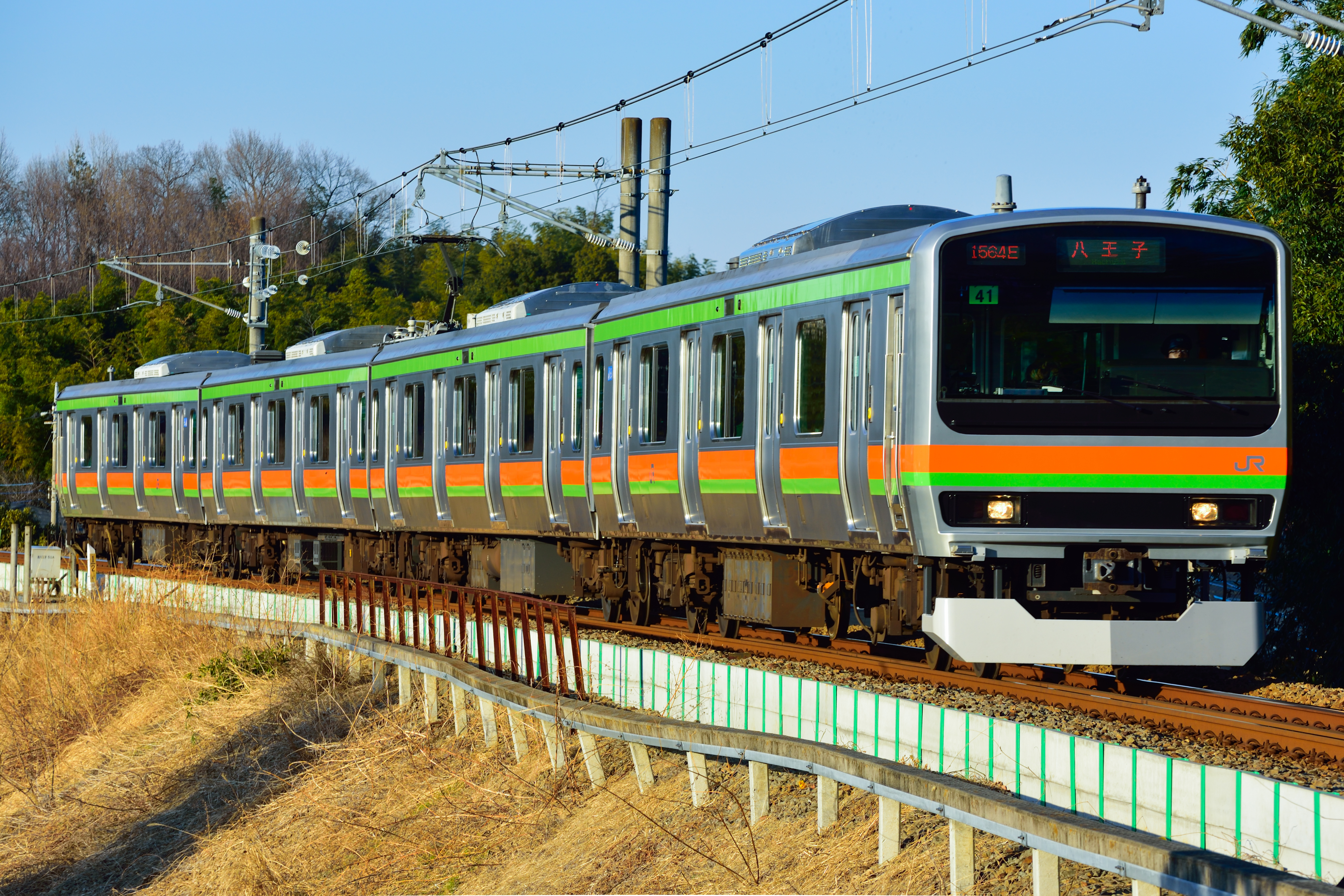
E231-3000 series in March 2018

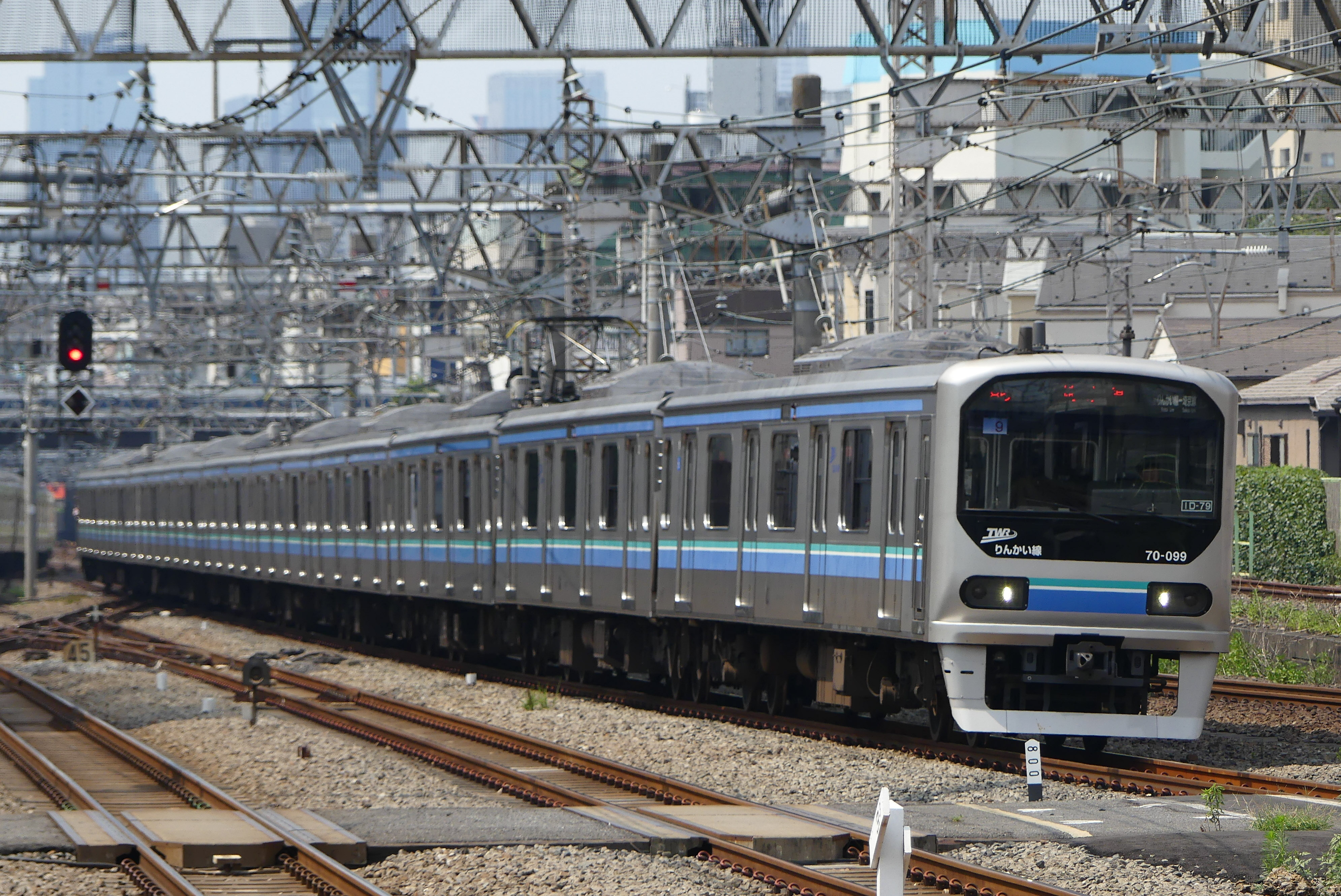
A TWR 70-000 series EMU in June 2018

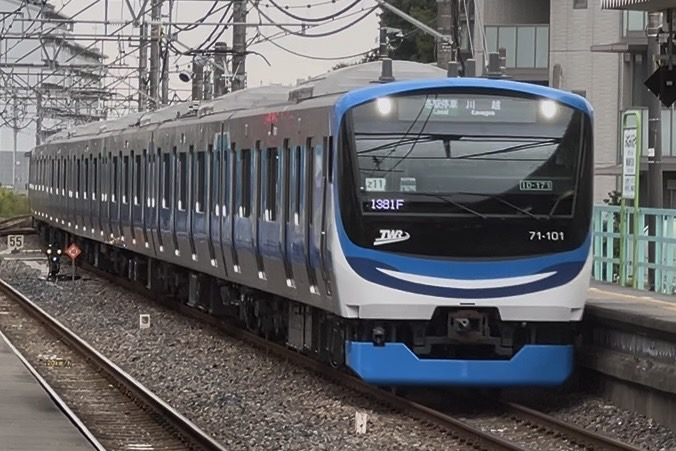
A TWR 71-000 series EMU in October 2025

=== Rolling stock previously used ===
- 9600 class steam locomotives (until September 1969)
- KiHa 07 diesel cars (from 1955)
- KiHa 15 DMUs
- KiHa 20 DMUs
- KiHa 35 DMUs (1964 – September 1985)
- 103-3000 series EMUs (from March 1985 until October 2005)
- 103-3500 series EMU (from March 1996 until March 2005)
- 205 series 10-car EMUs x 32 (Kawagoe Line/Saikyo Line/TWR Rinkai Line services until October 2016)
- 205-3000 series 4-car EMUs x 5 (Kawagoe Line/Hachikō Line services until July 2018)
- 209-3000 series 4-car EMUs x 4 (Kawagoe Line/Hachiko Line services from March 1996 until February 2019)
- 209-3100 series 4-car EMUs x 2 (Kawagoe Line/Hachiko Line services from 17 April 2005 until January 2022)

As of October 2016, all Saikyo Line 205 series sets have been removed from service.

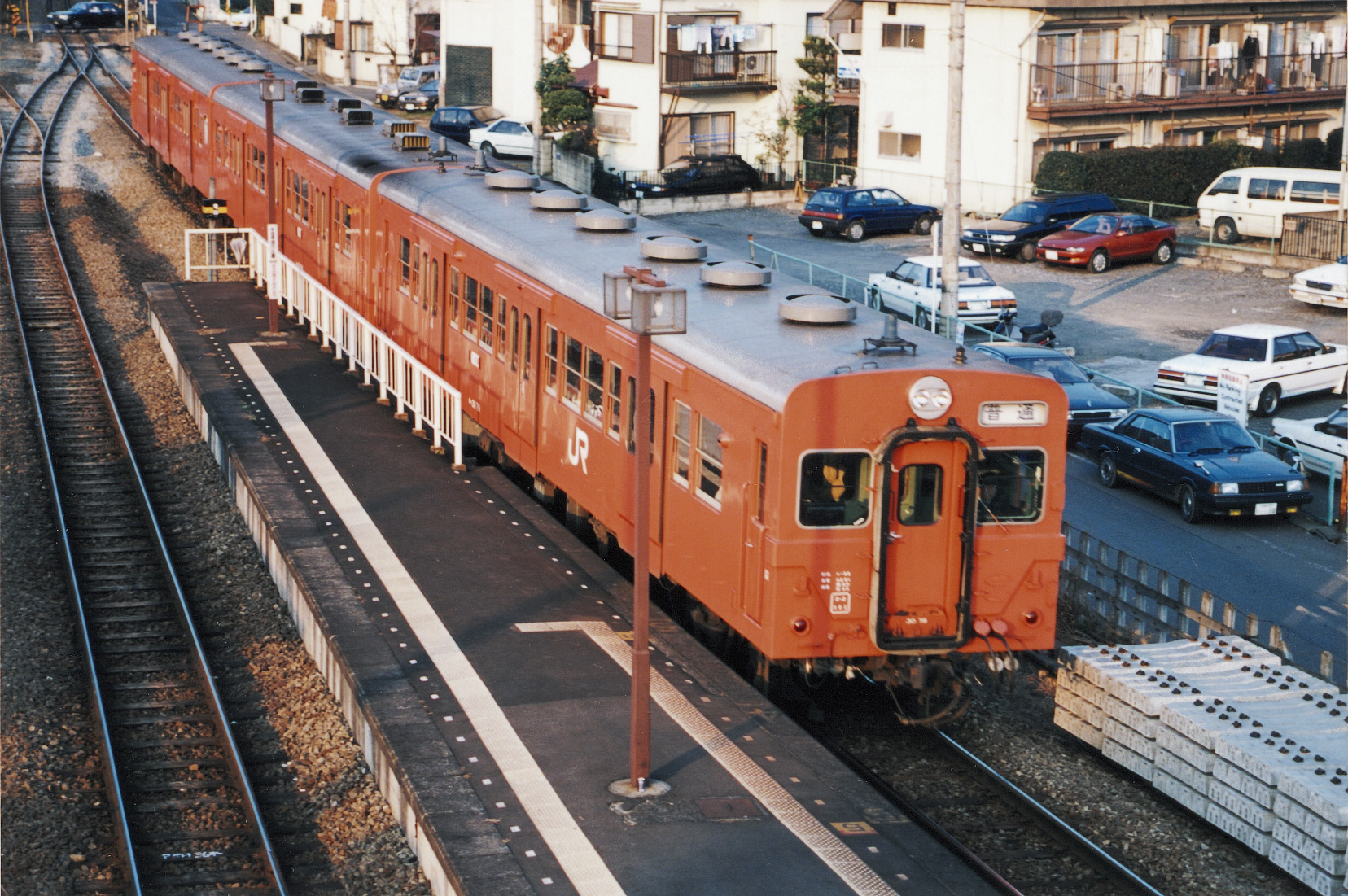
A Hachiko Line KiHa 35 series DMU

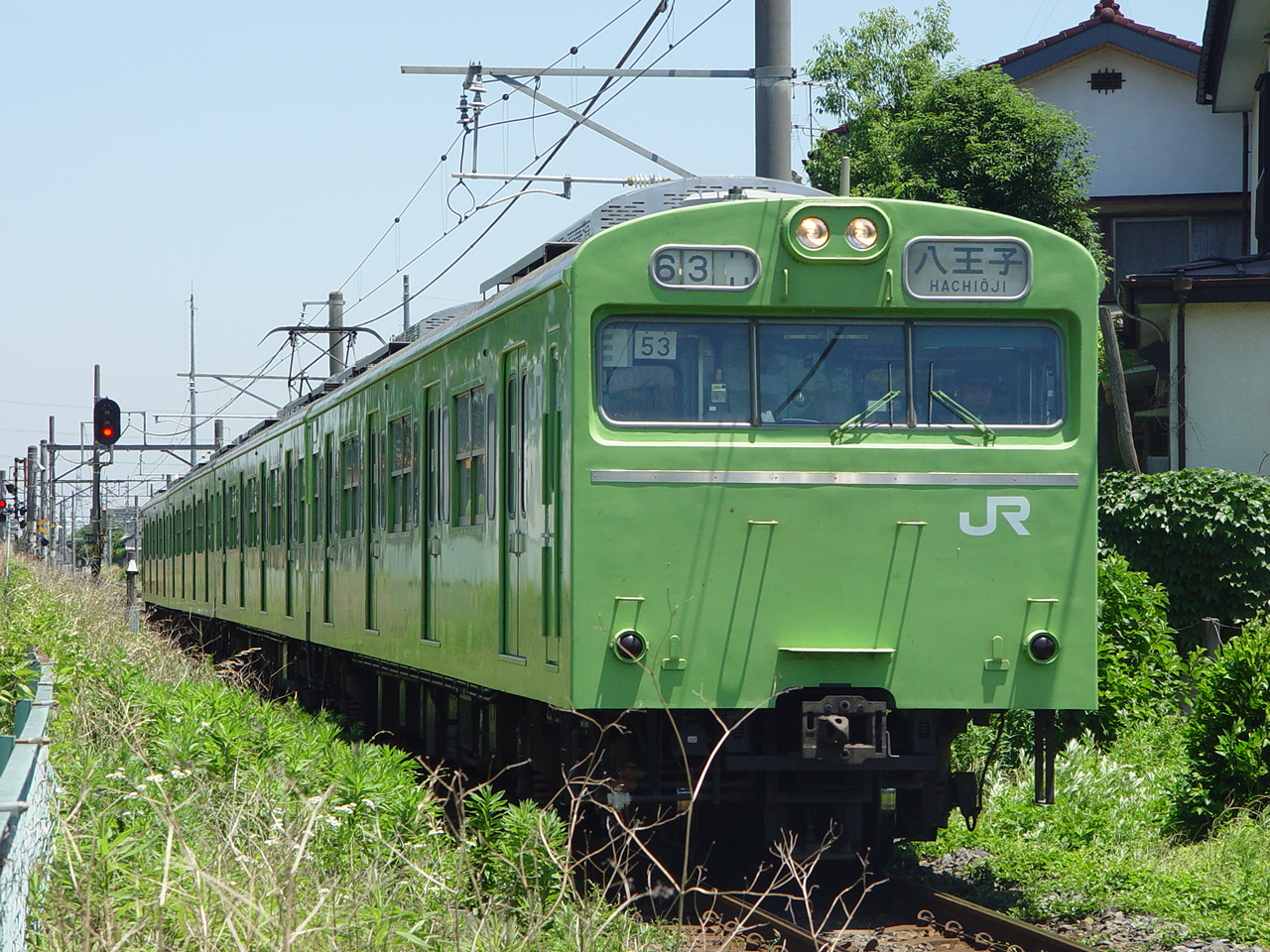
A Kawagoe Line 103-3000 series EMU, June 2004

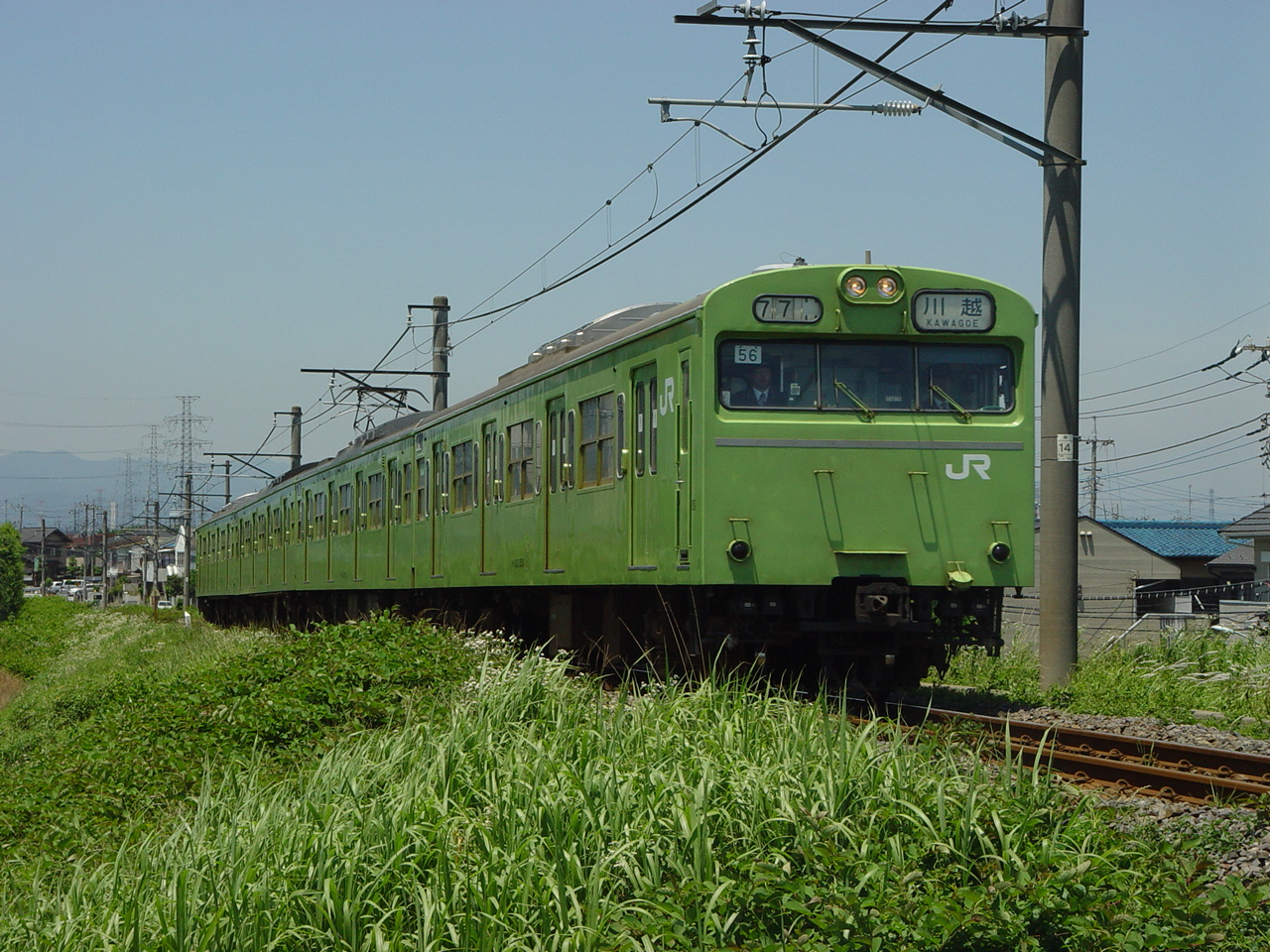
A Kawagoe Line 103-3500 series EMU, June 2004

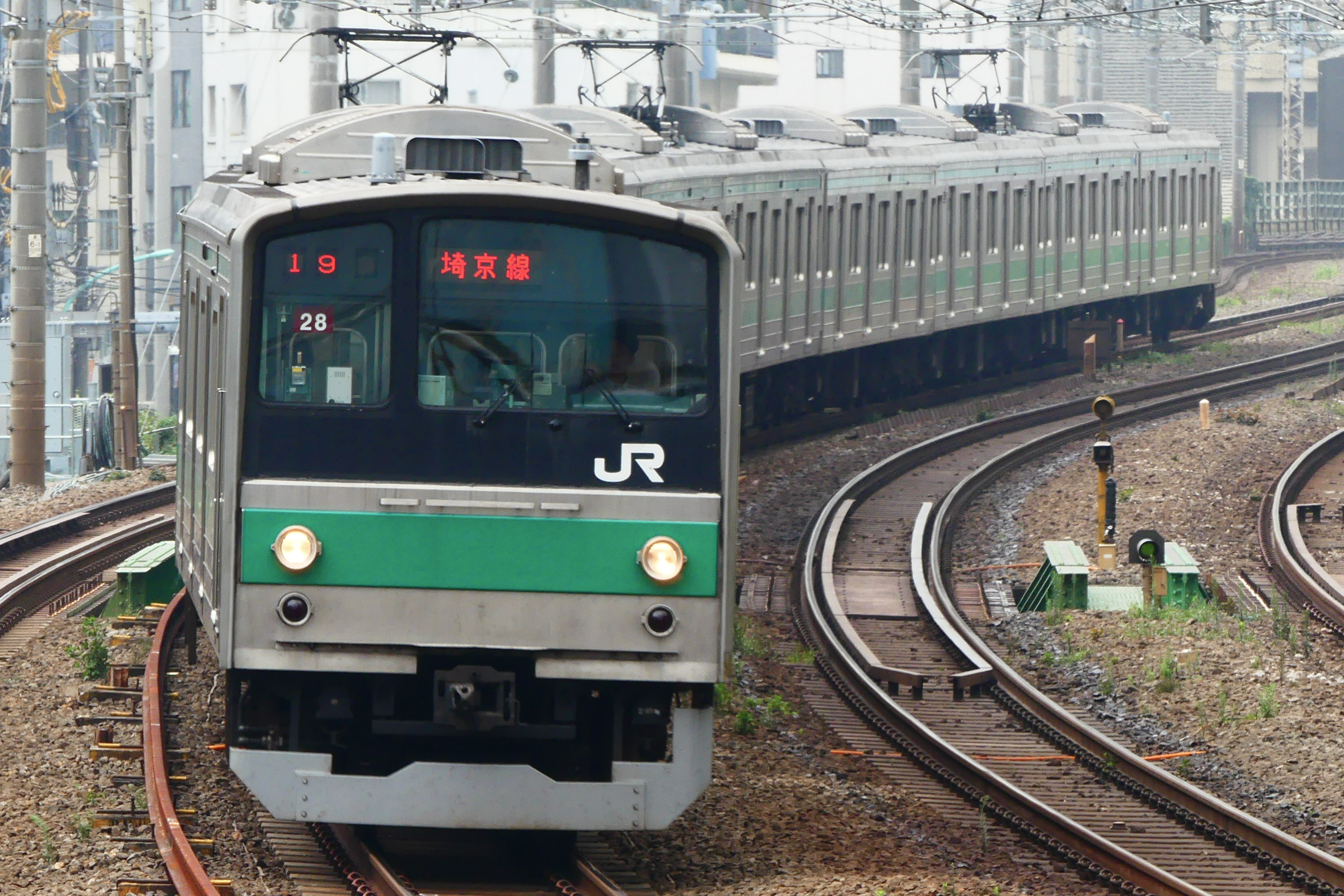
A Saikyo Line 205 series EMU in September 2016

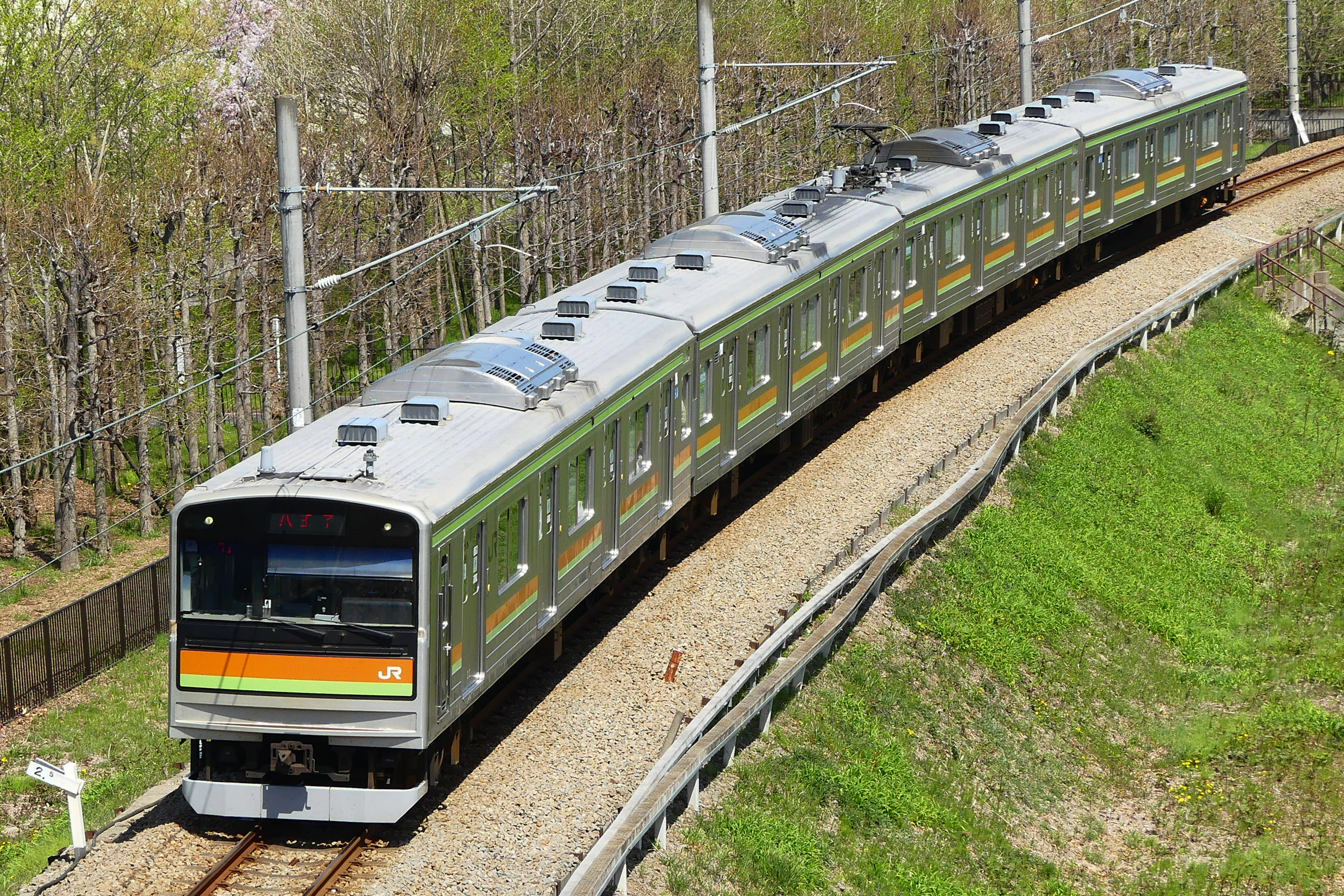
A 205-3000 series EMU in April 2017

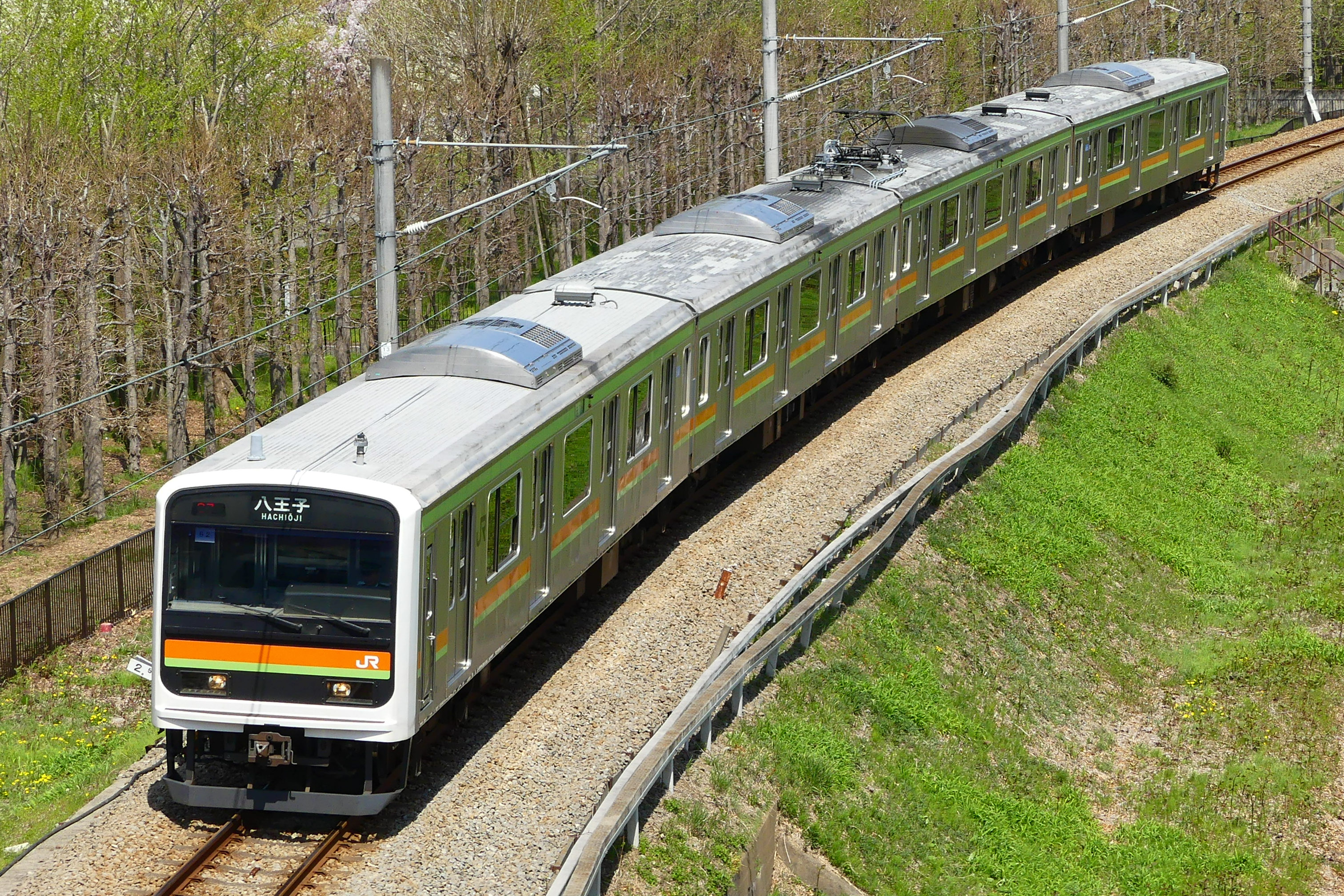
A 209-3000 series EMU in April 2017

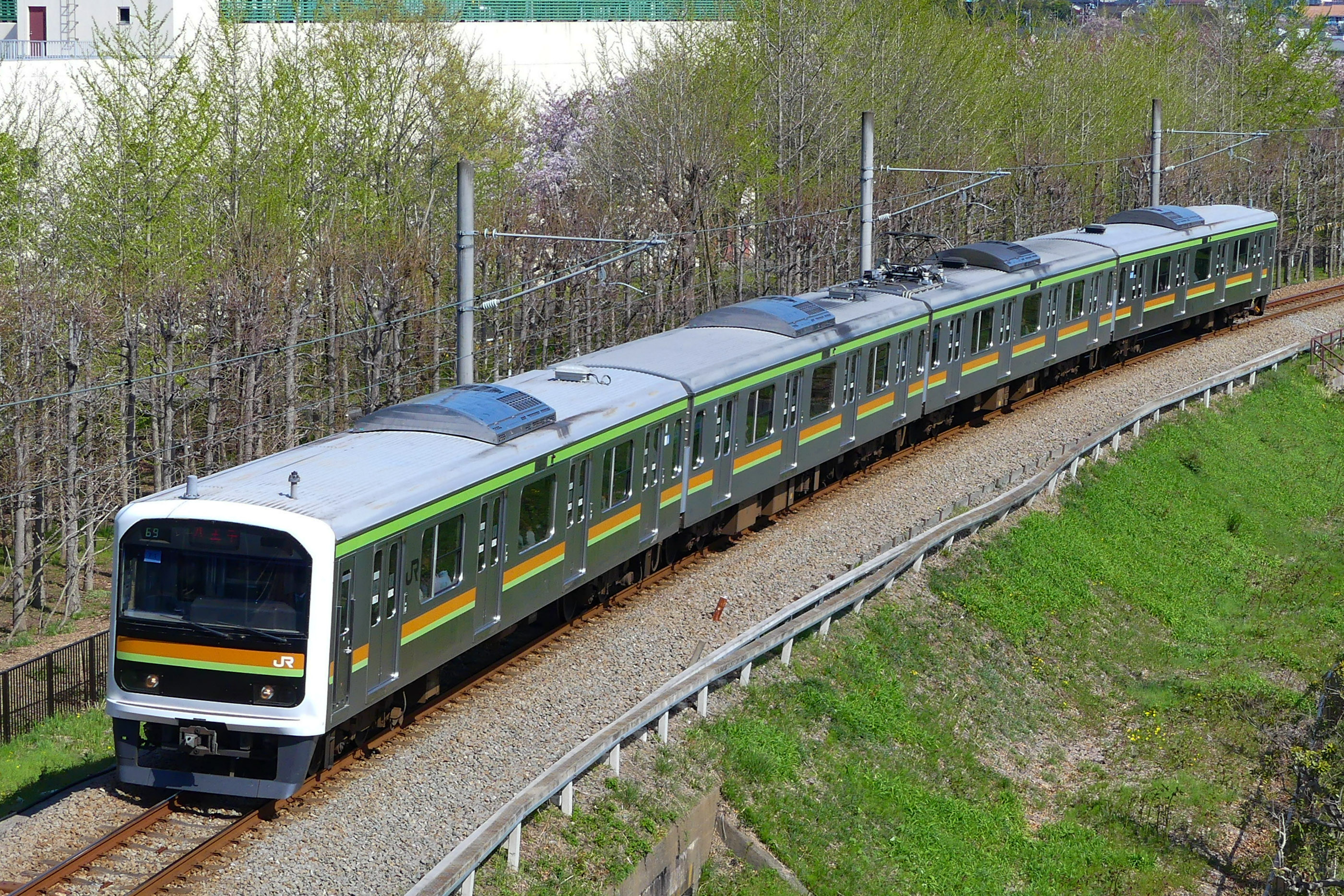
A 209-3100 series EMU in April 2017

== History ==
=== Line opening ===
A line linking Ōmiya with Kawagoe and continuing to the Hachikō Line at Komagawa was first proposed in March 1920. Construction work started in September 1935, with the line opening on 22 July 1940.

=== Switch to diesel ===
Services were initially steam hauled, but diesel multiple unit trains were introduced from 1 June 1950. The final steam-hauled passenger train ran on 30 September 1969.

=== Electrification ===
The line was electrified (1,500 V DC) from 30 September 1985, and through running commenced to and from the Saikyō Line, which opened at the same time. The tracks were doubled between Ōmiya to Nisshin, and a new EMU depot was opened close to Minami-Furuya Station. A special "Kawagoe Line Diesel Sayonara" train ran on the line on 3 November 1985.

=== Hachikō Line through services ===
Through services between Kawagoe and Hachiōji on the Hachikō Line began on 16 March 1996 following the electrification of the southern section of the Hachikō Line between Komagawa and Hachiōji.
