= Sashiōgi Station =

Railway station in Saitama, Japan

Sashiōgi Station 指扇駅
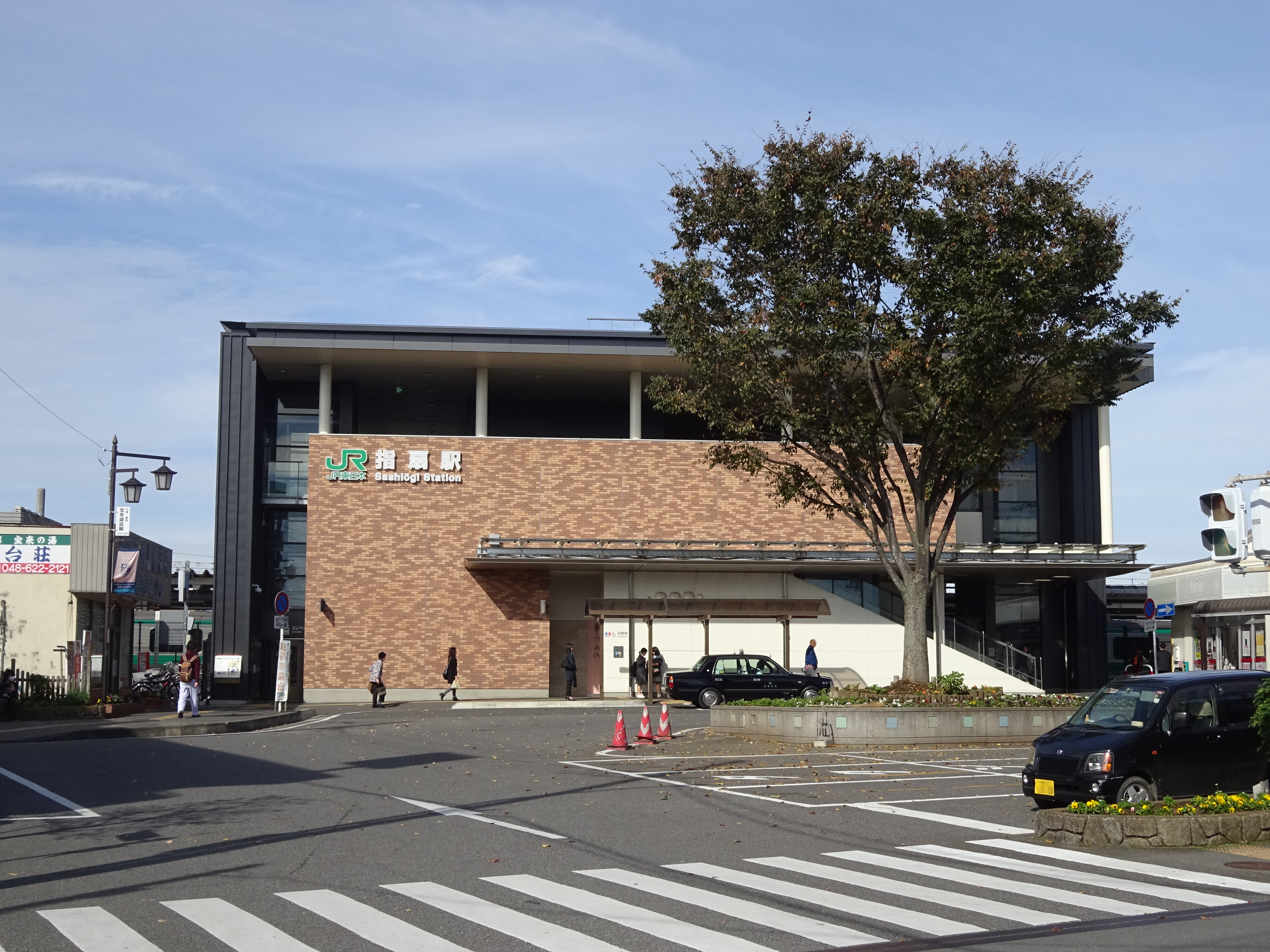
- Sashiōgi Station south entrance in November 2015

General information
- Location: 1716 Hōrai, Nishi-ku, Saitama-shi, Saitama-ken 331-0074; Japan
- Coordinates: 35°55′1.2504″N 139°33′54.3636″E
- Operator: JR East
- Line: ■ Kawagoe Line
- Distance: 7.7 km from Ōmiya
- Platforms: 2 side platforms
- Tracks: 2
- Connections: Bus stop

Other information
- Website: Official website

History
- Opened: 22 July 1940
- Rebuilt: 2014
- Electrified: 30 September 1985

Passengers
- FY2019: 10,761 (daily, boarding only)

Services
Preceding station	JR East	Following station
Minami-Furuya towards Kawagoe	Kawagoe Line Commuter Rapid Rapid Local	Nishi-Ōmiya towards Ōmiya
Location
- Location within Saitama city Location within Saitama Prefecture Location within Japan

Sashiōgi Station (指扇駅, Sashiōgi-eki) is a passenger railway station on the Kawagoe Line in located in Nishi-ku, Saitama, Saitama Prefecture, Japan, operated by East Japan Railway Company (JR East).

== Lines ==
Sashiōgi Station is served by the Kawagoe Line between Kawagoe and Ōmiya, and is located 7.7 km from Ōmiya. Most trains continue beyond Ōmiya on the Saikyō Line to Shinjuku and Shin-Kiba. Services operate every 20 minutes during the daytime.

== Station layout ==
The station has two side platforms serving two tracks. The station entrance was previously located on the south side only, with the platforms connected by a footbridge, but a new north entrance was added in March 2014 as part of a scheme to completely rebuild the station with the ticket barriers located on the second floor, above the platforms, and allowing free passage between the north and south sides of the tracks. The station is staffed.

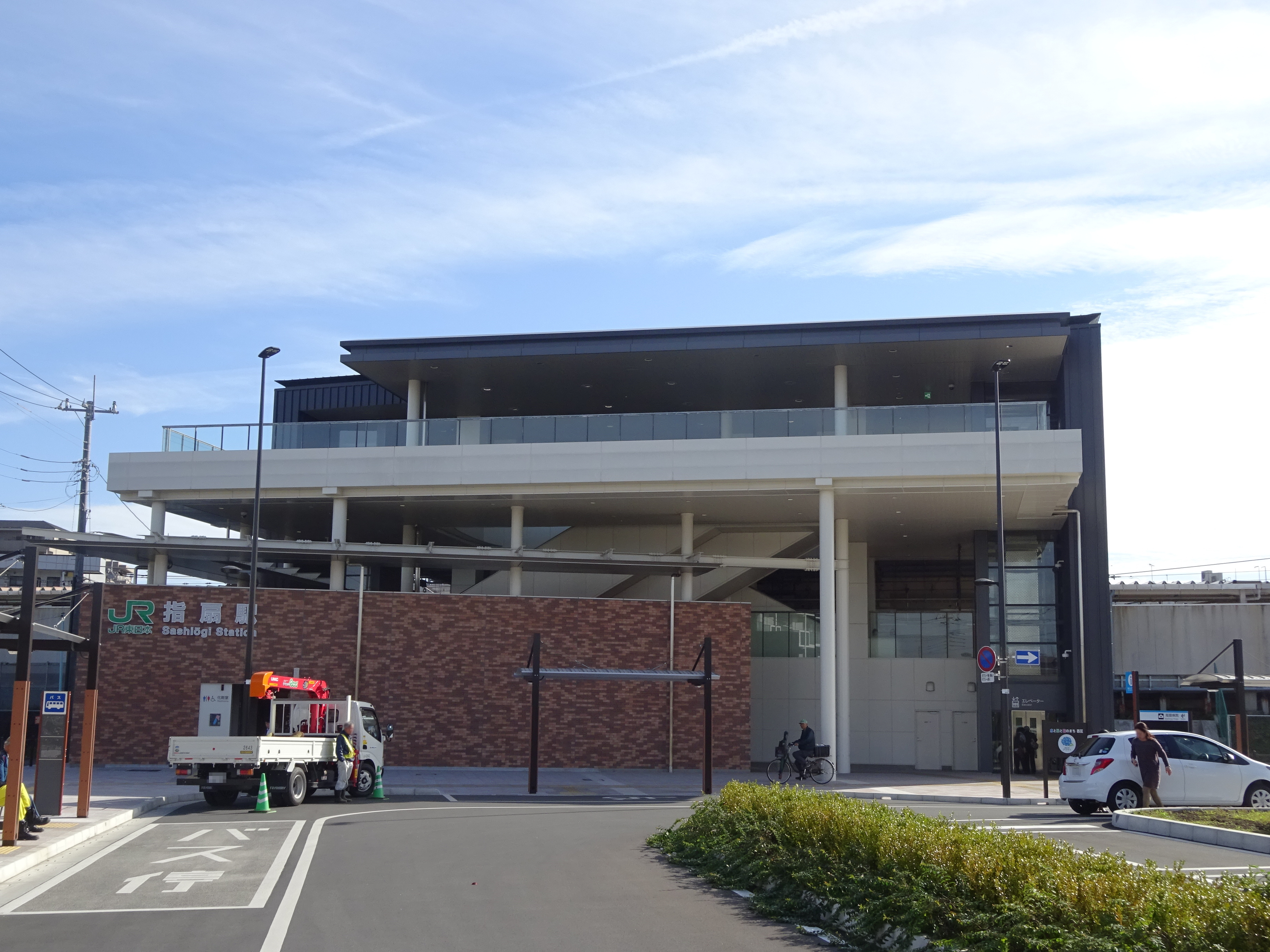
The north entrance in November 2015

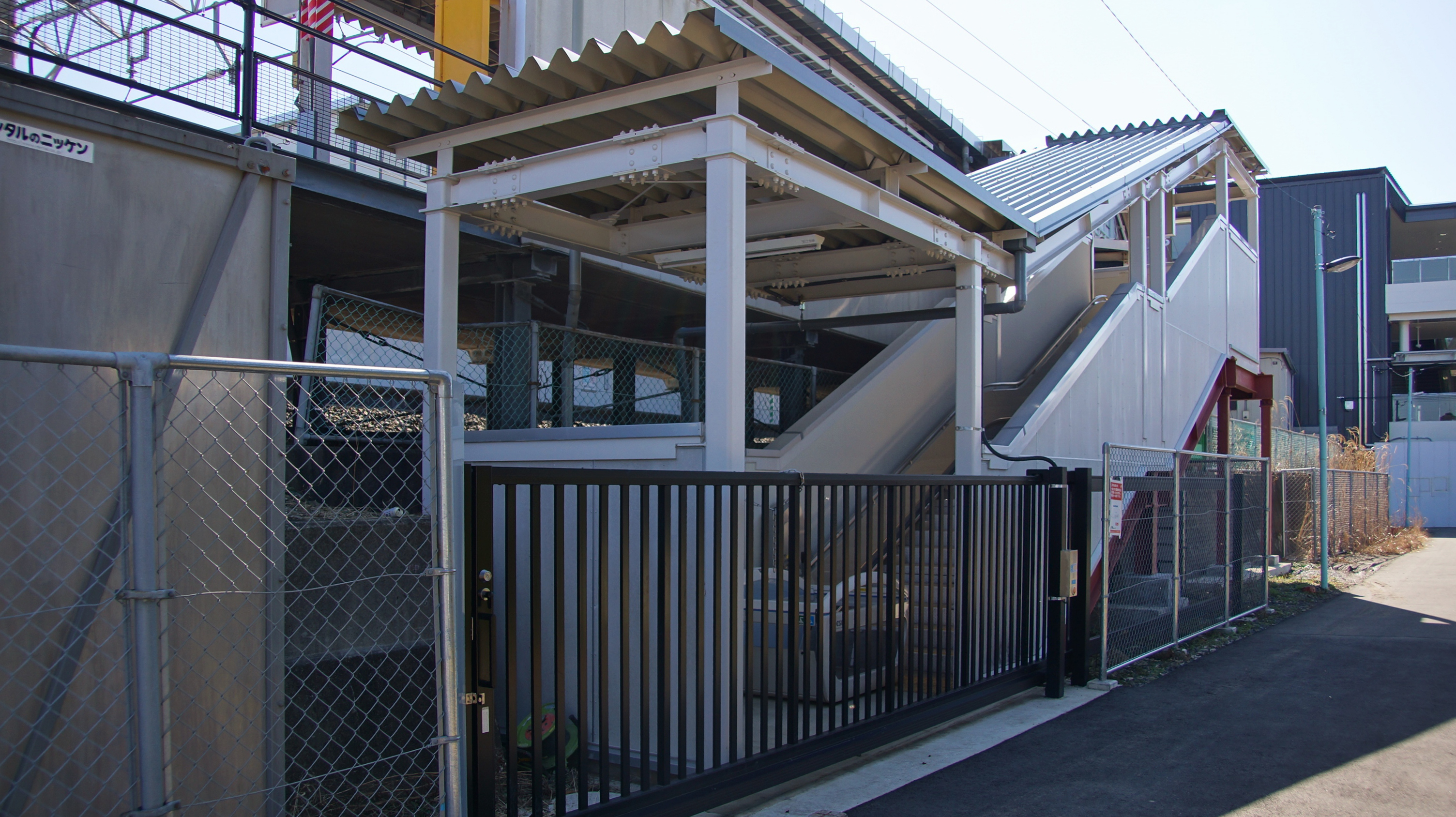
Temporary wheelchair access entrance on the north side during rebuilding in March 2014

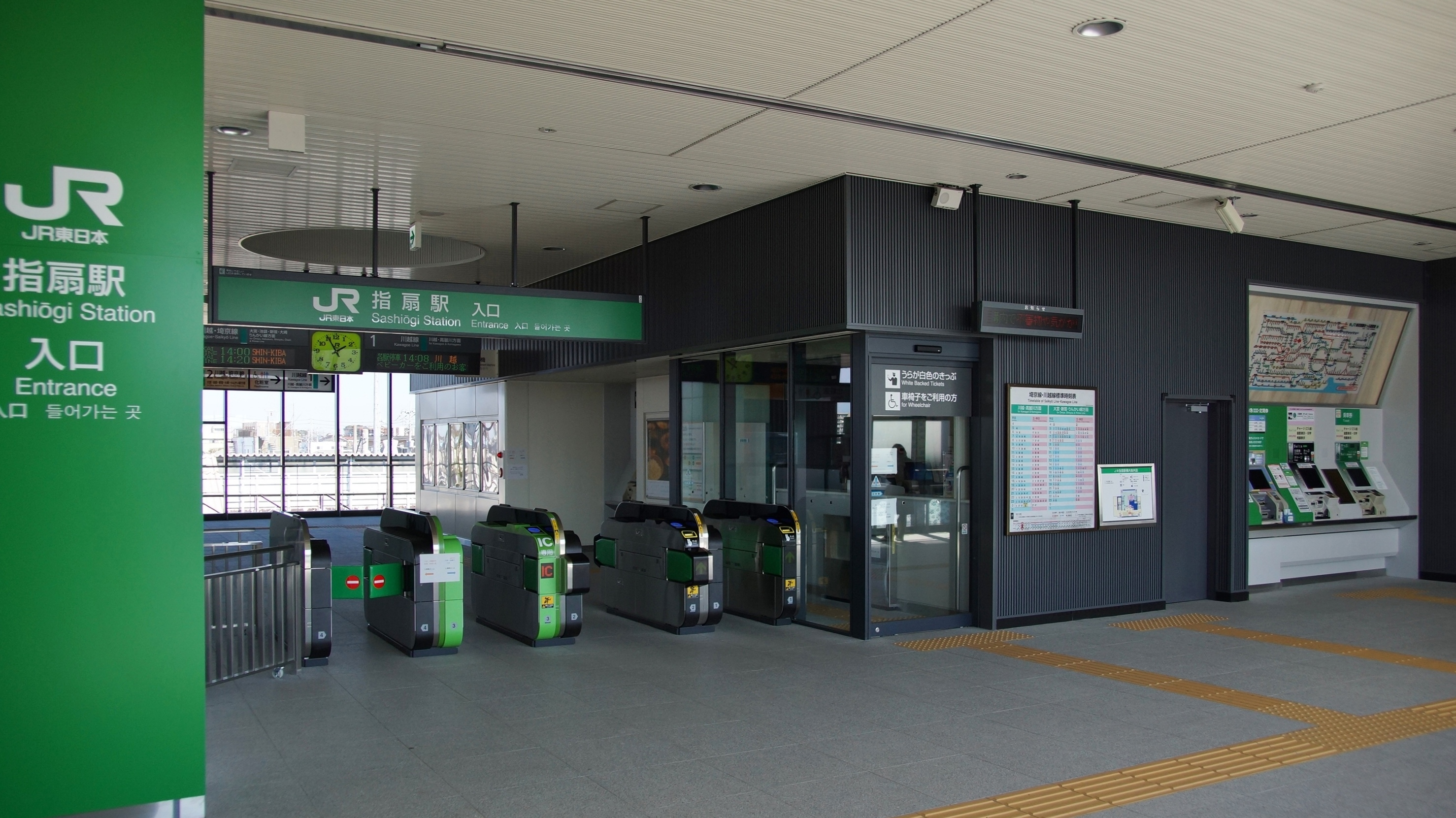
The ticket vending machines and ticket barriers in March 2014

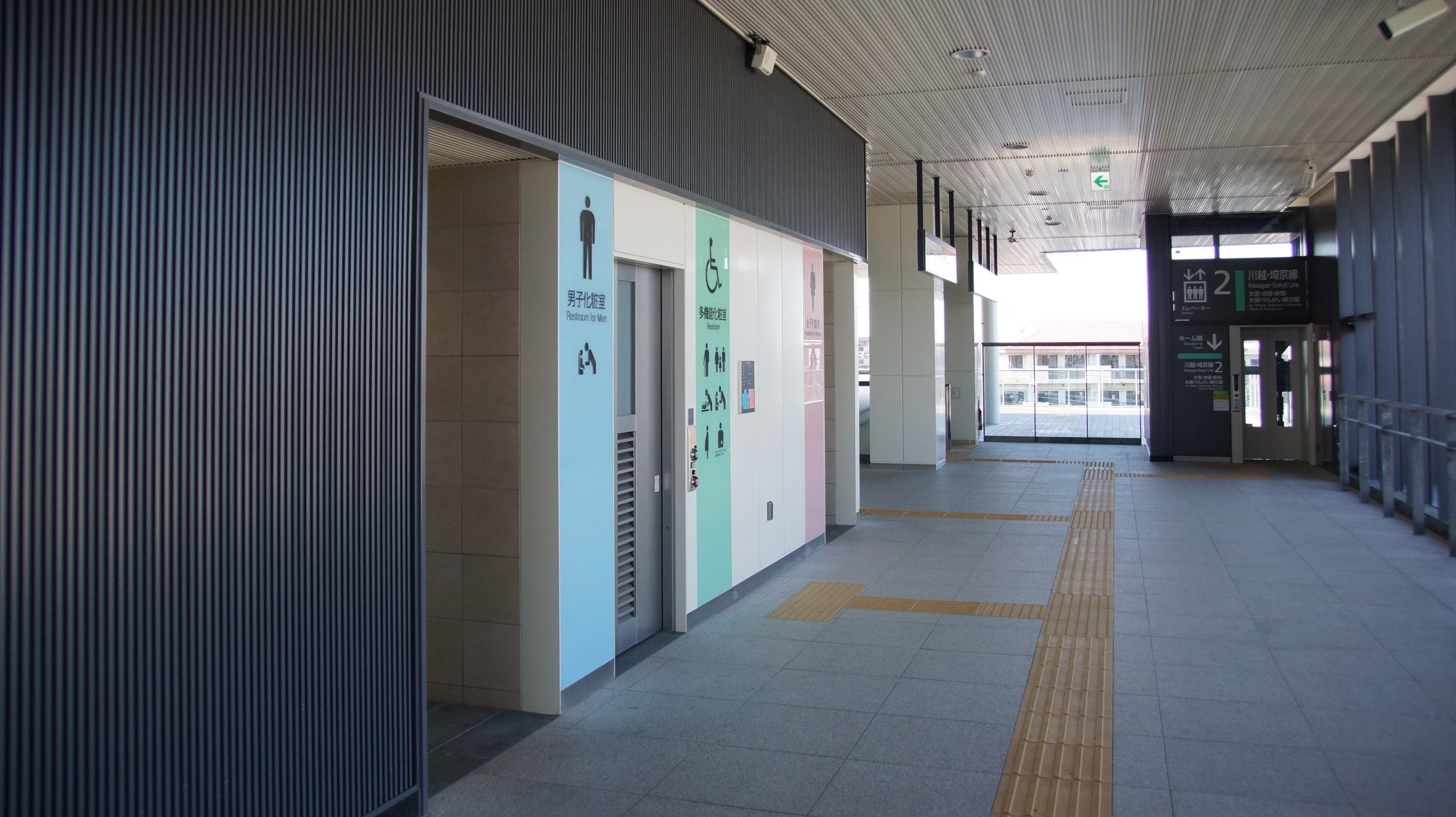
Toilets inside the station in March 2014

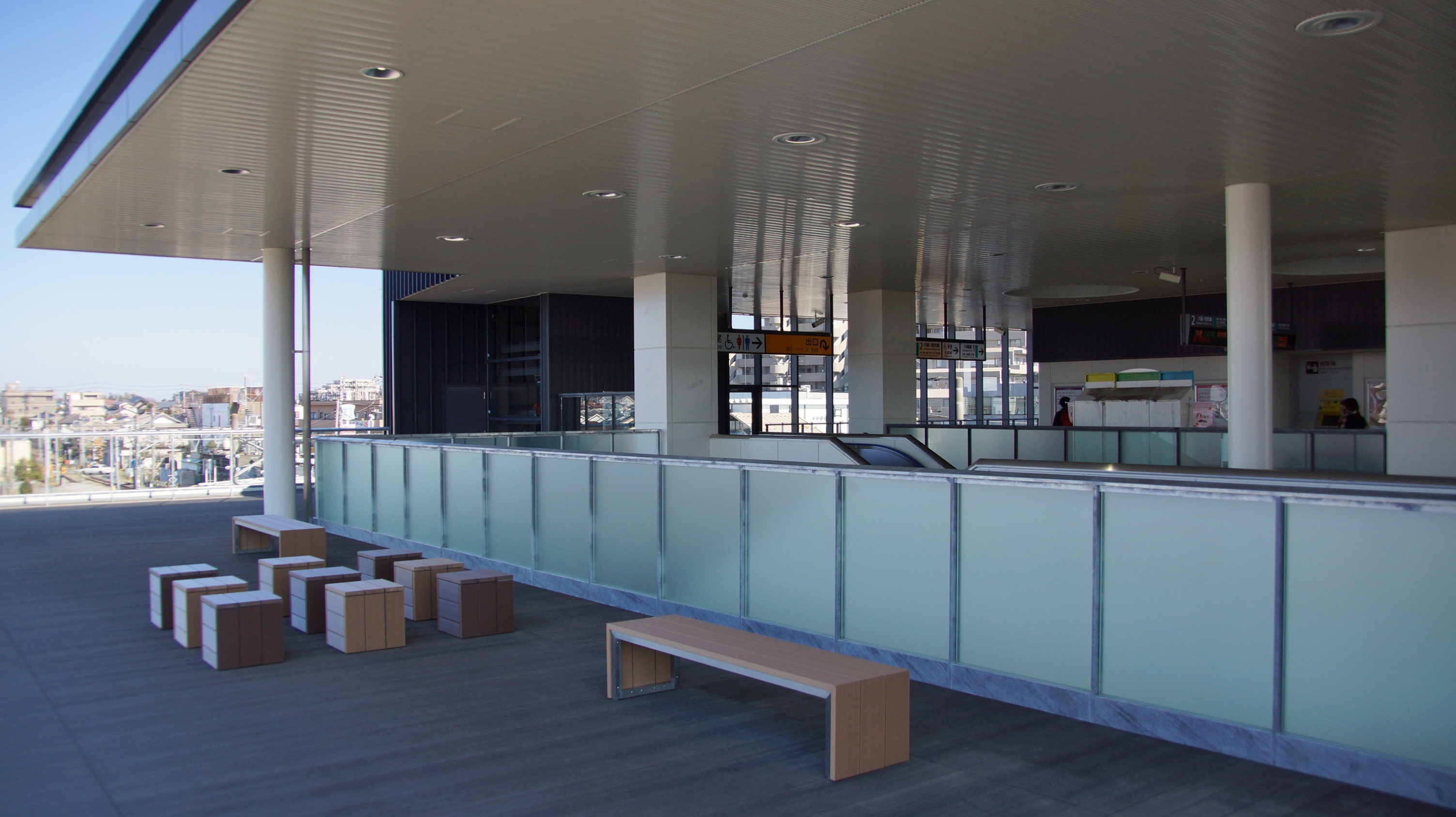
The north terrace in March 2014

=== Platforms ===
1	■ Kawagoe Line	for Minami-Furuya and Kawagoe
2	■ Kawagoe Line	for Ōmiya, Ikebukuro, and Shinjuku; Rinkai Line through service to Shin-Kiba

Passengers wishing to travel onward to Komagawa and Hachiōji need to change at Kawagoe, as there are no through trains running between Ōmiya and Komagawa.

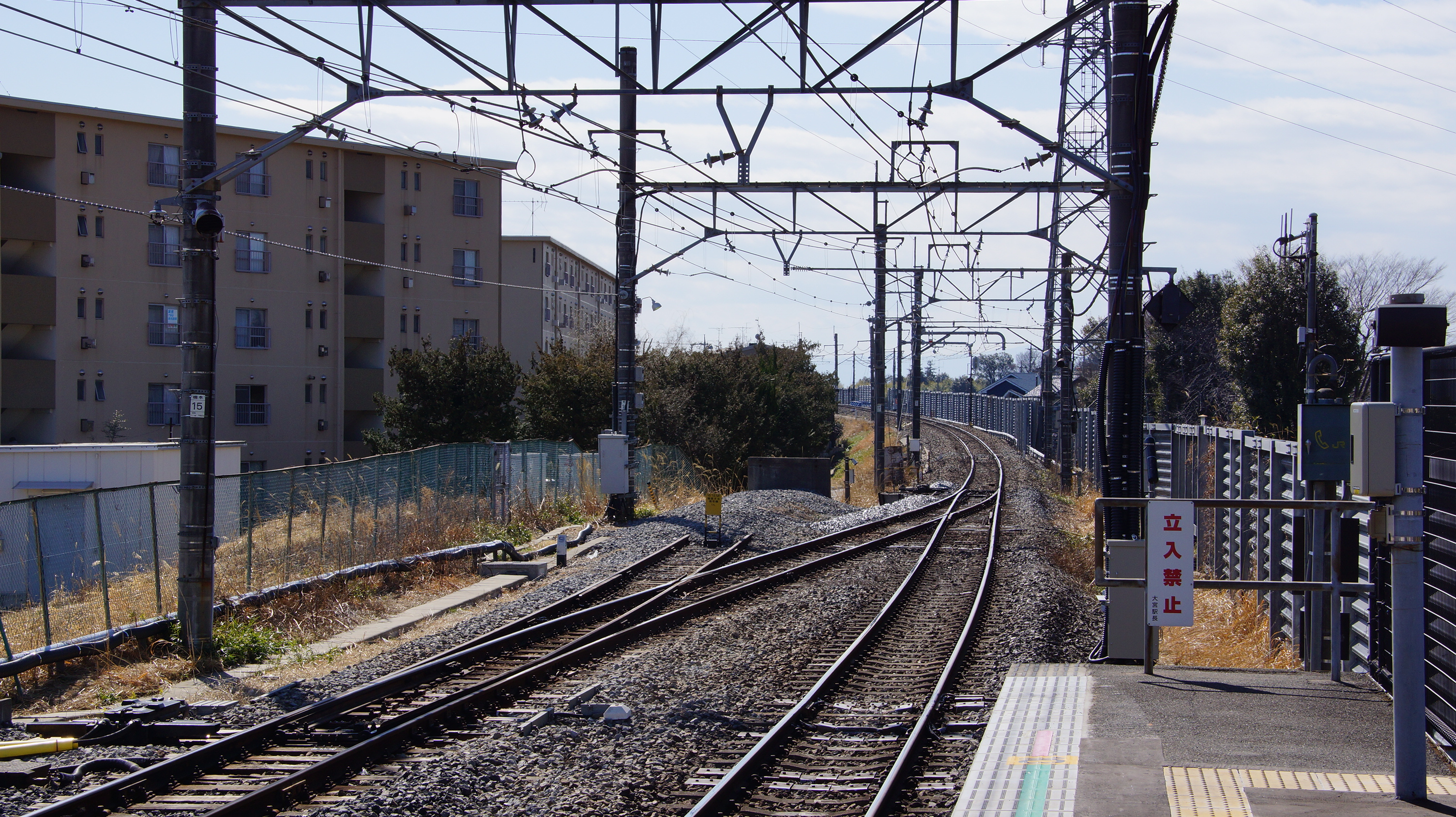
View from the west (Kawagoe) end of platform 2 looking west, March 2014

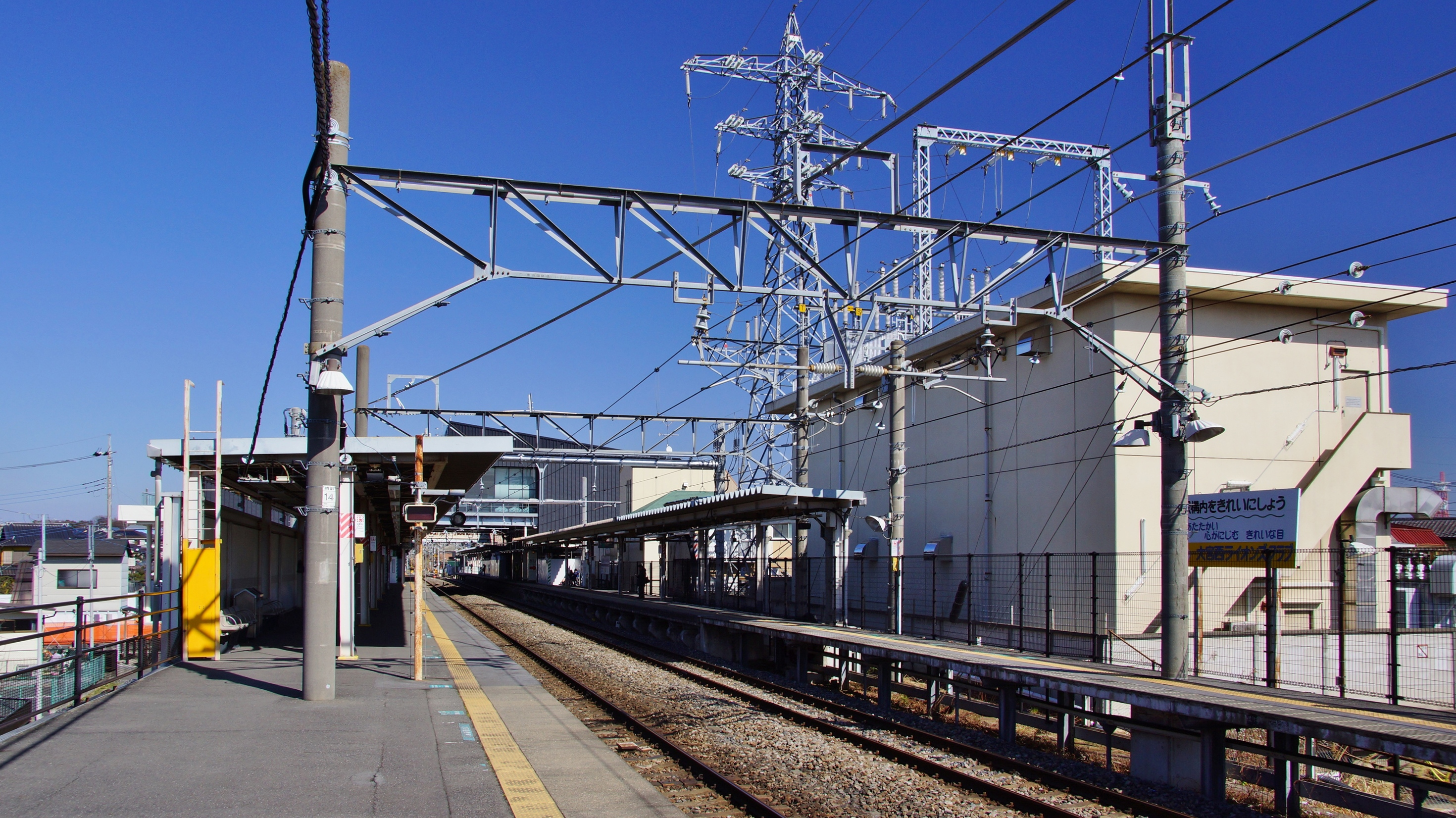
View from the west (Kawagoe) end of platform 2 looking east, March 2014

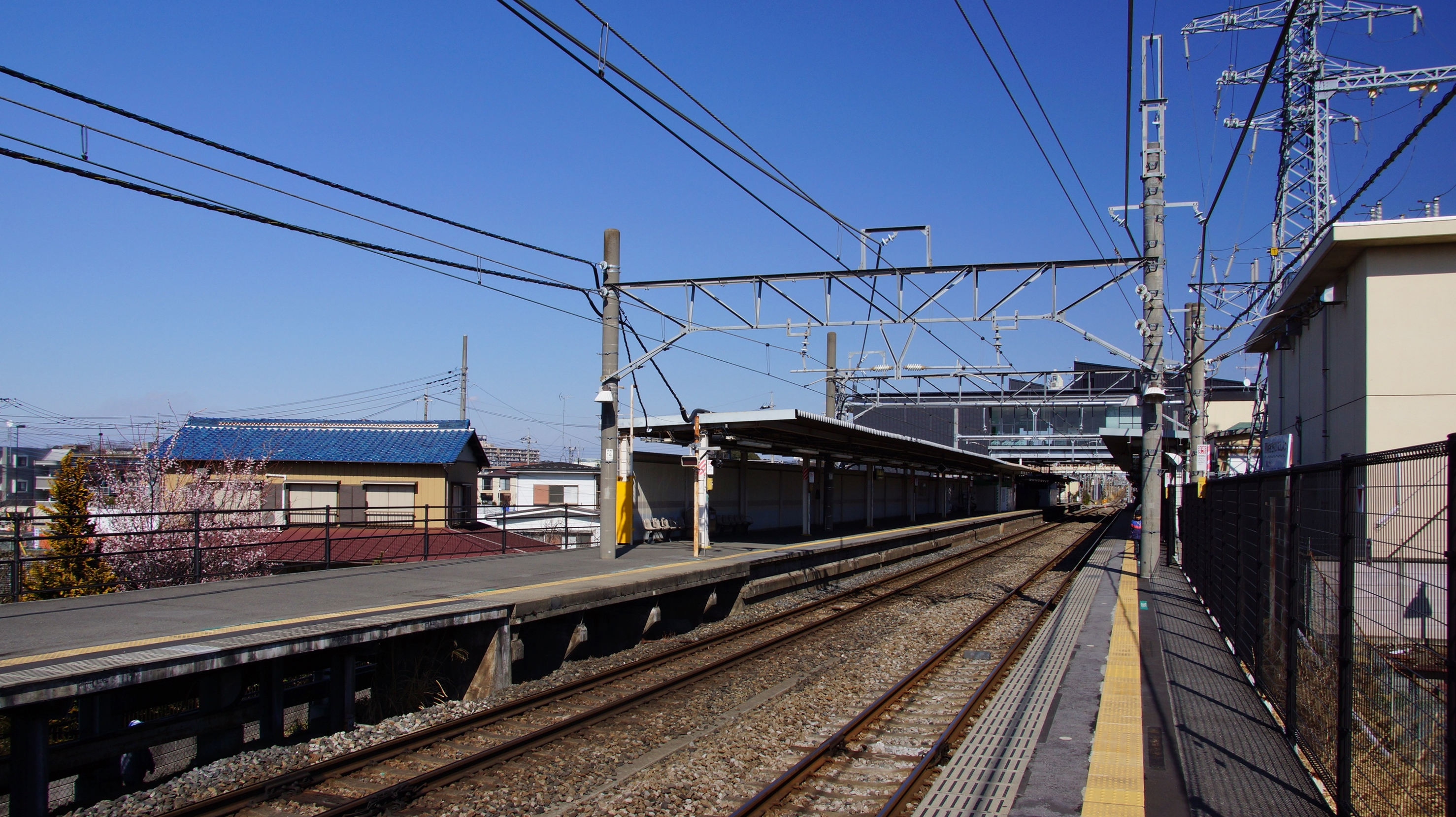
View from the west (Kawagoe) end of platform 1 looking east, March 2014

== History ==
The station opened on 22 July 1940 in what was then the village of Sashiōgi in Kita-Adachi District, Saitama. The line was electrified on 30 September 1985, from which date through-running began to and from the Saikyo Line. With the privatization of Japanese National Railways (JNR) on 1 April 1987, the station came under the control of JR East.

Work to rebuild the station started in 2012, and the new north entrance to the station was opened on 9 March 2014. Station rebuilding was completed during fiscal 2014, including a new station forecourt on the north side.

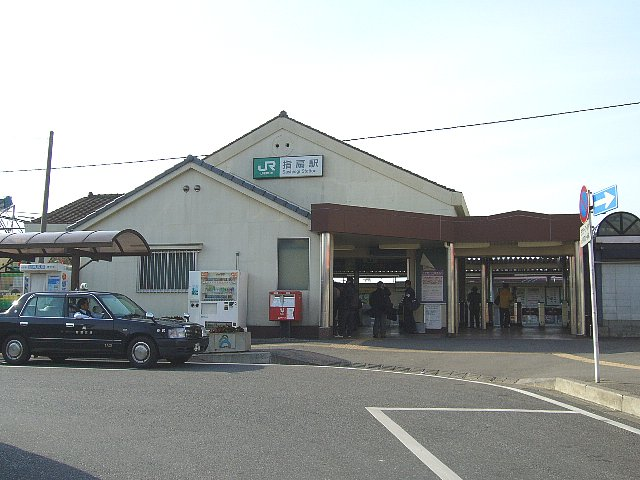
The station building and entrance in 2006 before rebuilding

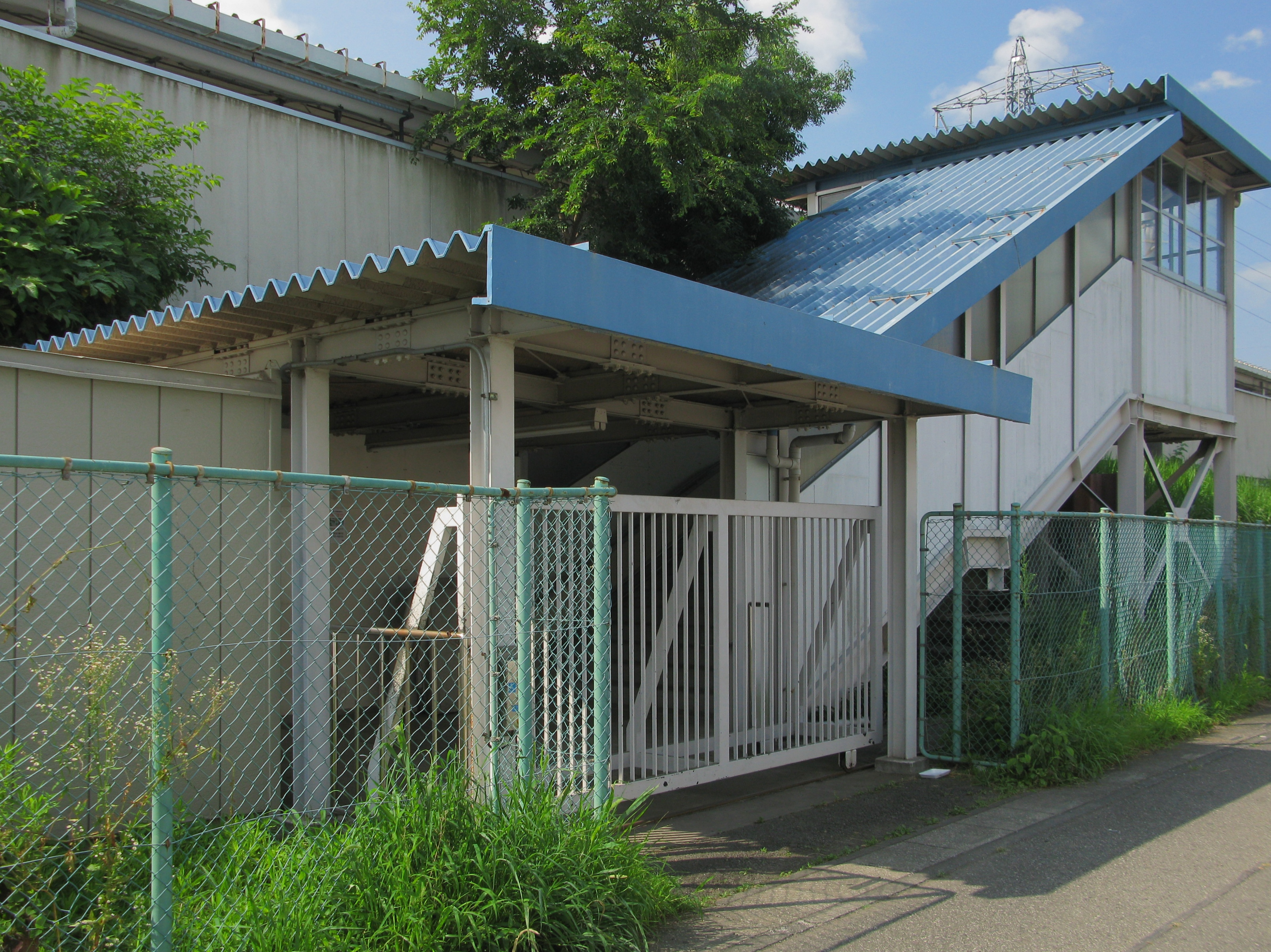
Extra north entrance in July 2012

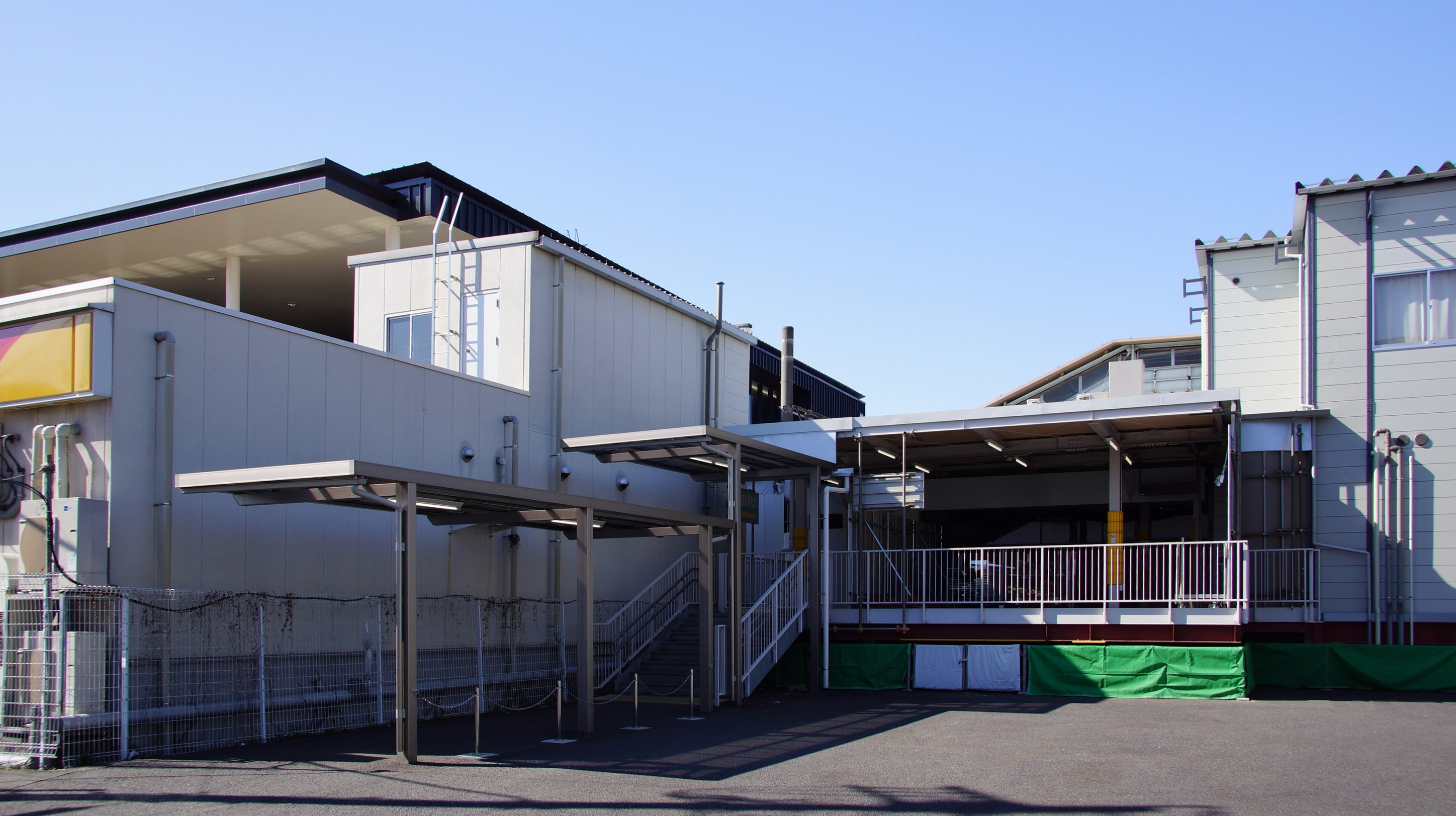
Temporary structure during rebuilding work on the south side in March 2014

== Passenger statistics ==
In fiscal 2019, the station was used by an average of 10,761 passengers daily (boarding passengers only). The passenger figures for previous years are as shown below.

Fiscal year	Daily average
2000	15,393
2005	14,856
2010	11,703
2015	11,108

== Surrounding area ==
=== North ===
- Sashiogi Hospital
- Shumei Eiko High School
- Ageo Tachibana High School
- Akiha Shrine
- National Route 16

=== South ===
- Mamiya Library
- Omiya Musashino High School
- Nishiasuma Park
- Tsuchiya Junior High School, Saitama City
- Musashino Bank, Sashiogi Branch
- Saitama Branch, Hanno Shinkin Bank

== See also ==
- List of railway stations in Japan
