= Minami-Furuya Station =

Railway station in Kawagoe, Saitama Prefecture, Japan

Minami-Furuya Station 南古谷駅
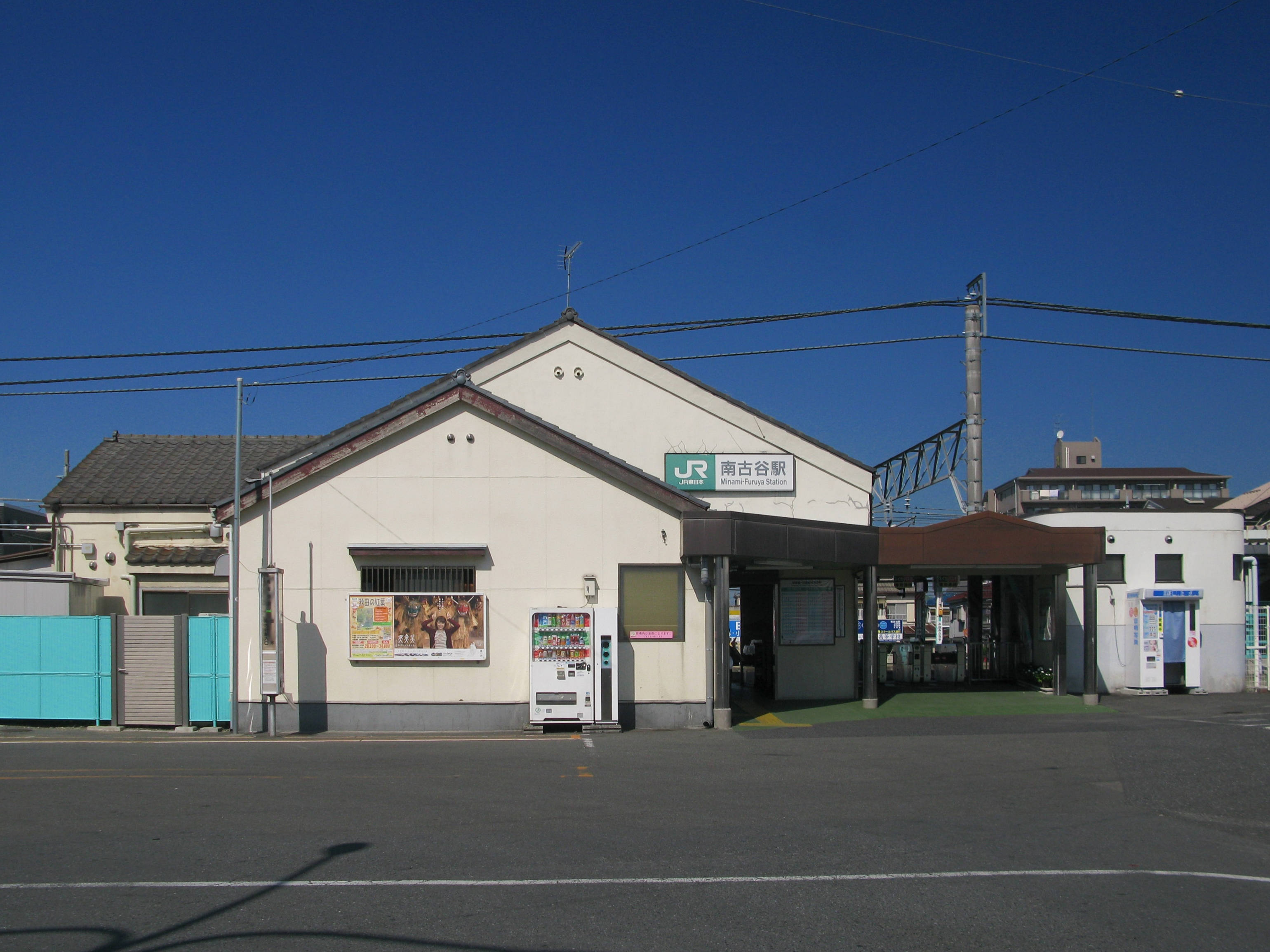
- Minami-Furuya Station in October 2012

General information
- Location: 252 Namiki, Kawagoe-shi, Saitama-ken 350–0023; Japan
- Coordinates: 35°54′11.6352″N 139°31′9.88″E
- Operator: JR East
- Line: ■ Kawagoe Line
- Distance: 12.4 km from Ōmiya
- Platforms: 1 side + 1 island platform
- Tracks: 3
- Connections: Bus stop

Other information
- Website: Official website

History
- Opened: 22 July 1940
- Rebuilt: 2010–2011
- Electrified: 30 September 1985

Passengers
- FY2019: 8474 (daily, boarding only)

Services
Preceding station	JR East	Following station
Kawagoe Terminus	Kawagoe Line Commuter Rapid Rapid Local	Sashiōgi towards Ōmiya
Location
- Location within Saitama Prefecture Location within Japan

Minami-Furuya Station (南古谷駅, Minami-Furuya-eki) is a passenger railway station on the Kawagoe Line located in the city of Kawagoe, Saitama, Japan, operated by the East Japan Railway Company (JR East).

== Lines ==
Minami-Furuya Station is served by the Kawagoe Line between Kawagoe and Ōmiya, and is located 12.4 km from Ōmiya. The majority of services continue beyond Ōmiya on the Saikyo Line to Shinjuku and Shin-Kiba. In the morning peak, some eastbound trains towards Tokyo and some westbound trains toward Komagawa and Hachiōji start from this station, as it is located close to Kawagoe Depot. Services operate every 20 minutes during the daytime.

== Station layout ==
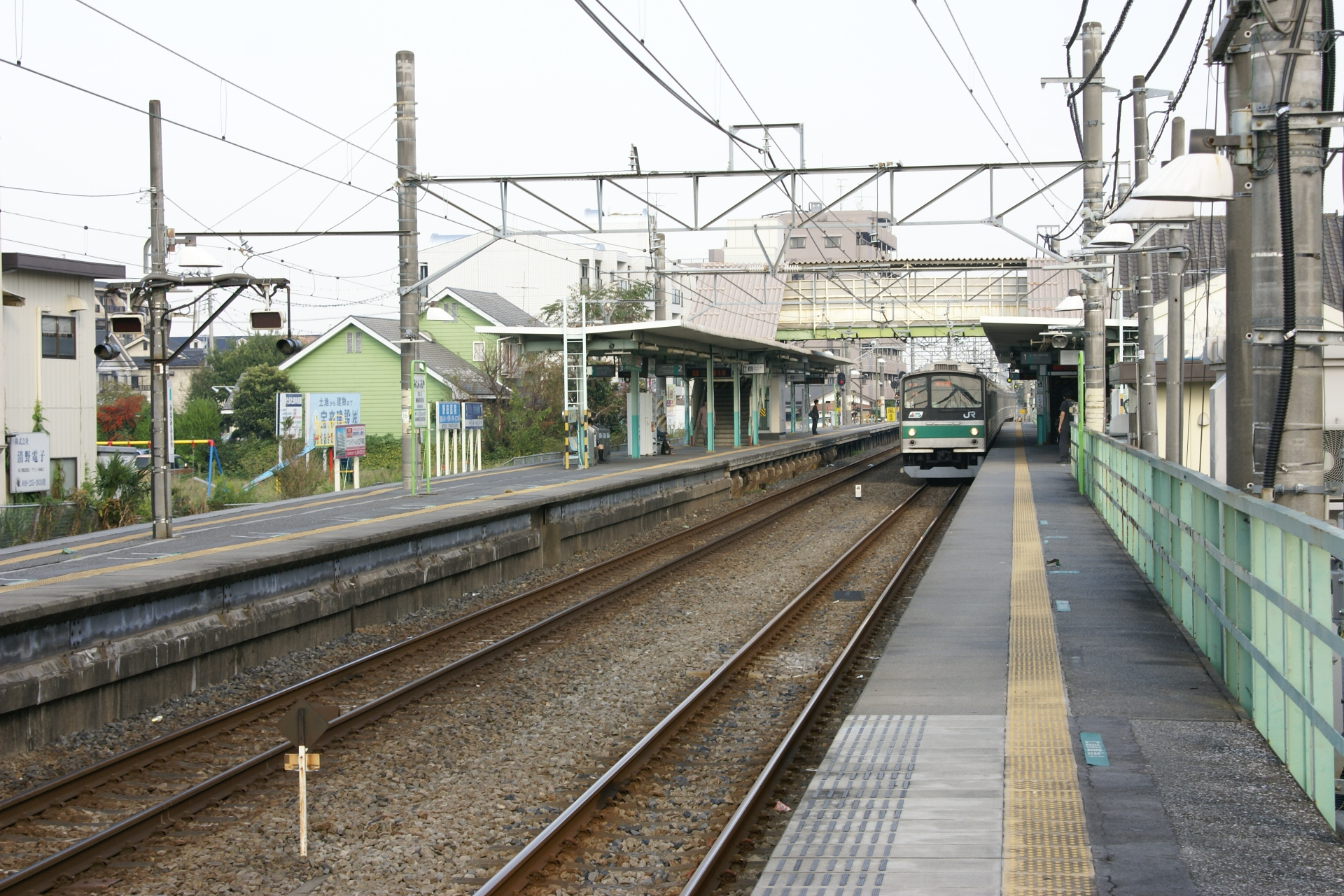
View of the station looking east from platform 1 in October 2008

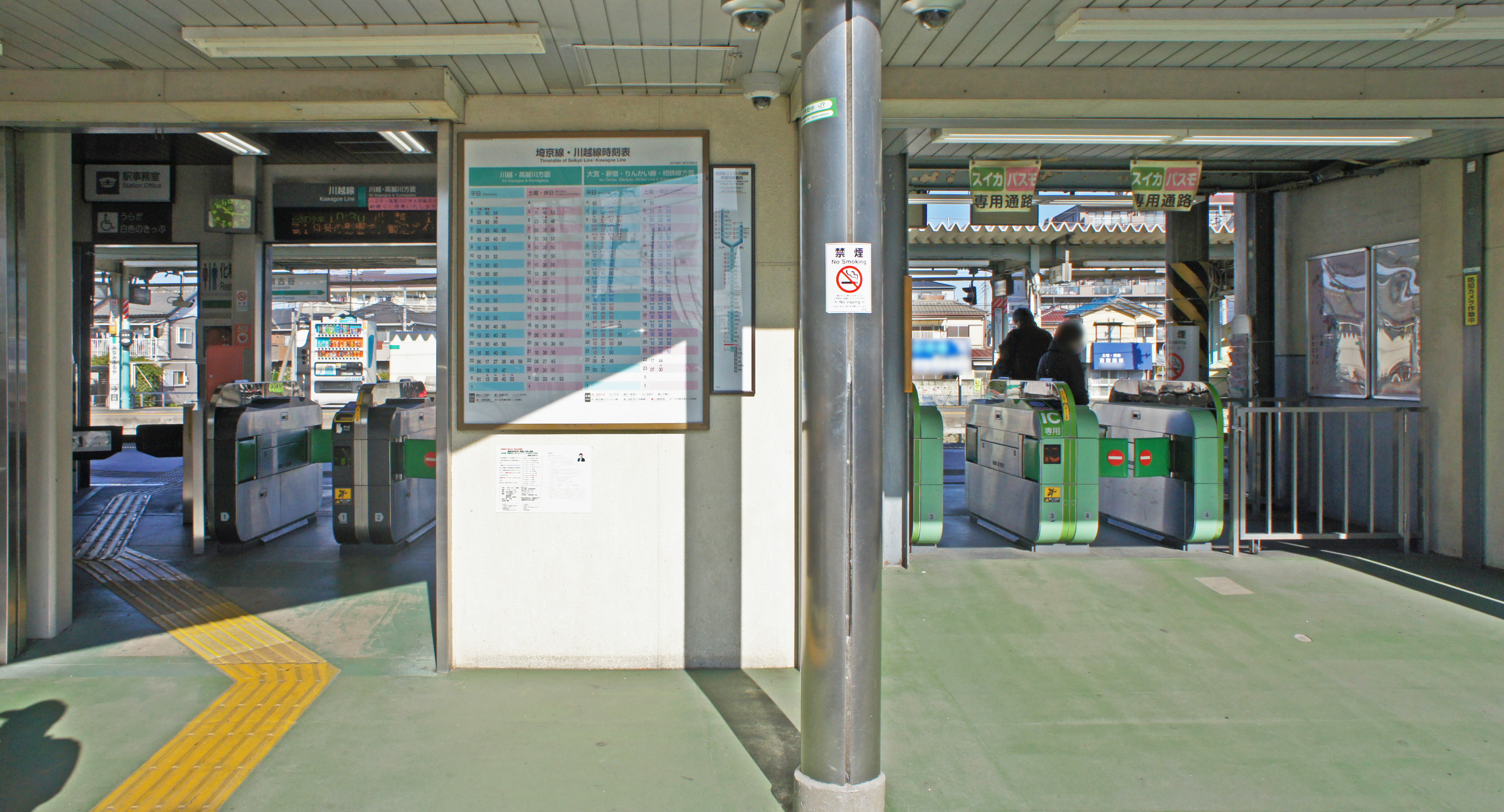
Ticket barriers in November 2019

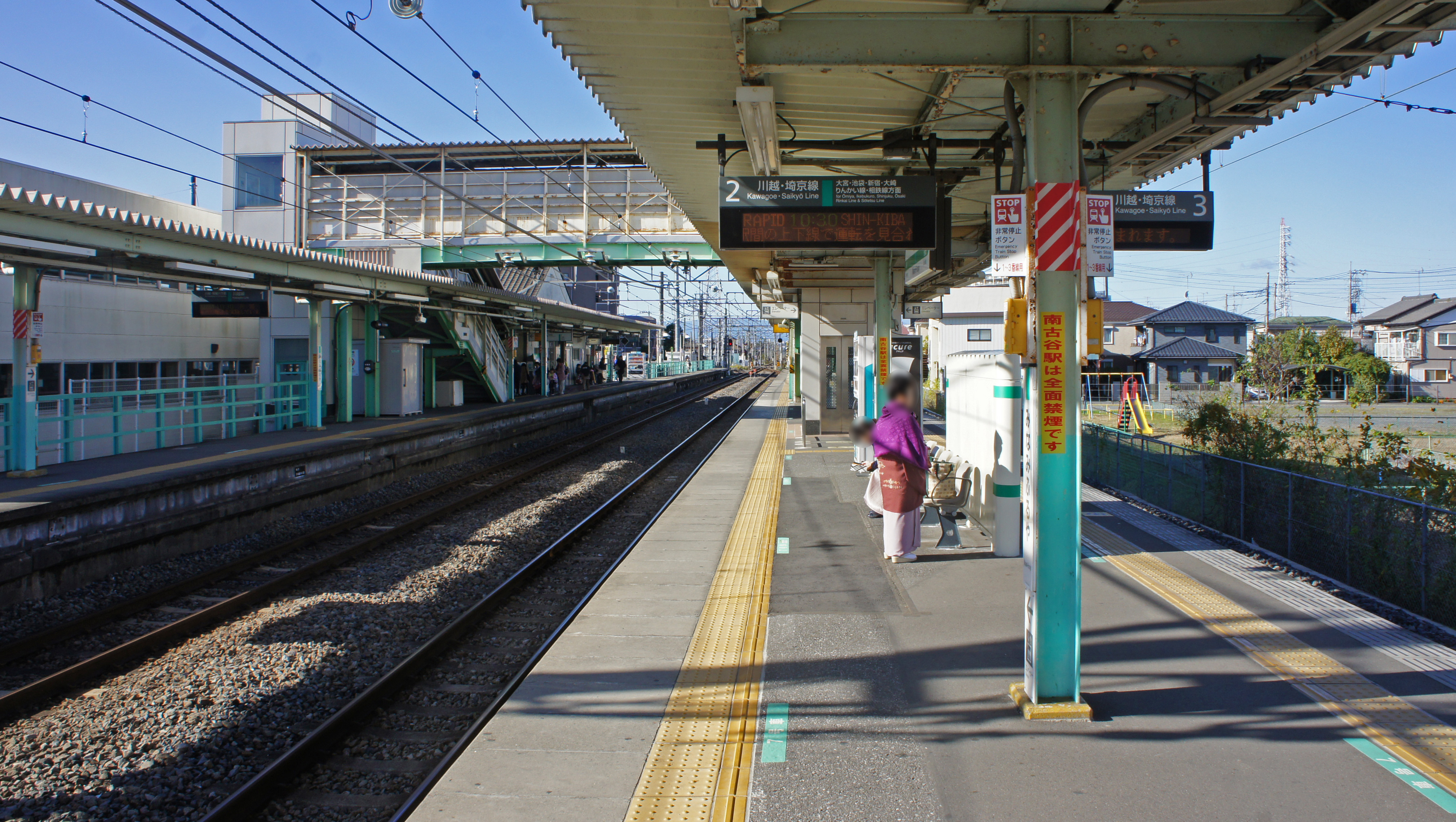
View of the station looking west from platform 2 and 3 in November 2019

The station consists of one side platform and one island platform serving three tracks, connected to the station building by a footbridge. The station building and entrance is located on the south side of the tracks. The station is staffed.

=== Platforms ===
1	■ Kawagoe Line	for Kawagoe, Komagawa, and Hachiko Line through service to Hachiōji
2/3	■ Kawagoe Line	for Ōmiya, Ikebukuro, and Shinjuku, Rinkai Line through service to Shin-Kiba

== History ==
Minami-Furuya Station opened on 22 July 1940. The line was electrified on 30 September 1985, from which date through-running began to and from the Saikyo Line. With the privatization of Japanese National Railways (JNR) on 1 April 1987, the station came under the control of JR East.

== Passenger statistics ==
In fiscal 2019, the station was used by an average of 8474 passengers daily (boarding passengers only). The passenger figures for previous years are as shown below.

Fiscal year	Daily average
2000	6,538
2005	7,437
2010	7,837
2015	8,163

== Surrounding area ==
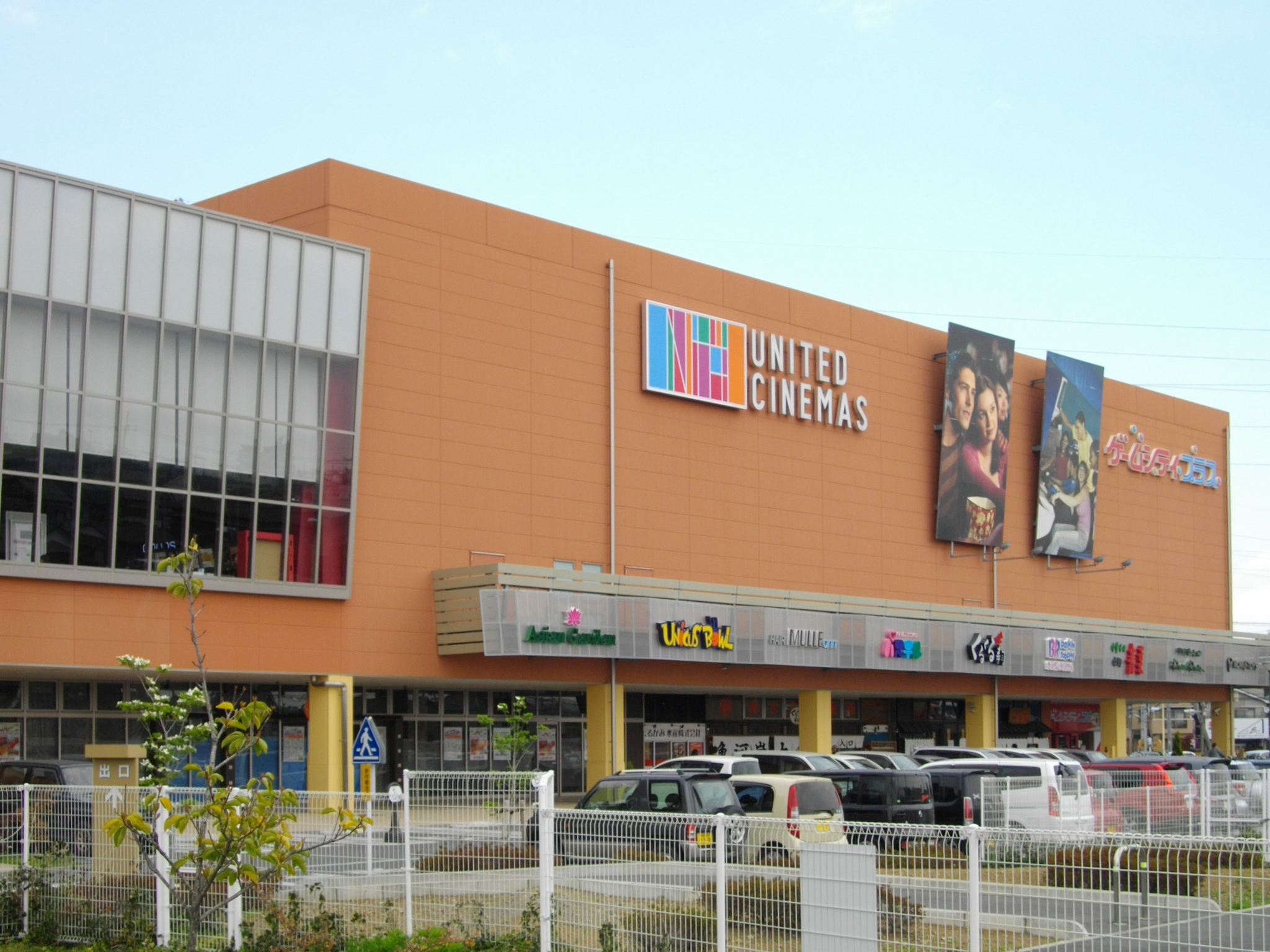
Unicus Minami-Furuya Shopping Centre in April 2011

- JR East Kawagoe Depot
- Toho College of Music
- Kawagoe Tax Office
- Unicus Minami-Furuya Shopping Centre

== See also ==
- List of railway stations in Japan
