= Kita (surname) =

Kita is a Japanese and Polish surname. As a Japanese surname it might be written various ways in kanji (e.g. 北 meaning "north"; 木田 meaning "field of trees"; 喜多 meaning "many happinesses"). As a Polish surname it is derived from the nickname "kita", which means "crest bunch sheaf; tail". Notable people with the surname include:

- Atsushi Kita (北 篤; born 1988), Japanese baseball outfielder
- Candace Kita (born 1967), American actress
- Hideki Kita (喜多 秀喜; born 1952), Japanese long-distance runner
- Ikki Kita (北 一輝; 1883–1937), Japanese philosopher
- Kazuma Kita (北 一真; born 1981), Japanese football goalkeeper
- Kensuke Kita (喜多 建介; born 1977), Japanese vocalist and guitarist
- Morio Kita (北 杜夫; 1927–2011), Japanese novelist
- Przemysław Kita (born 1993), Polish football striker
- Regina Wasilewska-Kita (born 1951), Polish politician
- Rentaro Kita (北 廉太郎; 1920–1940), Japanese ryūkōka singer
- Seiichi Kita (喜多 誠一; 1886–1947), lieutenant general in the Imperial Japanese Army
- Sumire Kita (喜田 純鈴; born 2001), Japanese gymnast
- Takuya Kita (北卓也; born 1972), Japanese basketball coach
- Toshiyuki Kita (喜多 俊之; born 1942), Japanese furniture designer
- Yasushi Kita (喜多 靖; born 1978), Japanese football defender
- Waldemar Kita (born 1953), Polish businessman

== Fictional characters ==
- Ikuyo Kita (喜多 郁代) , a fictional character from Bocchi the Rock!.
- Shinsuke Kita (北 信介) is the team captain of the Inarizaki High School Volleyball team in the sports anime Haikyuu!!
