= Kita =

Kita or KITA may refer to:

== People ==
- Kita (surname)
- Kita Alexander (born 1996), Australian singer-songwriter
- João Leithardt Neto, Brazilian footballer nicknamed Kita
- Sampsa Astala, Finnish musician whose stage name is Kita

== Places ==
=== In Japan ===
- Kita-ku (北区), meaning “northern ward”, is a ward name found in several cities:
  - Kita-ku, Hamamatsu
  - Kita-ku, Kobe
  - Kita-ku, Kumamoto
  - Kita-ku, Kyoto
  - Kita-ku, Nagoya
  - Kita-ku, Niigata
  - Kita-ku, Okayama
  - Kita-ku, Osaka
  - Kita-ku, Saitama
  - Kita-ku, Sakai
  - Kita-ku, Sapporo
  - Kita-ku, Tokyo
- Kita, Hokkaidō (北村), a village in Hokkaidō
- A local term for the northern commercial district of Osaka (part of, but not the same as, Kita-ku)
- Kita District, Ehime (喜多郡)
- Kita District, Kagawa (木田郡)
- Kita Station (喜多駅), a railway station in Miyazu, Kyoto Prefecture
- Mount Kita (北岳), a mountain of the Akaishi Mountains in Yamanashi Prefecture

=== Elsewhere ===
- Kita, Mali, a town in Mali
- Kita, Łódź Voivodeship, central Poland
- One of the Maug Islands

== Other uses ==
- KITA (FM), an American radio station
- Kita (Noh school) (喜多), a school of Noh theatre
- Korea International Trade Association
- People's Welfare Party (Malaysia) (Malay: Parti Kesejahteraan Insan Tanah Air), a Malaysian political party
- Sony Ericsson Yari, known as Kita in the Philippines
- A common shorthand for Kindertagesstätte (kindergarten) in Germany (as Kita or KiTa)
