= Regina Wasilewska-Kita =

Polish politician (born 1951)

member of Sejm 2005-2007
- In office 25 September 2005 – 4 November 2007

Personal details
- Born: 27 February 1951 (age 75)
- Party: Samoobrona

Regina Wasilewska-Kita (born 27 February 1951) is a Polish politician. She was elected to Sejm on 25 September 2005, getting 6890 votes in 41 Szczecin district as a candidate from the Samoobrona Rzeczpospolitej Polskiej list.

== See also ==
- Members of Polish Sejm 2005-2007
