= Buk District =

- Hangul: 북구
- Hanja: 北區
- RR: Buk-gu
- MR: Puk-ku

Buk District (Korean: 북구), or "Northern District", is the name of a gu in several South Korean cities:

- Buk District, Busan
- Buk District, Daegu
- Buk District, Gwangju
- Buk District, Pohang
- Buk District, Ulsan

== See also ==
- Northern District (disambiguation)
