= Kita-ku, Saitama =

Kita-ku, Saitama 北区
- Ward
- Kita Ward
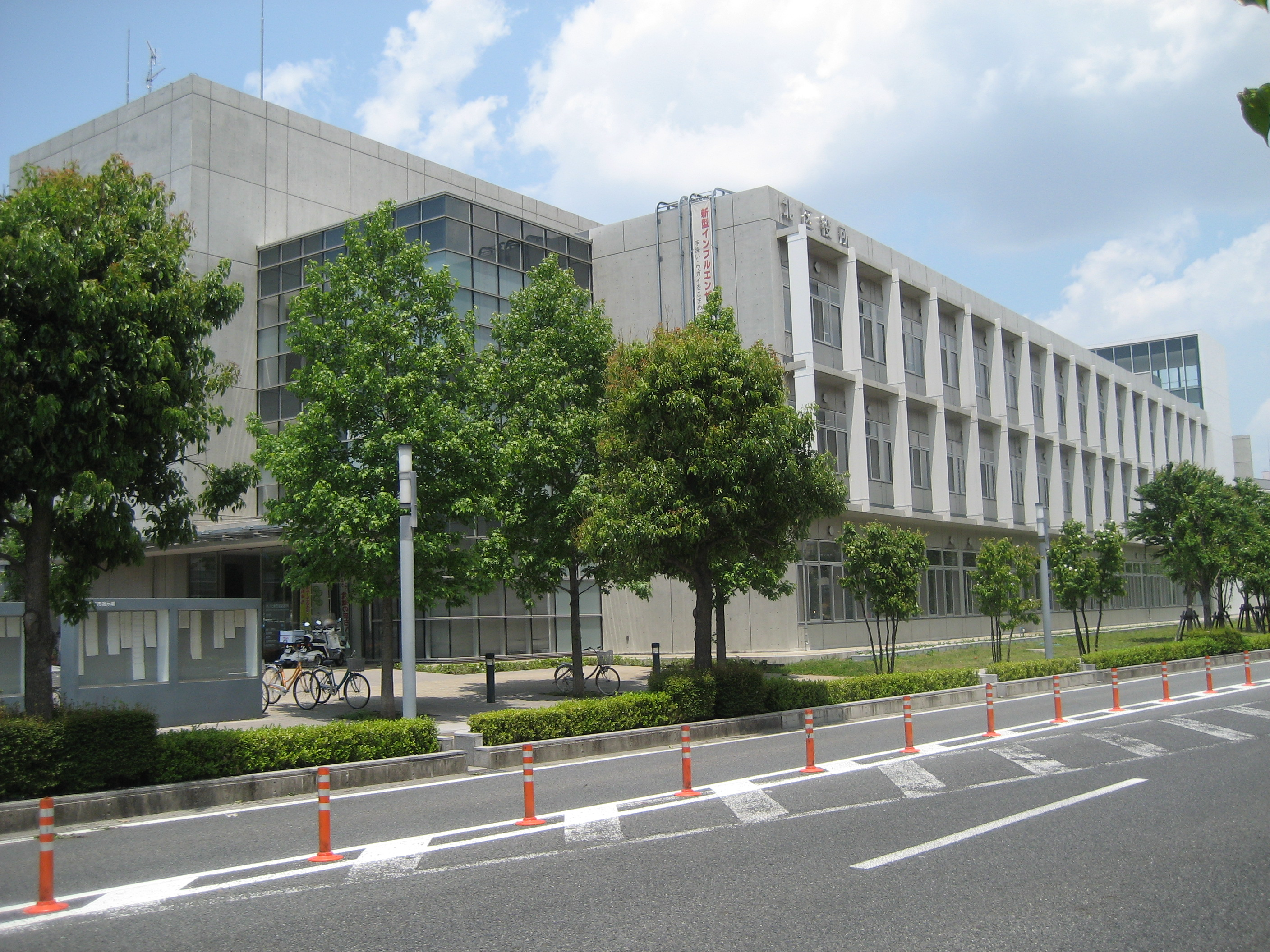
- Kita Ward Office, Saitama City

- Seal

- Location of Kita-ku in Saitama

- Coordinates: 35°55′53.2″N 139°35′12.9″E
- Country: Japan
- Region: Kantō
- Prefecture: Saitama
- City: Saitama

Area
  - Total: 16.86 km^{2} (6.51 sq mi)

Population (March 2021)
  - Total: 148,935
  - Density: 8,834/km^{2} (22,880/sq mi)
- Time zone: UTC+9 (Japan Standard Time)
- -Flower: Rapeseed
- Phone number: 048-835-3156
- Address: 1-852-1 Miyahara-cho, Kita-ku, Saitama-shi, Saitama-ken 331-8586
- Website: Official website

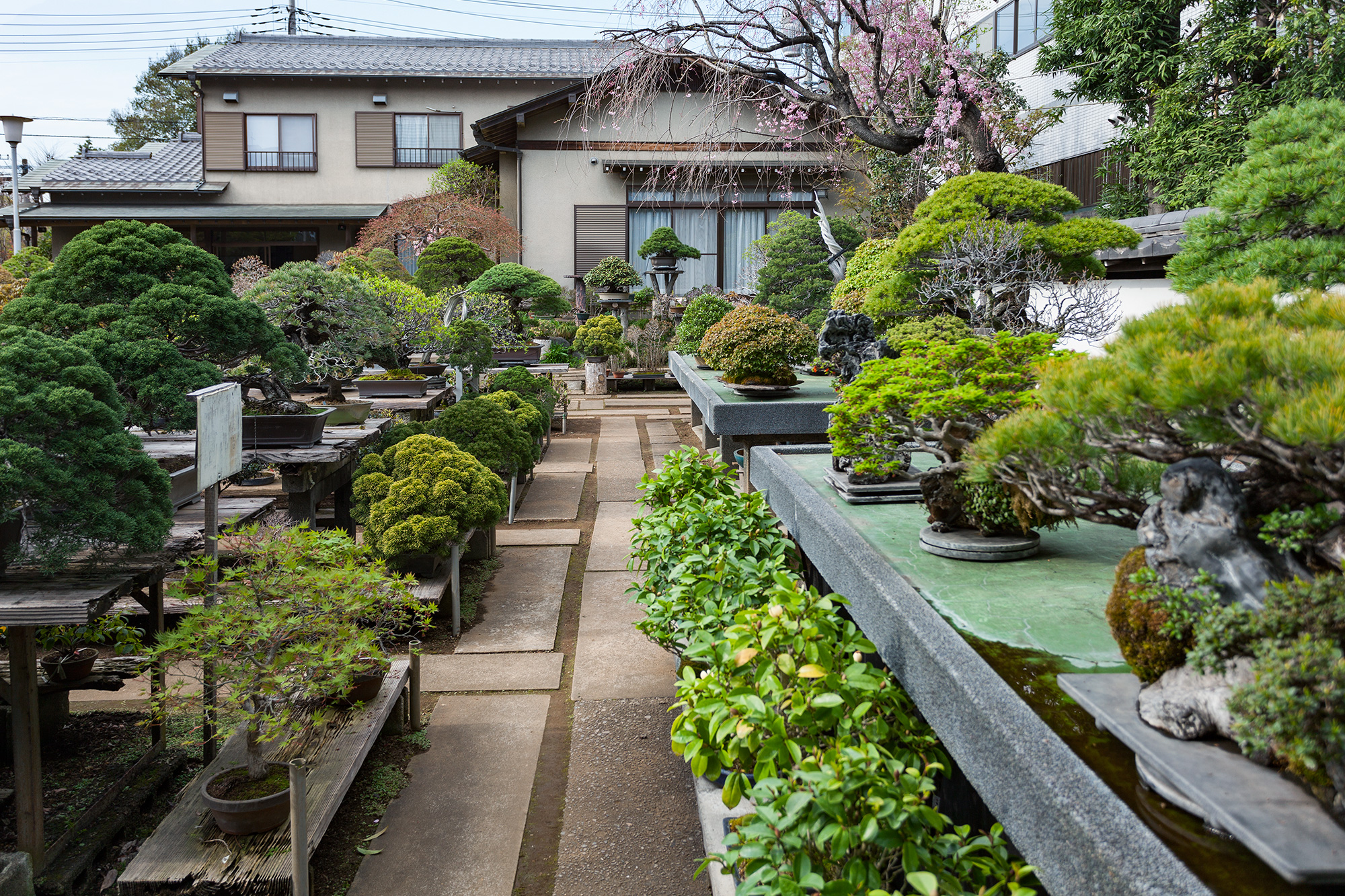
Ōmiya Bonsai Village

Kita-ku (北区, Kita-ku) is one of ten wards of the city of Saitama, in Saitama Prefecture, Japan, and is located in the northwestern part of the city. As of 1 March 2021, the ward had an estimated population of 148,935 and a population density of 8800 persons per km^{2}. Its total area was 16.86 square kilometres (6.51 sq mi).

== Geography ==
Kita-ward is located in the northwestern side of the city of Saitama.

=== Neighboring Municipalities ===
Saitama Prefecture

- Ageo
- Nishi-ku
- Ōmiya-ku
- Minuma-ku

== History ==
The villages of Ōsato, Nisshin, and Miyahara were created within Kitaadachi District, Saitama with the establishment of the municipalities system on April 1, 1889. The three villages were merged with Ōmiya Town in 1940, becoming part of the city of Ōmiya. On May 1, 2001, Ōmiya merged with Urawa and Yono cities to form the new city of Saitama. When Saitama was proclaimed a designated city in 2003, the northwestern portion of former Ōmiya city consisting of the three former villages and a portion of the original Ōmiya village became Kita Ward.

== Economy ==
A global automotive company, Calsonic Kansei, is headquartered in the ward.

== Education ==
Kita-ku has nine elementary schools, five junior high schools, three high schools and two special education schools.

Municipal junior high schools:

- Miyahara (宮原中学校)
- Nisshin (日進中学校)
- Taihei (泰平中学校)
- Toro (土呂中学校)
- Uetake (植竹中学校)

Municipal elementary schools:

- Higashi Onari (東大成小学校)
- Miyahara (宮原小学校)
- Nisshin (日進小学校)
- Nisshin Kita (日進北小学校)
- Omiya Bessho (大宮別所小学校)
- Osato (大砂土小学校)
- Taihei (泰平小学校)
- Tsubasa (つばさ小学校)
- Uetake (植竹小学校)

== Transportation ==
=== Railway ===
JR East – Takasaki Line

- Miyahara

JR East – Utsunomiya Line

- Toro

JR East – Kawagoe Line

- Nisshin
- Saitama New Urban Transit ("New Shuttle") - Ina Line
- Kamonomiya - Higashi-Miyahara - Konba - Yoshinohara

=== Highway ===
- National Route 16
- National Route 17

== Military facilities ==
- JGSDF Camp Ōmiya
- JGSDF Chemical School

== Local attractions ==
The "Ōmiya Bonsai Village" (officially "Bonsai-chō" (盆栽町, lit. "Bonsai Town")) was created after the 1923 Great Kantō earthquake when bonsai nurseries relocated from Tokyo to this area.

- The Railway Museum is located on the border with Ōmiya-ku.
