= Kawagoe City Industry and Tourism Center =

Commercial facility in Kawagoe City

- Interactive map of the Kawagoe City Industry and Tourism Center area
- Former names: Kagamiyama Brewery

General information
- Location: 1-10-1 shintomi-cho, Kawagoe, Saitama
- Coordinates: 35°54′58.58″N 139°29′0.35″E

The Kawagoe City Industry and Tourism Center is a commercial facility in Kawagoe City, Saitama Prefecture. It was established by Kawagoe City after converting sake storehouses (酒蔵) of the former sake brewery. The facility opened on October 1, 2010 with the nickname of ‘Koedo Kurari’.

== Origins and history ==
The Kawagoe City Industry and Tourism Center opened in October 2010 (22nd year of the Heisei Era) by preserving and renovating sake storehouses (酒蔵) (registered tangible cultural properties) of the former Kagamiyama Brewery, which started business in 1875 (8th year of the Meiji Era). The former Kagamiyama Brewery is the last sake brewery doing business in Kawagoe, with its sake storehouses (酒蔵) constructed in the Meiji era, Taisho Era and Showa Era remaining. It went out of business in 2000 (12th year of the Heisei Era). In order to meet a request from citizens to preserve and utilize the historical and cultural facilities, Kawagoe City obtained the land and the buildings to design and establish a facility for local industry and tourism. This facility is aimed at offering opportunities for citizens and tourists to mingle, revitalizing the city. Local products are displayed for sale. Sake storehouses (酒蔵) include Meiji Kura for souvenirs, Taisho Kura for a restaurant and Showa kura for sake tasting.

The origin of its nickname ‘Koedo Kurari’: ‘Koedo’ is the nickname of Kawagoe City. The word ‘Koedo’ was combined with ‘Kura’ which relates to Kawagoe’s famous Kurazukuri, and ‘Ri’ which is associated with one’s home.

== History ==
- 1875 (8th year of the Meiji Era) Kagamiyama Brewery started business
- 2000 (12th year of the Heisei Era) Kagamiyama Brewery went out of business
- 2008 (20th year of the Heisei Era) Three storehouses of former Kagamiyama Brewery were registered as tangible cultural property
- 2010 (22nd year of the Heisei Era) Kawagoe City Industry and Tourism Center (Koedo Kurari) opened
- 2018 (30th year of the Heisei Era) Showa kura renewal opened (sake tasting)

== Architectural overview ==
- Address: 1-10-1 shintomi-cho, Kawagoe, Saitama
- Use districts: industrial districts, building coverage ratio 80% floor-area ratio 400%
- Fire prevention districts: quasi-fire prevention districts
- Site area: 3,064.09 m^{2}
- Total floor area: 1,234 m^{2}
- Meiji Kura: 419 m^{2}, two-story storehouse building, partly one-story, constructed in the middle Meiji Era
- Taisho Kura: 305 m^{2}, two-story wooden building, partly one-story, constructed in the early Taisho Era
- Showa Kura: 232 m^{2}, two-story storehouse building, constructed in the sixth year of the Showa Era
- Tenji kura: 278 m^{2} one-story wooden building, construction date unknown
- Open space: 500 m^{2}

== Cultural properties ==
Registered tangible cultural property (structures) Registration date: March 7, 2008 (20th year of the Heisei Era) Type: Industrial second/Structures Registration criteria: contributing to historical scenery of national land

- Former Kagamiyama Brewery Meiji Kura

Date 1868–1911 (middle Meiji Era) construction, two-story storehouse building, partly one-story tile-roofing building area

- Former Kgamiyama Brewery Taisho Kura

Date 1912–1925 (early Taisho Era) construction, two-story wooden building, partly one-story tile-roofing building area

- Former Kagamiyama Brewery Showa Kura

Date 1931 (Showa Era) construction, two-story storehouse building, tile-roofing, building area

== See also ==
- Kawagoe Station
- Hon-Kawagoe Station
- Kawagoe, Saitama

== Related items ==
- Kawagoe City’s Koedo Kurari Kagamiyama Brewery, originating in the eighth year of the Meiji Era, was converted to Koedo Kurari (registered tangible cultural property) by Koedo Kurari, kept at the National Diet Library.
