= Kawagoe Festival Museum =

Museum in Kawagoe, Japan

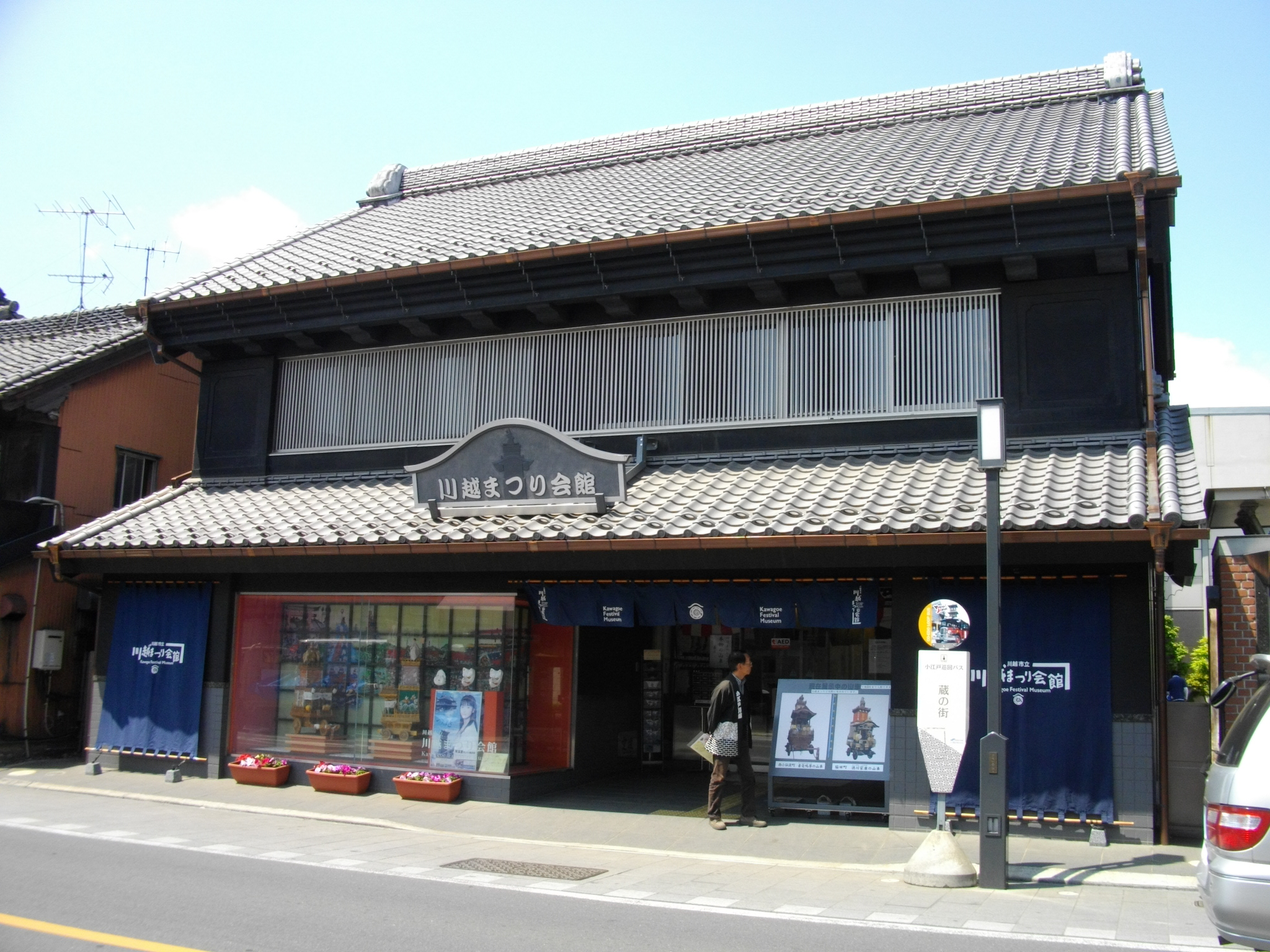
- Location: 2-1-10 Moto-machi, Kawagoe, Saitama
- Coordinates: 35°55′27.5″N 139°28′56.5″E

Kawagoe Festival Museum (川越まつり会館) is a Kawagoe City local museum in Kawagoe City, Saitama Prefecture.

== Features ==
The Kawagoe Festival Museum opened on September 28, 2003 with displays related to the tradition of the Kawagoe Festival. The Kawagoe Festival is designated a National Important Intangible Folk Cultural Property. The building is designed in the Kurazukuri style, which is prevalent in Kawagoe.

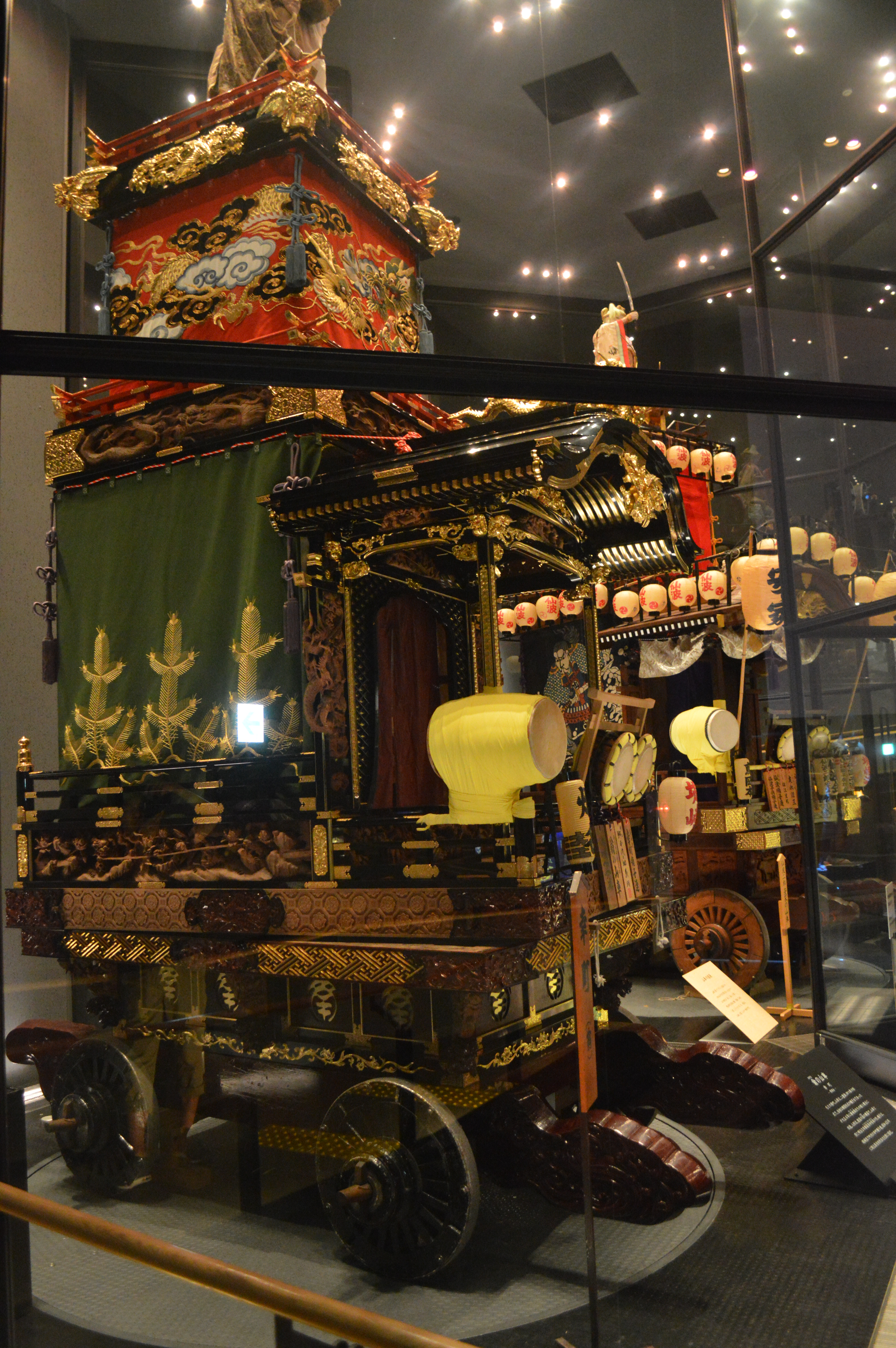
Exhibition of floats

In the exhibition hall, two floats (山車) which are actually used in the festival are displayed with a regular change of its kind. On Sundays and public holidays, Ohayashi performances are played by local neighborhoods (twice a day at 13:30 and 14:30). It also exhibits the transition and the history of the festival as well as preparation for the festival. Actual images of the festival and the Ohayashi performances are on display. Special exhibitions highlight features of the local Kawagoe culture, during and after the Edo period.

== See also ==
- Kawagoe Hikawa Festival
