= Matoba Station =

Railway station in Kawagoe, Saitama Prefecture, Japan

Matoba Station 的場駅
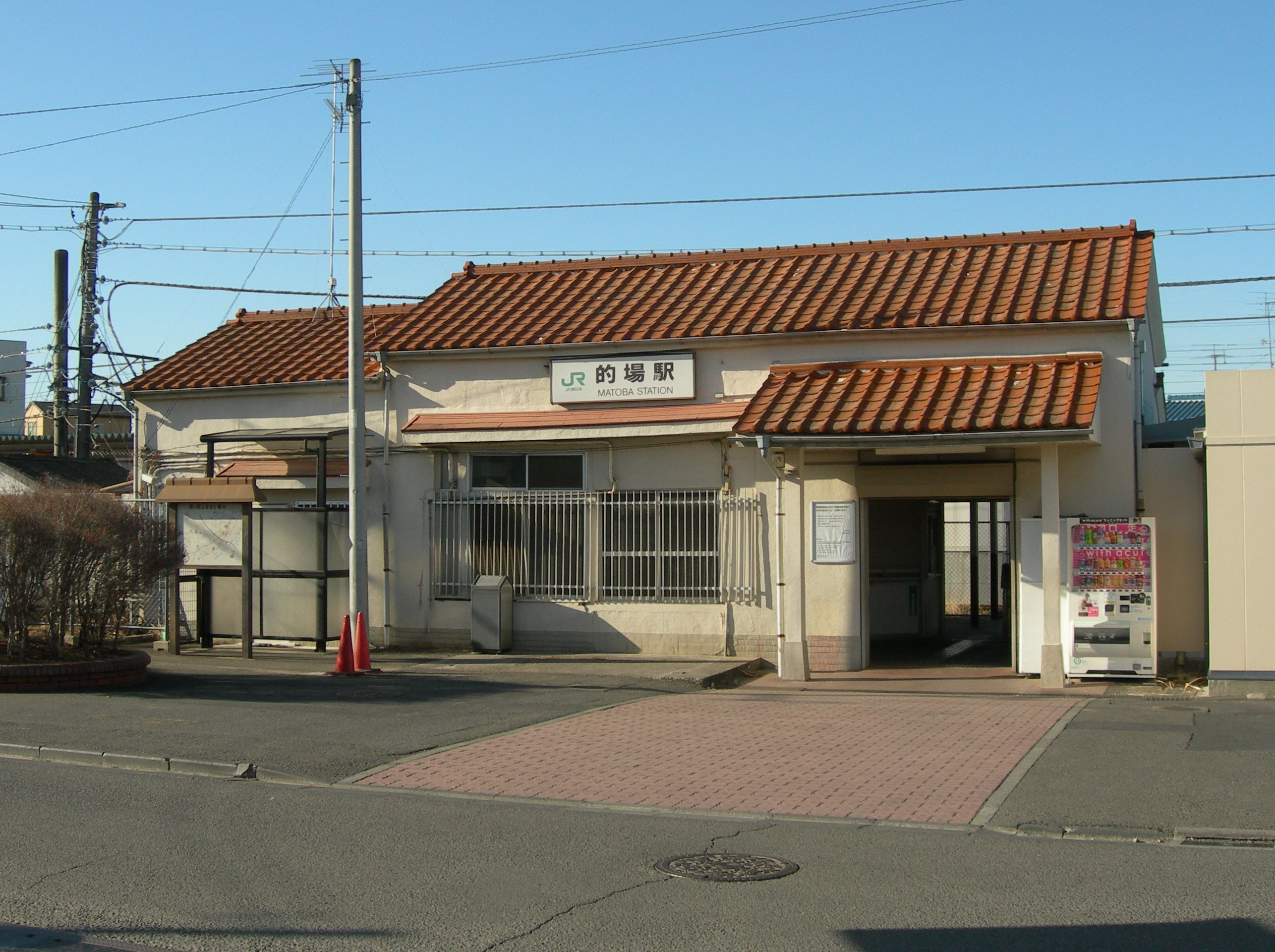
- Matoba Station entrance in February 2010

General information
- Location: 1314 Matoba, Kawagoe-shi, Saitama-ken 350–1102; Japan
- Coordinates: 35°55′3.50″N 139°26′9.84″E
- Operator: JR East
- Line: ■ Kawagoe Line
- Distance: 4.8 km from Kawagoe
- Platforms: 1 island platform
- Tracks: 2
- Connections: Bus stop

Other information
- Status: Staffed
- Website: Official website

History
- Opened: 22 July 1940

Passengers
- FY2019: 3,021 (daily, boarding only)

Services
Preceding station	JR East	Following station
Kasahata towards Komagawa	Kawagoe Line	Nishi-Kawagoe towards Kawagoe
Location
- Location within Saitama Prefecture Location within Japan

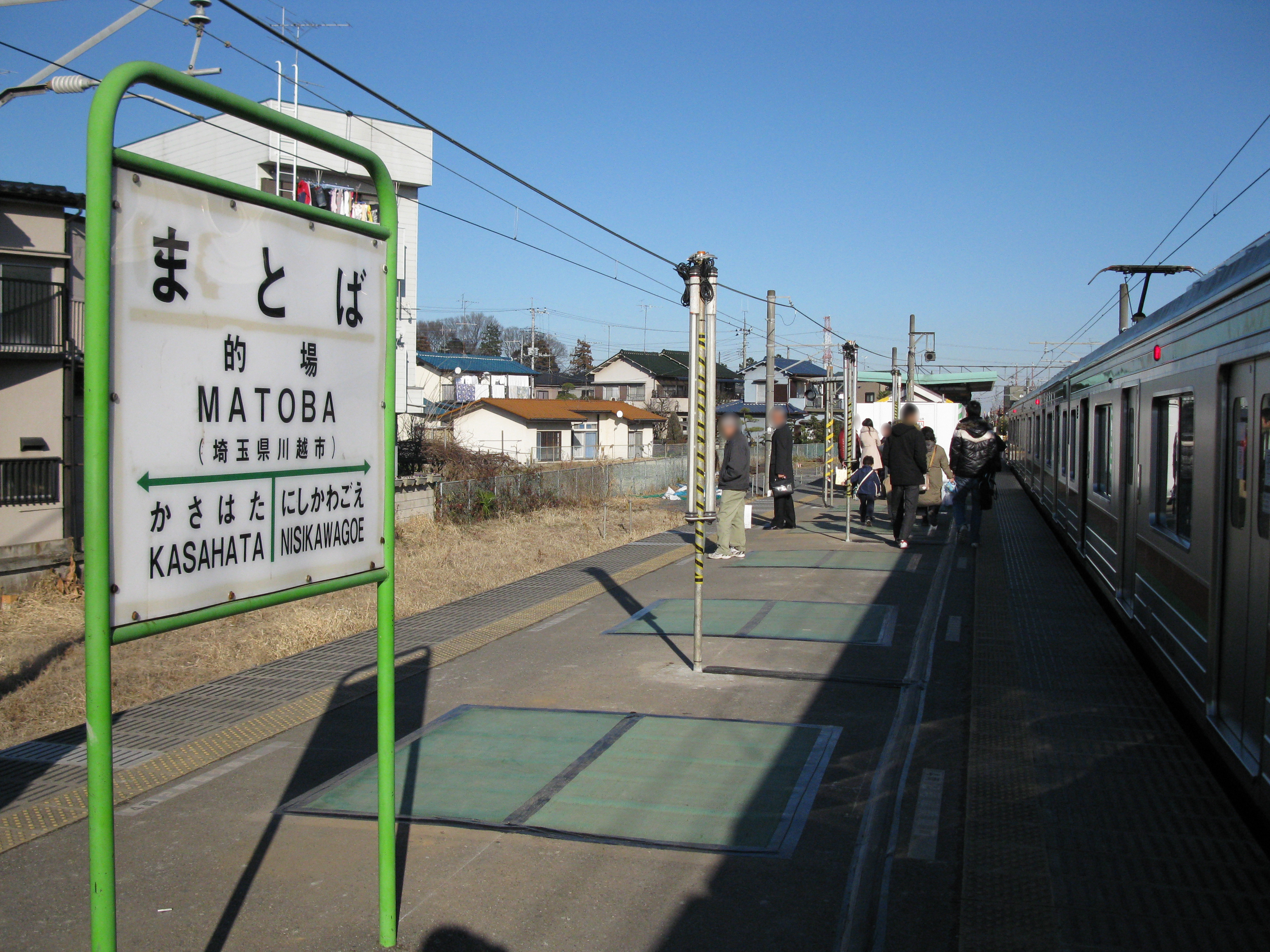
View of the platforms looking east in January 2009

Matoba Station (的場駅, Matoba-eki) is a passenger railway station located in the city of Kawagoe, Saitama, Japan, operated by the East Japan Railway Company (JR East).

== Lines ==
Matoba Station is served by the Kawagoe Line between Kawagoe and Komagawa, and is located 4.8 km from Kawagoe. Services operate every 20 minutes during the daytime, with some services continuing to and from Hachiōji on the Hachikō Line.

== Station layout ==
The station consists of an island platform serving two tracks. Many trains cross here on the otherwise single line. The station is staffed.

=== Platforms ===
1	■ Kawagoe Line	for Komagawa and Hachiōji
2	■ Kawagoe Line	for Kawagoe

== History ==
The station opened on 22 July 1940. With the privatization of Japanese National Railways (JNR) on 1 April 1987, the station came under the control of JR East.

== Passenger statistics ==
In fiscal 2019, the station was used by an average of 3021 passengers daily (boarding passengers only). The passenger figures for previous years are as shown below.

Fiscal year	Daily average
2000	2,848
2005	2,956
2010	2,972
2015	3,082

== Surrounding area ==
- Tokyo International University
- Shobi University
- Kasumigaseki Station (Tōbu Tōjō Line)

Matoba Station is approximately a 10-minute walk from the Kawagoe-Matoba Bus Stop on the Kan-Etsu Expressway, which is served by long-distance bus services operated by Seibu Bus to destinations including Niigata, Toyama, Nagano, Karuizawa, and Kanazawa.

== See also ==
- List of railway stations in Japan
