= Taisho-roman Street =

Street in Kawagoe City, Saitama Prefecture, Japan

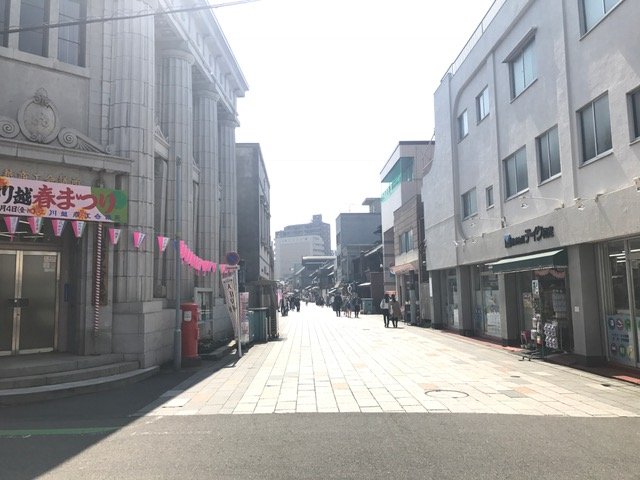
Taisho-roman street

Taisho-roman Street, meaning Taisho Romance Street, is a local shopping street in Kawagoe City, Saitama Prefecture, Japan.

== Highlights ==
About 30 stores and restaurants line about 200-metre (660 ft) street, which is gently winding as a characteristic of the castle town to prepare for wars. The façade of some shops dates from Taisho era (1912-1926) and some have been in business for nearly 100 years. At the northern end of the street, Kawagoe Chamber of Commerce and Industry is located. It was built in the style of Renaissance Revival style with impressive Doric columns for Bushu Bank Kawagoe Branch. The street has been used as a setting in several Japanese movies, TV dramas and commercials in nostalgic air with granite flagstones.

== History ==
It used to be an arcade shopping district called Ginza Shopping Street and one of the biggest shopping streets in Saitama Prefecture from Taisho to early Showa era. It waned in popularity as commercial heart of the city moved to Crea Mall, it was redeveloped on the theme of Taisho Romance by removing the arcade in 1995 and laying power lines underground in 2001. Located between Ichibangai Street representing Edo to Meiji era called Kurazukuri Zone and modern Crea Mall, Taisho-roman Street attracts tourists from home and abroad representing Taisho era.
