= Nishi-Kawagoe Station =

Railway station in Kawagoe, Saitama Prefecture, Japan

Nishi-Kawagoe Station 西川越駅
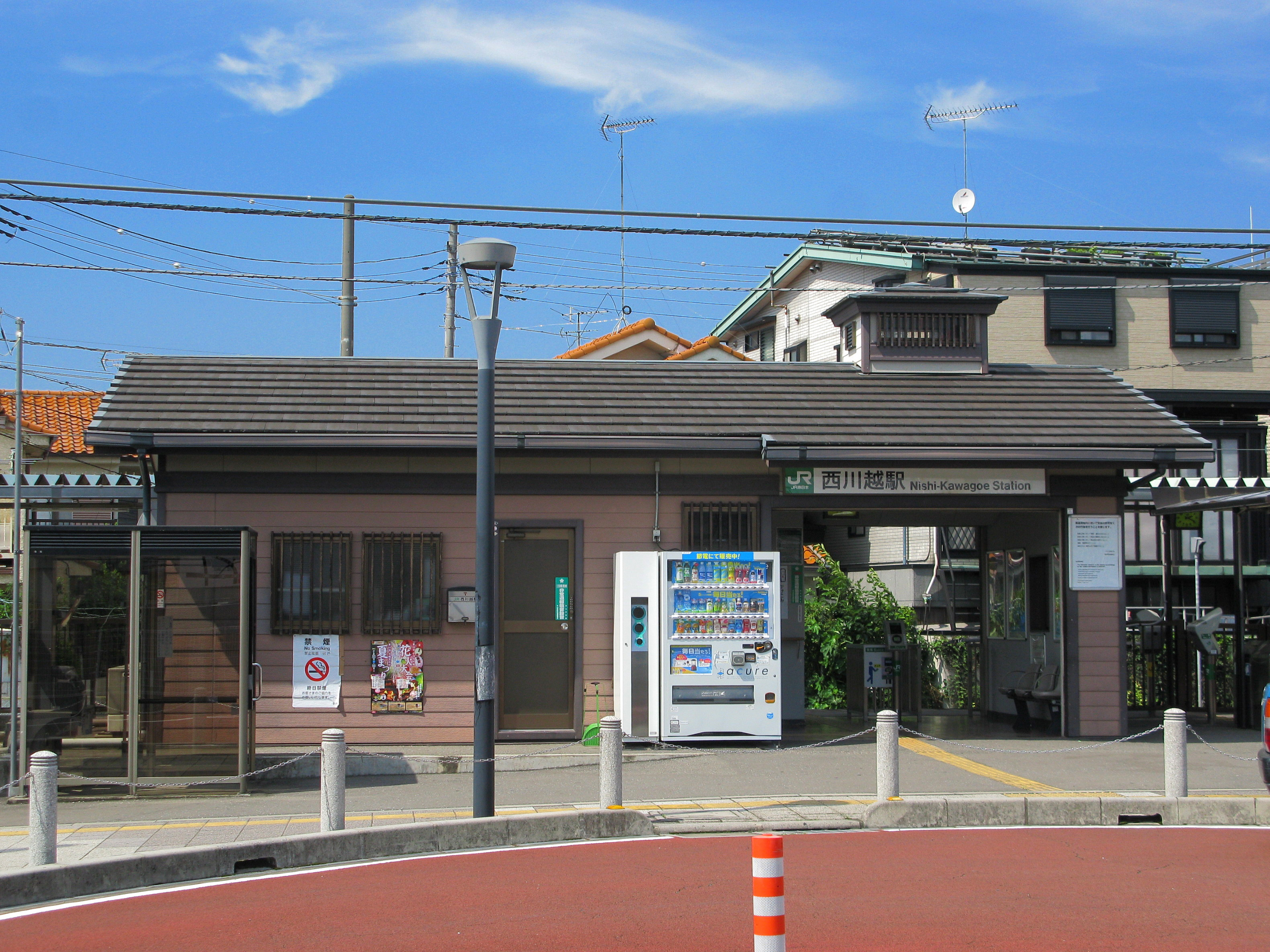
- Nishi-Kawagoe Station entrance in July 2012

General information
- Other names: 1 side platform
- Location: Ogaya, Kawagoe-shi, Saitama-ken 350–1104; Japan
- Coordinates: 35°55′9.0084″N 139°27′34.15″E
- Operator: JR East
- Line: ■ Kawagoe Line
- Distance: 2.6 km from Kawagoe
- Platforms: 1 side platform
- Tracks: 1
- Connections: Bus stop

Other information
- Status: Staffed
- Website: Official website

History
- Opened: 22 July 1940

Passengers
- FY2019: 1,337 daily

Services
Preceding station	JR East	Following station
Matoba towards Komagawa	Kawagoe Line	Kawagoe Terminus
Location
- Location within Saitama Prefecture Location within Japan

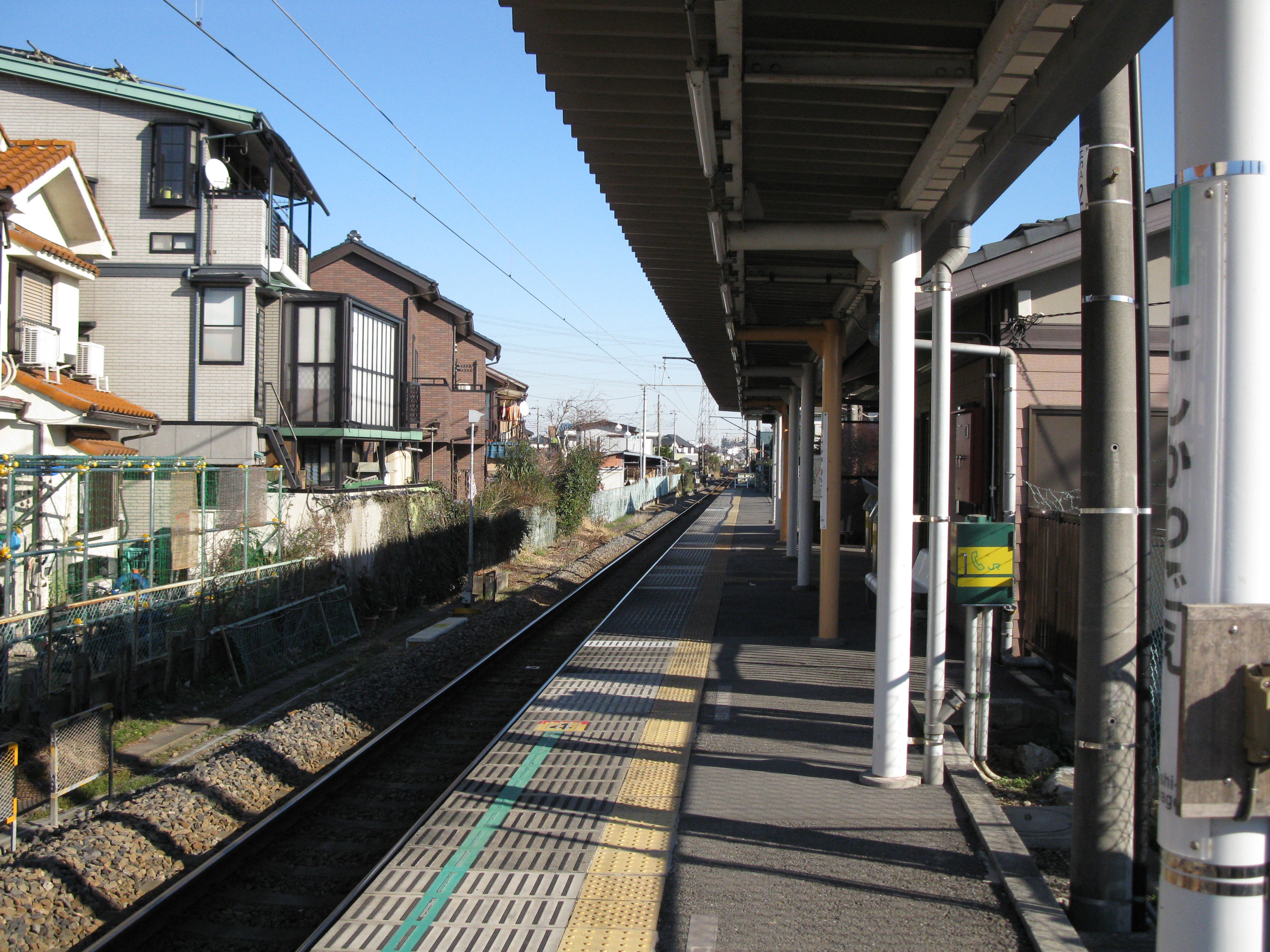
View of the platform looking east in January 2009

Nishi-Kawagoe Station (西川越駅, Nishi-Kawagoe-eki) is a passenger railway station located in the city of Kawagoe, Saitama, Japan, operated by the East Japan Railway Company (JR East).

== Lines ==
Nishi-Kawagoe Station is served by the Kawagoe Line between Kawagoe and Komagawa, and is located 2.6 km from Kawagoe. Services operate every 20 minutes during the daytime, with some services continuing to and from Hachiōji on the Hachikō Line.

== Station layout ==
The station has one unnumbered side platform serving a single bidirectional track. The station structure is located on the south side of the track. The station is staffed.

=== Platforms ===
■ Kawagoe Line	for Kawagoe, Komagawa, and Hachiōji

== History ==
The station opened on 22 July 1940. With the privatization of Japanese National Railways (JNR) on 1 April 1987, the station came under the control of JR East.

== Passenger statistics ==
In fiscal 2019, the station was used by an average of 1337 passengers daily (boarding passengers only). The passenger figures for previous years are as shown below.

Fiscal year	Daily average
2000	1,050
2005	1,156
2010	1,225
2015	1,403

== See also ==
- List of railway stations in Japan
