= Toho College of Music =

Private university in Tokyo, Japan

Coordinates: 35°53′50.4″N 139°31′25.2″E

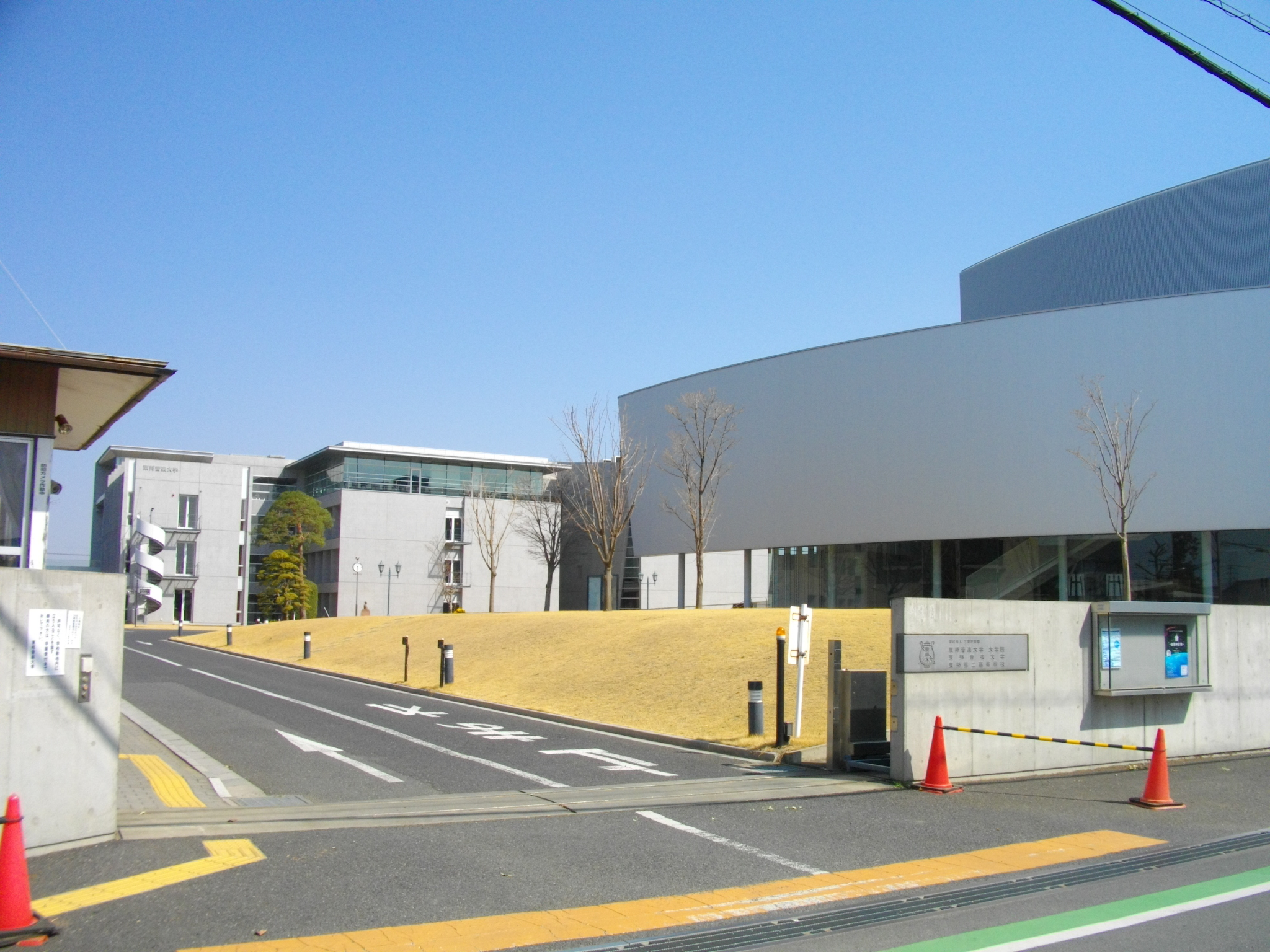
Toho College of Music, Kawagoe Campus

Toho College of Music (東邦音楽大学, Tōhō Ongaku Daigaku) is a private university in Kawagoe, Saitama and Bunkyo-ku, Tokyo, Japan, established in 1965. The predecessor of the school was founded as Otsuka Branch of Tokyo Music Conservatory (東京高等音楽学院大塚分教場; Tōkyō Kōtō Ongakuin Otsuka Bunkyōjō—now known as Kunitachi College of Music) in 1934.
