= Kawagoe Hikawa Festival =

Japanese traditional festival

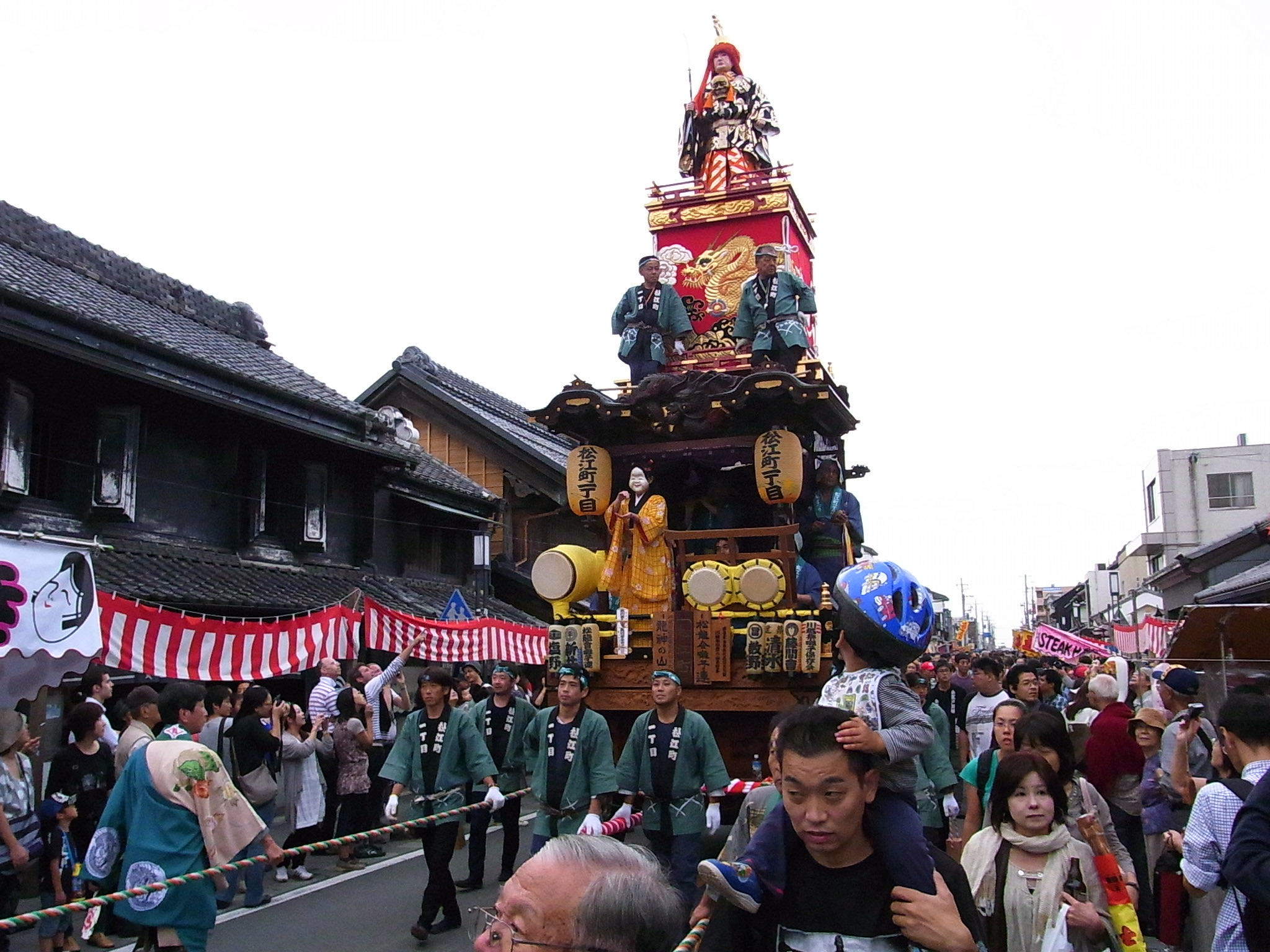

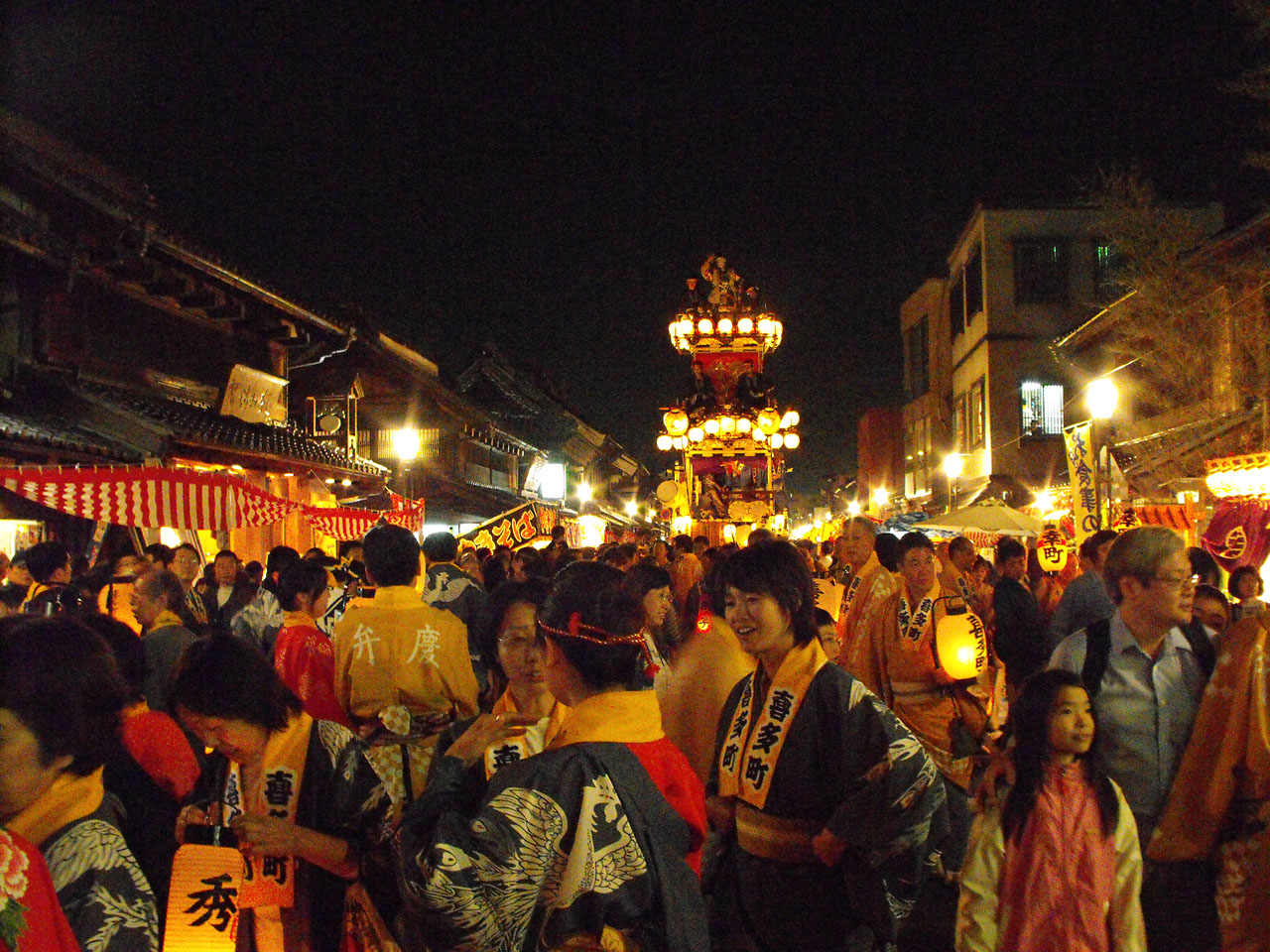

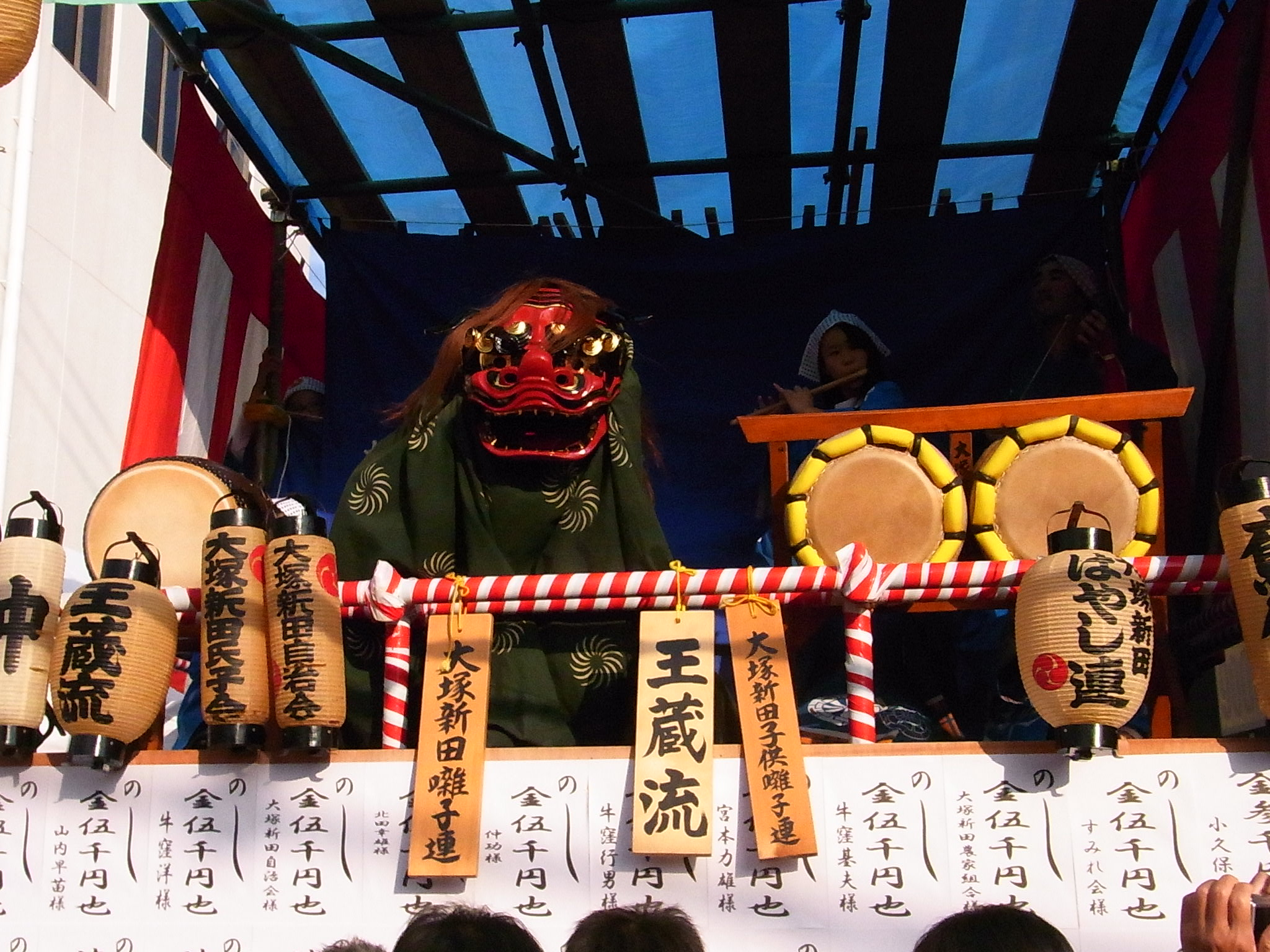

The Kawagoe Festival, officially named the Kawagoe Hikawa Festival (川越氷川祭, Kawagoe Hikawa Matsuri) is a traditional Japanese festival held annually on the third weekend of October in Kawagoe City, Saitama Prefecture. It is Kawagoe's biggest event and the festival has more than a 360-year history. It attracts around one million tourists during the two days. The grand pageant of the festival takes place in the castle town of Kawagoe including in the old storehouse zone called Kurazukuri Zone.

In 2005, the festival was designated as a National Important Intangible Folk Cultural Property under the title of "Kawagoe Hikawa Festival Float Event", and in 2016, the festival was put on the UNESCO Intangible Cultural Heritage list as one of the "Yama, Hoko, Yatai, Float Festivals in Japan".

== Highlights ==
The biggest highlight of Kawagoe Festival is "Hikkawase", or musical battles among floats. About 50 members of different neighborhoods put their respective festival floats as they walk through the down town district. When festival floats from different neighborhoods meet at an intersection or other spot, they make turn the float stage to face each other and begin to battle by performing their dance and music called "Ohayashi".

Ohayashi is the musical accompaniment played by five musicians namely 1 flute, 1 large drum, 2 small drums and 1 handbell. Together with dancers with a mask of a fox or a lion, they play a great performance and dancing on the stage of the float.

As the music and dance grow in intensity, the float pullers and the audience shout encouragement to their performers. In the evening, the festival reaches its climax as the float pullers hold lanterns that illuminate the festival float beautifully.

== Floats ==
The main attraction of the festival is its large fleet of gorgeous floats. There are 29 floats kept by each neighborhood in the town, and about 20 of them actually take part in the festival.

The float has two remarkable features. One is Edo type double-decked float topped with a doll. The lower level is a small decorated festival stage fitted out with a roof, and the upper level is a platform with a doll on it. The platform where a doll is displayed on is like a movable, manually operated elevator, and the doll and the upper level can be stored inside the lower level's bunting behind the stage, changing its total height from 8m to 4m.

The dolls have their origins in traditional Japanese culture such as Noh plays and folk stories, or are modeled from historical figures. Each float is often called by the name of the figure from who the doll was modeled from.

The other feature is the stage which can revolve 360° horizontally, separately from the wheels. It is intended to make it possible for the stage to face each other when floats from different neighborhoods happen to meet in the middle of the festival and enjoy musical battles called "Hikkawase".

== History ==
It is said that the Kawagoe Festival dates back to the middle of the 17th century, when the lord of Kawagoe Domain Matsudaira Nobutsuna donated a portable shrine and other festival-related items to Hikawa Shrine, which originally had just one festival called "Reitaisai" to show their appreciation to good harvest. Since the 'Reitaisai' could be joined only by shrine priests, the lord concerned that the town lacked a big festival.

His donation prompted the shrine to hold another festival called "Jinkosaii", which was soon joined by 10 neighborhoods of the shrine.

Today's Kawagoe festival consists of "Jinkosai" and town people's festival following the "Jinkosai". The festival was gradually developed as it incorporated the style of the festivals of Edo, such as San-no Festival or Kanda Festival.

These festivals called Tenka Matsuri were sponsored and attended by the shōgun (ruler of Japan) during the Edo Period, and were appealing to Kawagoe merchants. Success in boat transport on the Shingashi River linked to Edo made Kawagoe merchants prosper and gave them the opportunities to see the latest trend in Edo.

These Kawagoe merchants amazed by the splendor and size of Tenka Matsuri tried to introduce Edo style to Kawagoe festival in the early 19th century. They asked the craftmen who made floats for Tenka Matsuri to make the same type of float for Kawagoe festival. Only because double-decked floats were used for Tenka Matsuri, the same type of double-decked floats were introduced to Kawagoe Festival. At Tenka Matsuri, they needed to show the floats to shōgun, the sponsor of the festival, going through the castle gate, which was not high enough by lowering its height.

After the collapse of the shōgun government, festivals with floats saw a decline in Tokyo, while the Kawagoe Festival only developed further. Some districts of Kawagoe even made new floats and revolving stages were adopted for Ohayashi performance. After World War II, some neighborhoods other than the original 10 neighborhoods started to join the festival, and the number of the participating neighborhoods is increasing. Today, 29 floats are kept in the town with 28 owned by neighborhoods and one owned by Kawagoe City.
