= Kawagoe Station =

Railway station in Kawagoe, Saitama Prefecture, Japan

Kawagoe Station 川越駅
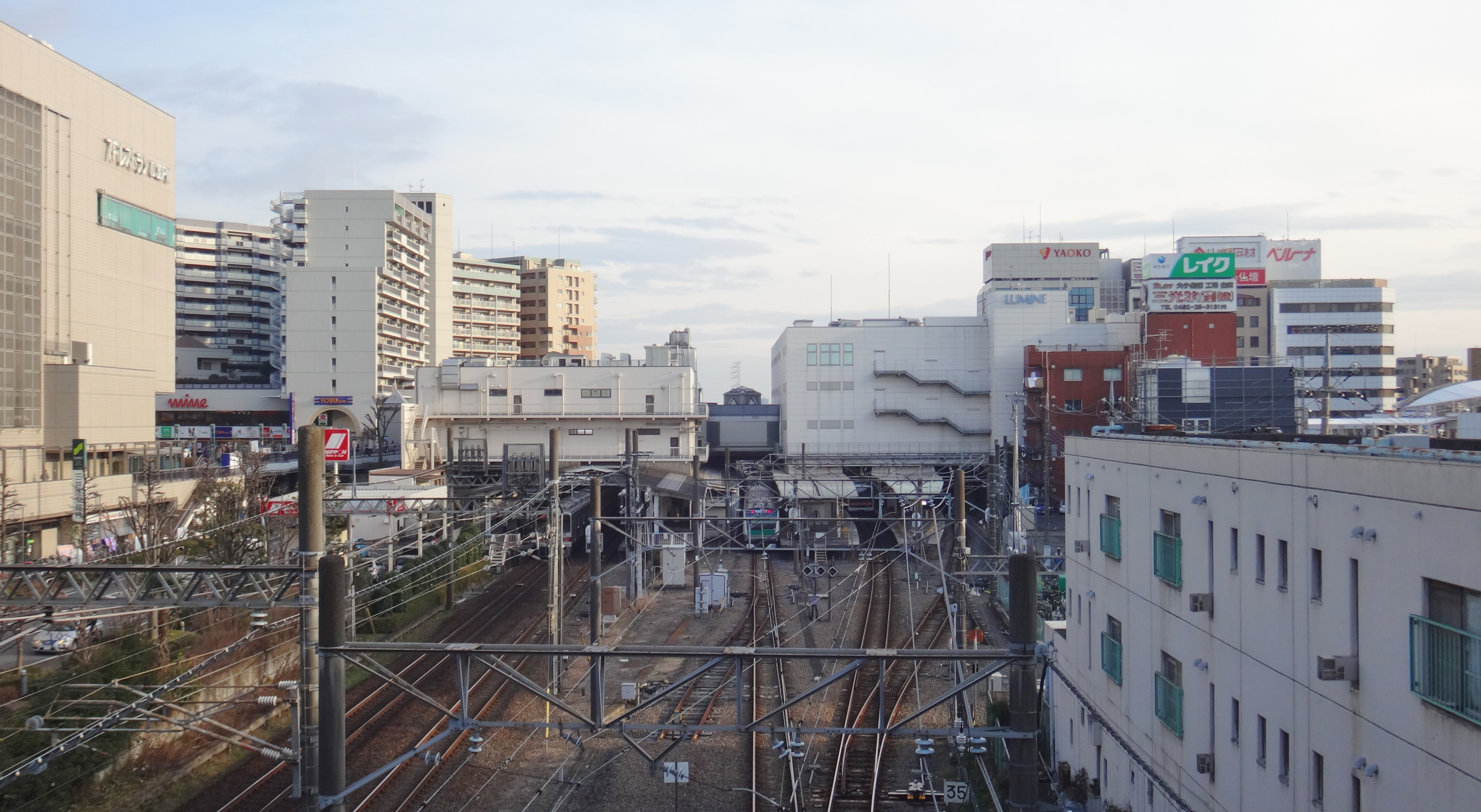
- Overall view of Kawagoe Station in February 2016, with the Tobu tracks on the left

General information
- Location: Kawagoe-shi, Saitama-ken; Japan
- Coordinates: 35°54′25″N 139°28′58″E
- Operator: Tōbu Railway; JR East
- Lines: ■ Tōbu Tōjō Line; ■ Kawagoe Line

History
- Opened: 1 April 1915
Location
- Location within Saitama Prefecture Location within Japan

Kawagoe Station (川越駅, Kawagoe-eki) is an interchange passenger railway station in located in the city of Kawagoe, Saitama, Japan, operated by the private railway operator Tōbu Railway and East Japan Railway Company (JR East).

== Lines ==
The Tōbu station is served by the Tōbu Tōjō Line from Ikebukuro in Tokyo to Ogawamachi and Yorii, with some services inter-running via the Tokyo Metro Yurakucho Line to Shin-Kiba and the Tokyo Metro Fukutoshin Line to Shibuya and onward via the Tokyu Toyoko Line and Minato Mirai Line to Motomachi-Chukagai. Located between Shingashi and Kawagoeshi, it is 30.5 km from the Ikebukuro terminus.

The JR East station is located on the Kawagoe Line with services eastward to Ōmiya, Ōsaki via the Saikyō Line, and Shin-Kiba via the Rinkai Line, and westward to Komagawa and Hachiōji via the Hachikō Line.

== Station layout ==
The Tōbu and JR East stations are arranged side-by-side, with the Tōbu platforms on the east side and the JR East platforms on the west side. The elevated station building and concourse has exits on the east and west sides.

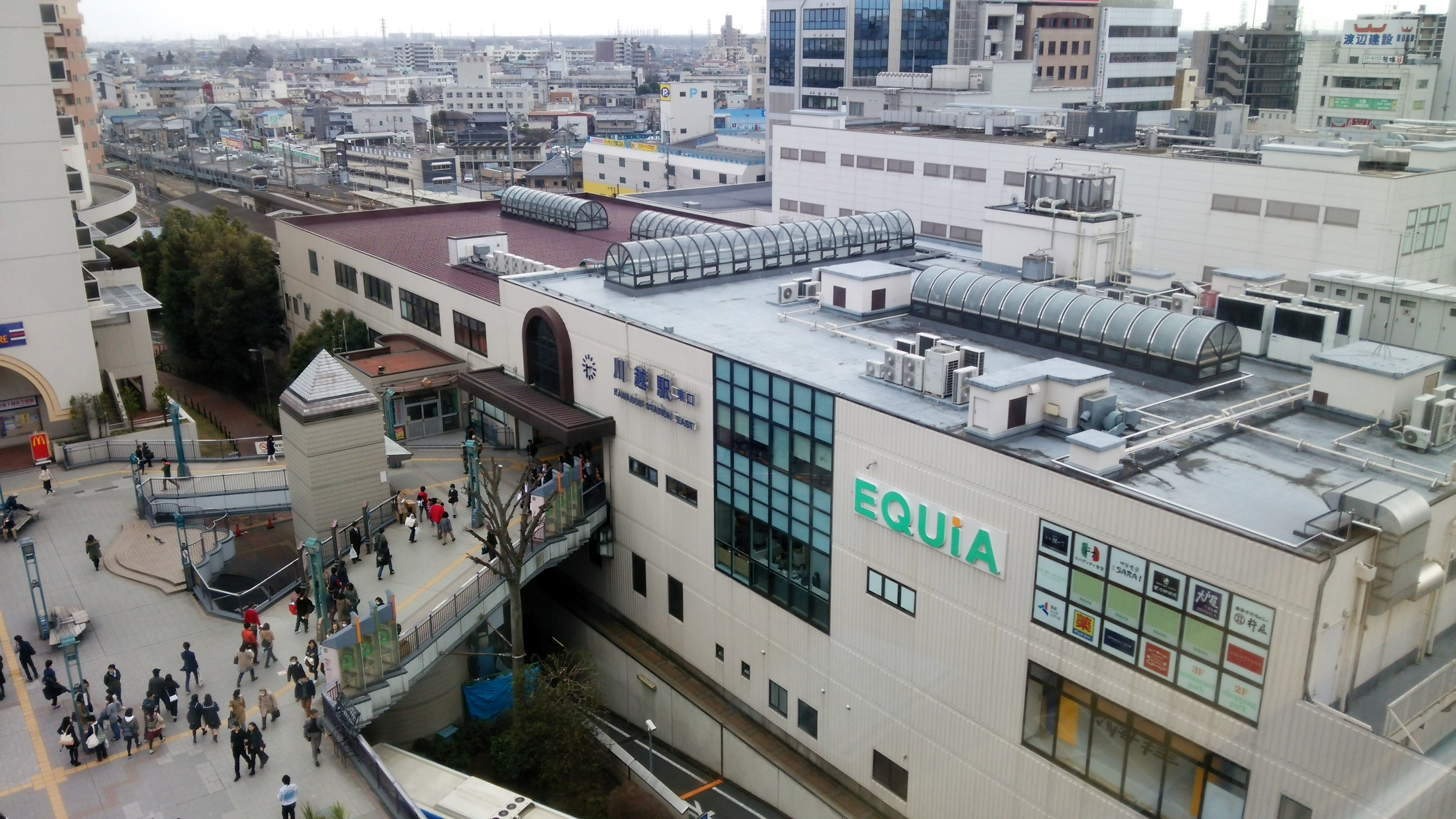
The east entrance in March 2016

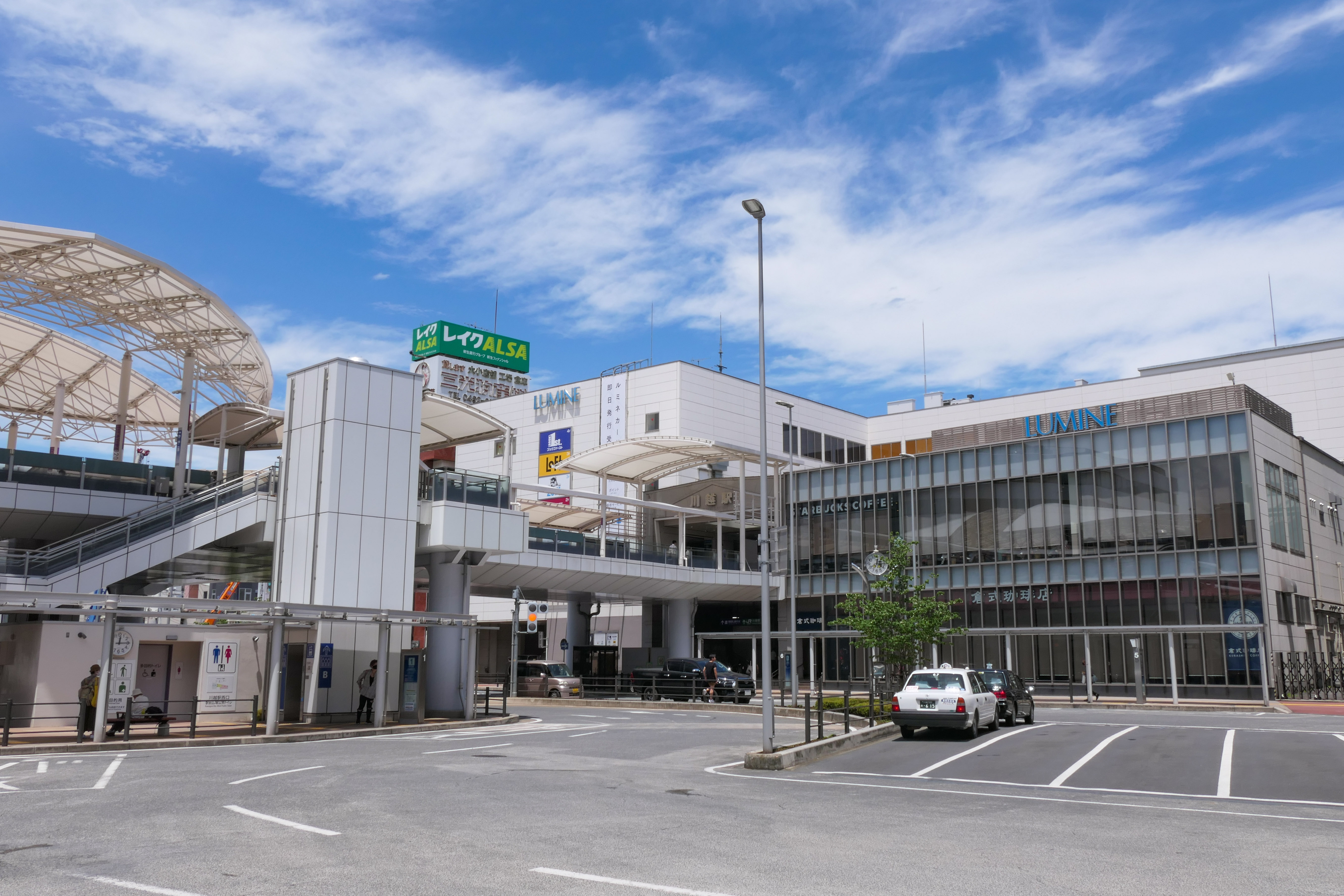
The west entrance in July 2021

== Tōbu Railway ==
TJ21 Kawagoe Station 川越駅
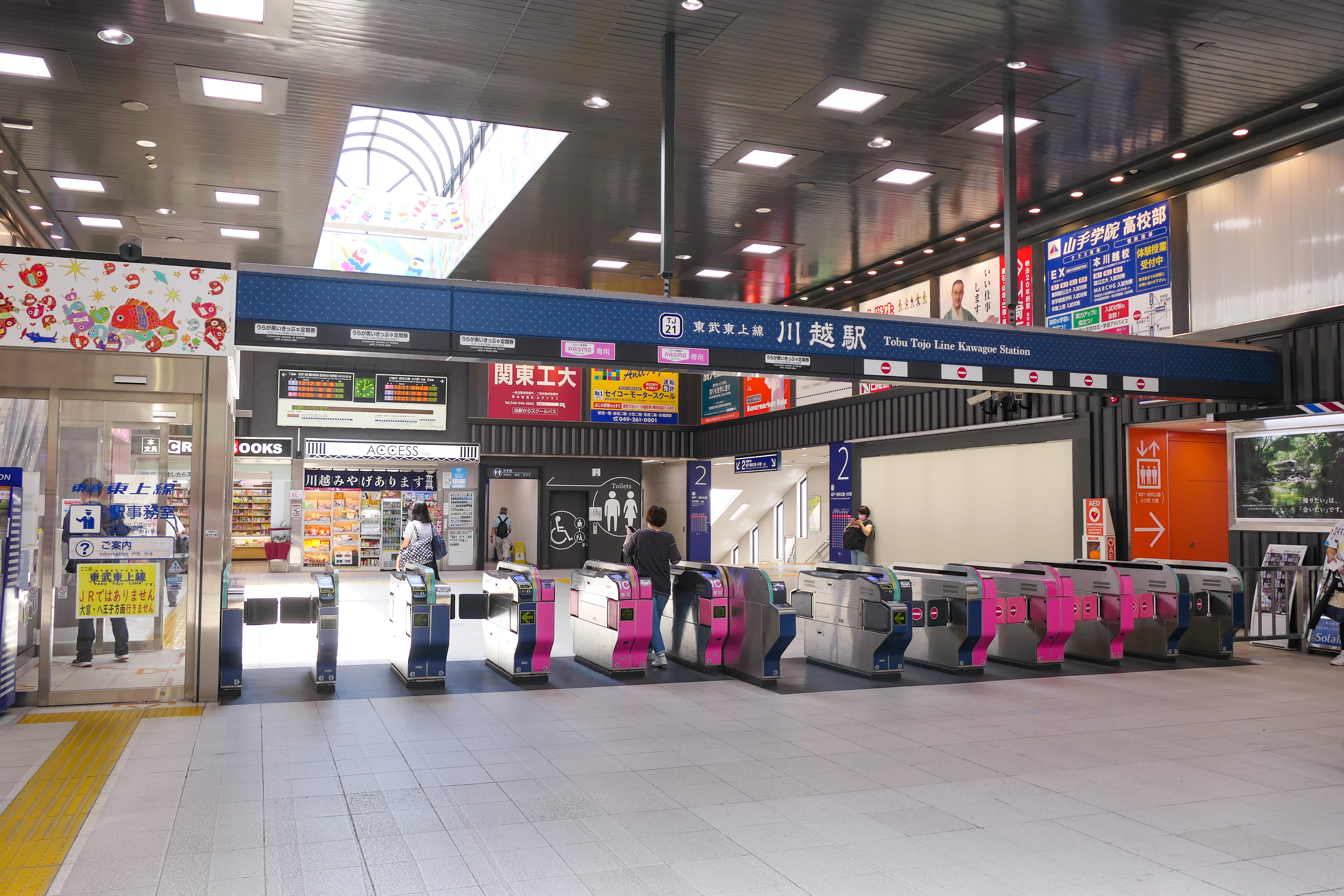
- The Tōbu ticket barriers in July 2021

General information
- Location: 24-9 Wakita-machi, Kawagoe-shi, Saitama-ken 350–1122; Japan
- Operator: Tōbu Railway
- Line: Tōbu Tōjō Line
- Distance: 30.5 km from Ikebukuro
- Platforms: 2 side platforms
- Tracks: 2

Other information
- Station code: TJ-21
- Website: Official website

History
- Opened: 1 April 1915
- Former names: Kawagoe-nishimachi (1915–1940)

Passengers
- FY2019: 124,534 daily

Services
Preceding station	Tobu Railway	Following station
Kawagoeshi TJ22 towards Ogawamachi	TJ Liner	Fujimino TJ18 towards Ikebukuro
Sakado One-way operation	TJ Liner	Fujimino TJ18 towards Ikebukuro
Kawagoeshi TJ22 towards Ogawamachi	Kawagoe	Asakadai TJ14 towards Ikebukuro
Kawagoeshi TJ22 towards Yorii	Tojo Line Rapid Express	Asakadai TJ14 towards Ikebukuro
Kawagoeshi TJ22 towards Ogawamachi	F Liner	Asakadai TJ14 towards Motomachi-Chūkagai
Kawagoeshi TJ22 towards Yorii	Tojo Line Express	Fujimino TJ18 towards Ikebukuro
Kawagoeshi TJ22 towards Yorii	Tojo Line Semi Express Local	Shingashi TJ20 towards Ikebukuro
Location

=== Platforms ===
The station consists of two side platforms serving two tracks. This station has a season ticket sales office. Chest-high platform edge doors were installed in February 2018, and brought into use from March 2018.

1	Tobu Tojo Line	for Fujimino, Wakōshi, and Ikebukuro; Tokyo Metro Yurakucho Line for Shin-Kiba; Tokyo Metro Fukutoshin Line for Shibuya; Tōkyū Tōyoko Line for Hiyoshi and Yokohama; Tōkyū Shin-Yokohama Line for Shin-Yokohama via Sōtetsu Shin-Yokohama Line for Shōnandai; Minatomirai Line for Motomachi-Chukagai
2	Tobu Tojo Line	for Sakado, Shinrinkōen, Ogawamachi, and Yorii

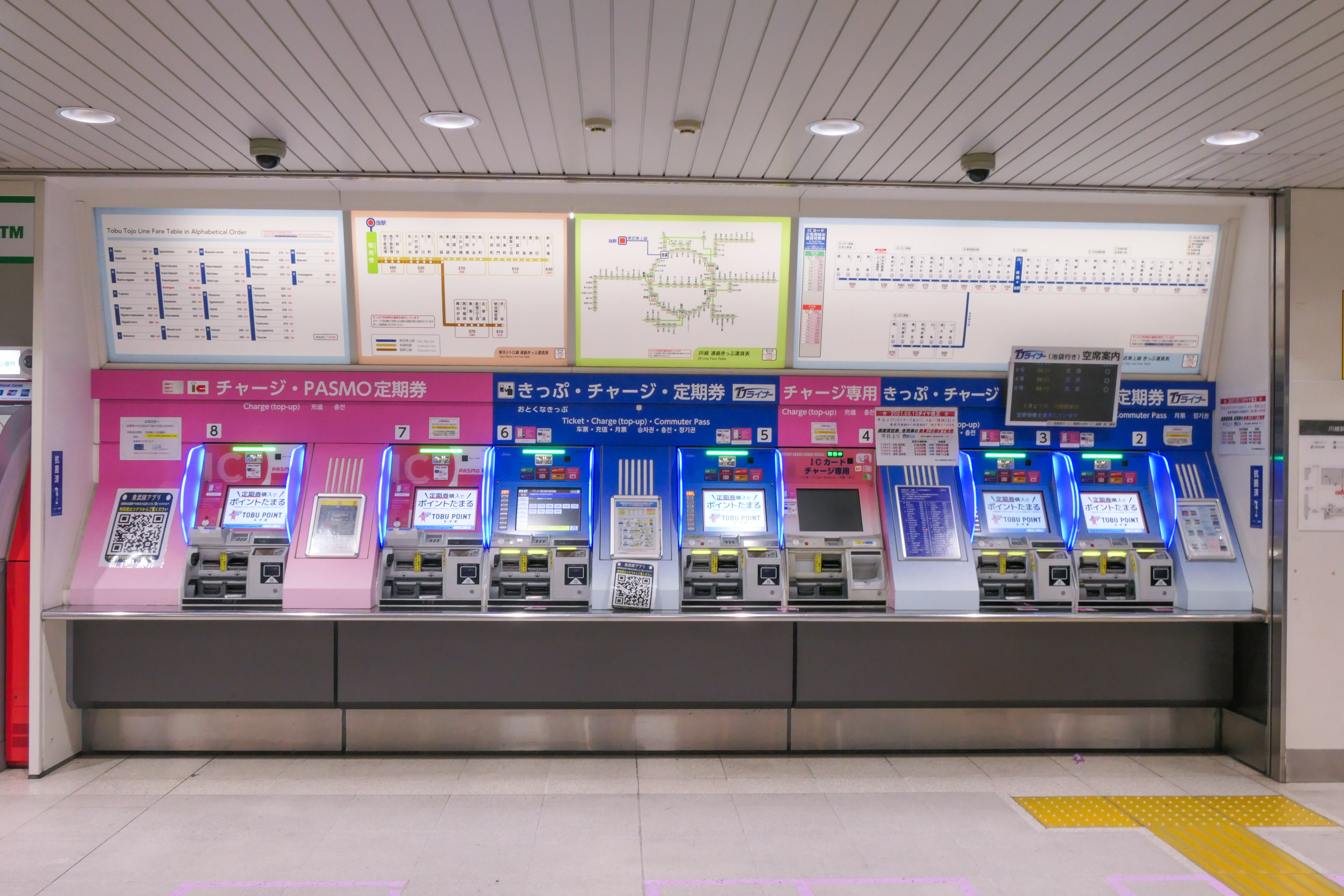
Tōbu Railway ticket vending machines in July 2021

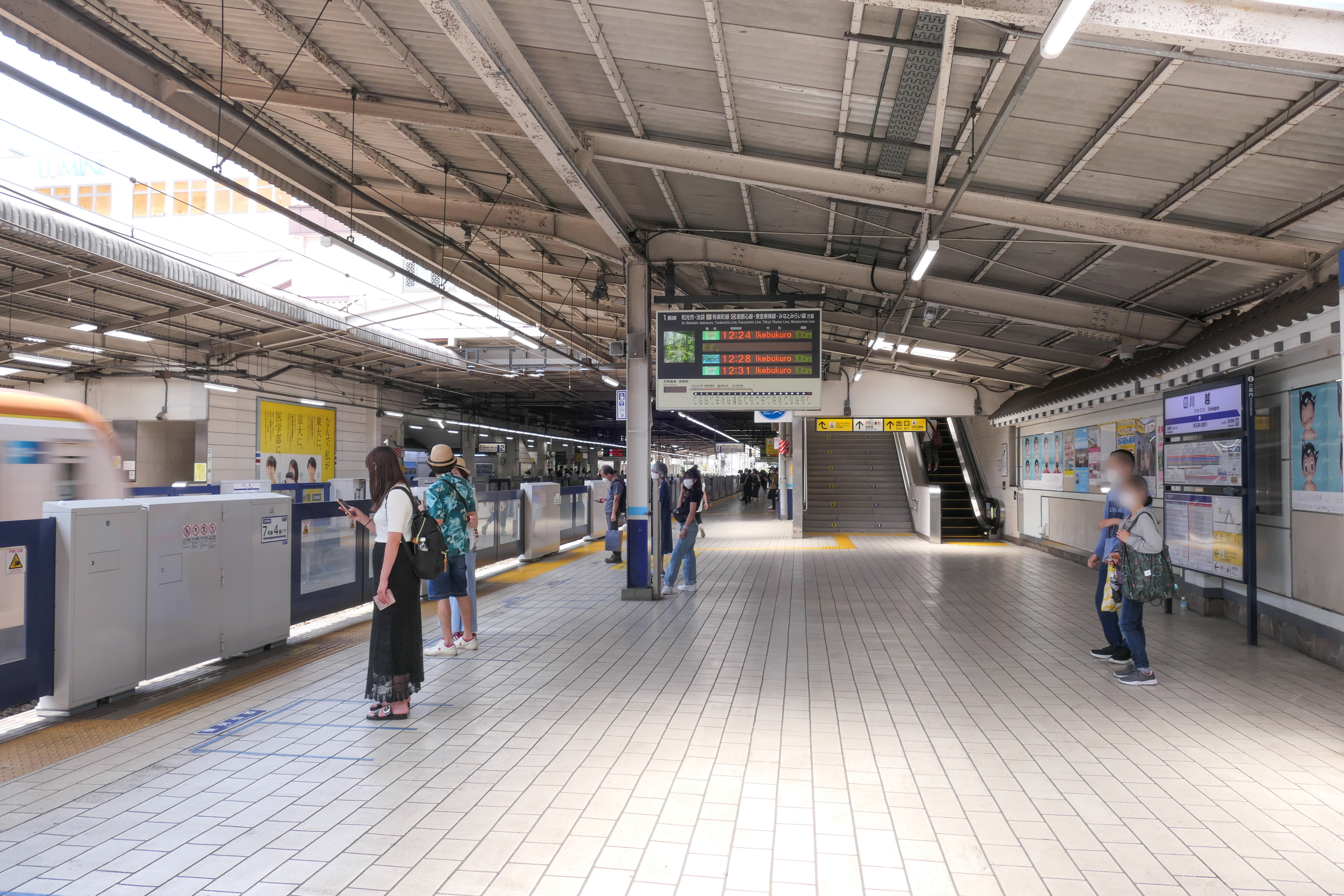
View of Tōbu Tōjō Line platform 1 in July 2021

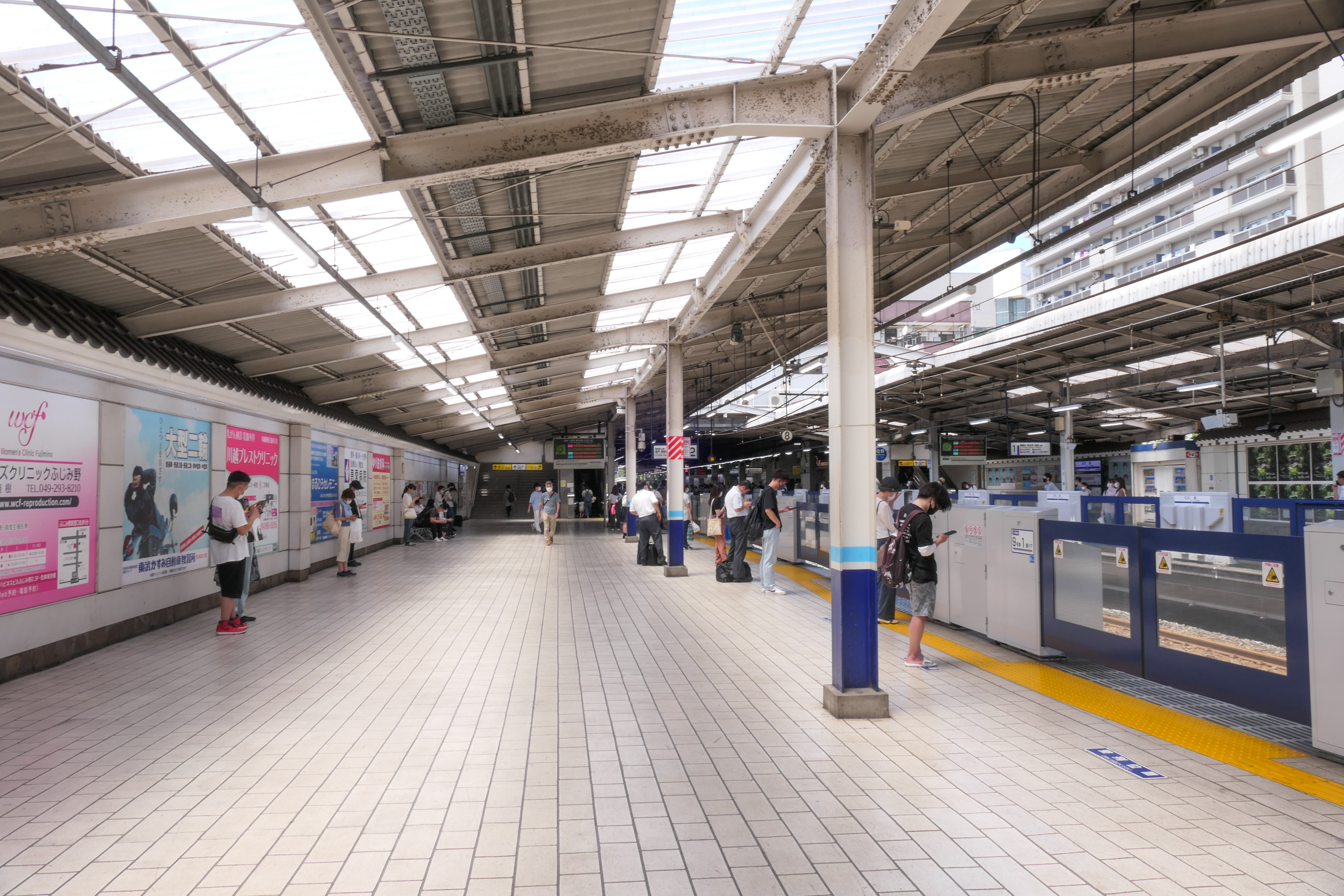
View of Tōbu Tōjō Line platform 2 in July 2021

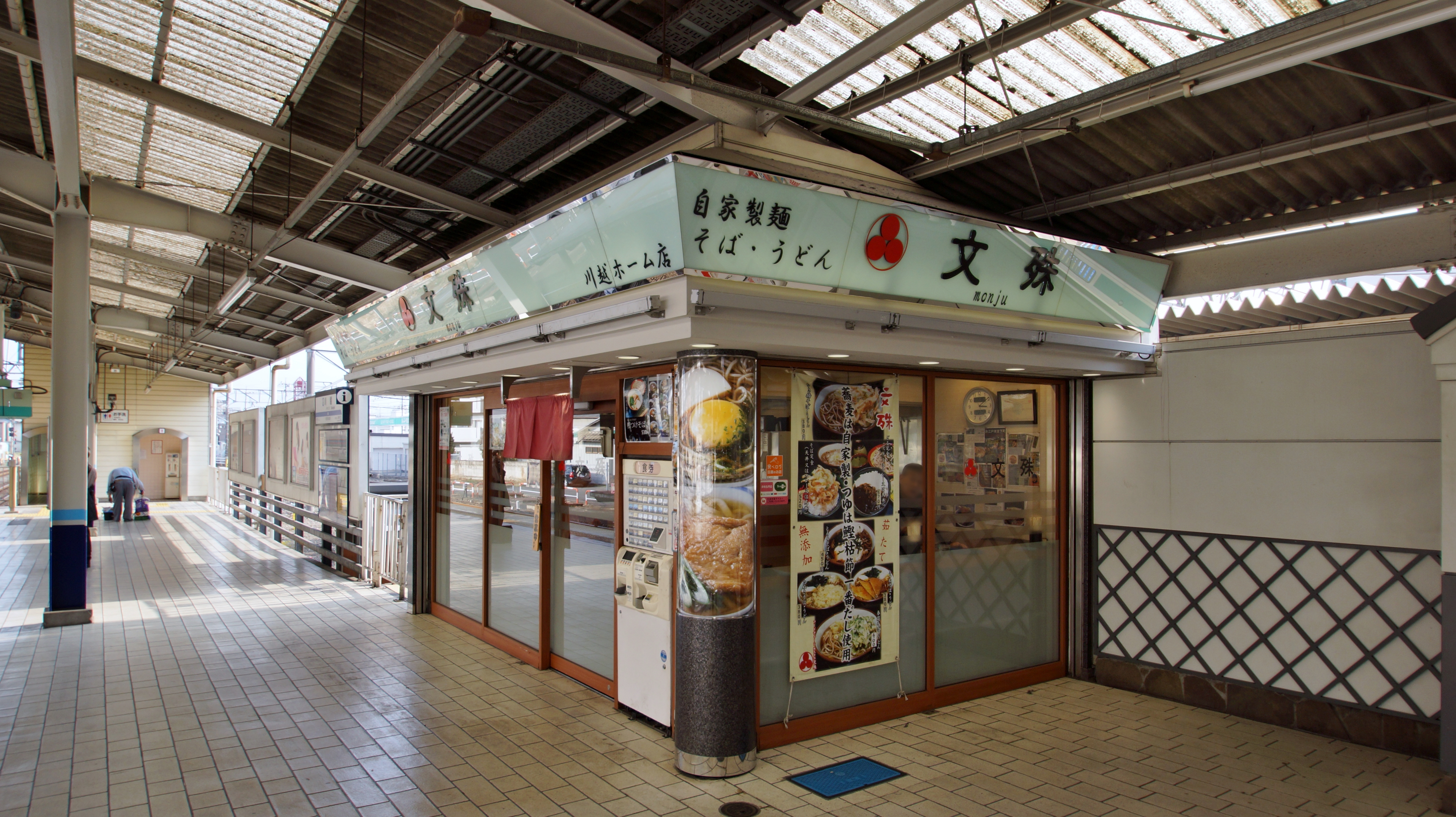
The "Monju" soba and udon noodle stand on platform 2 in February 2016

== JR East ==
Kawagoe Station 川越駅
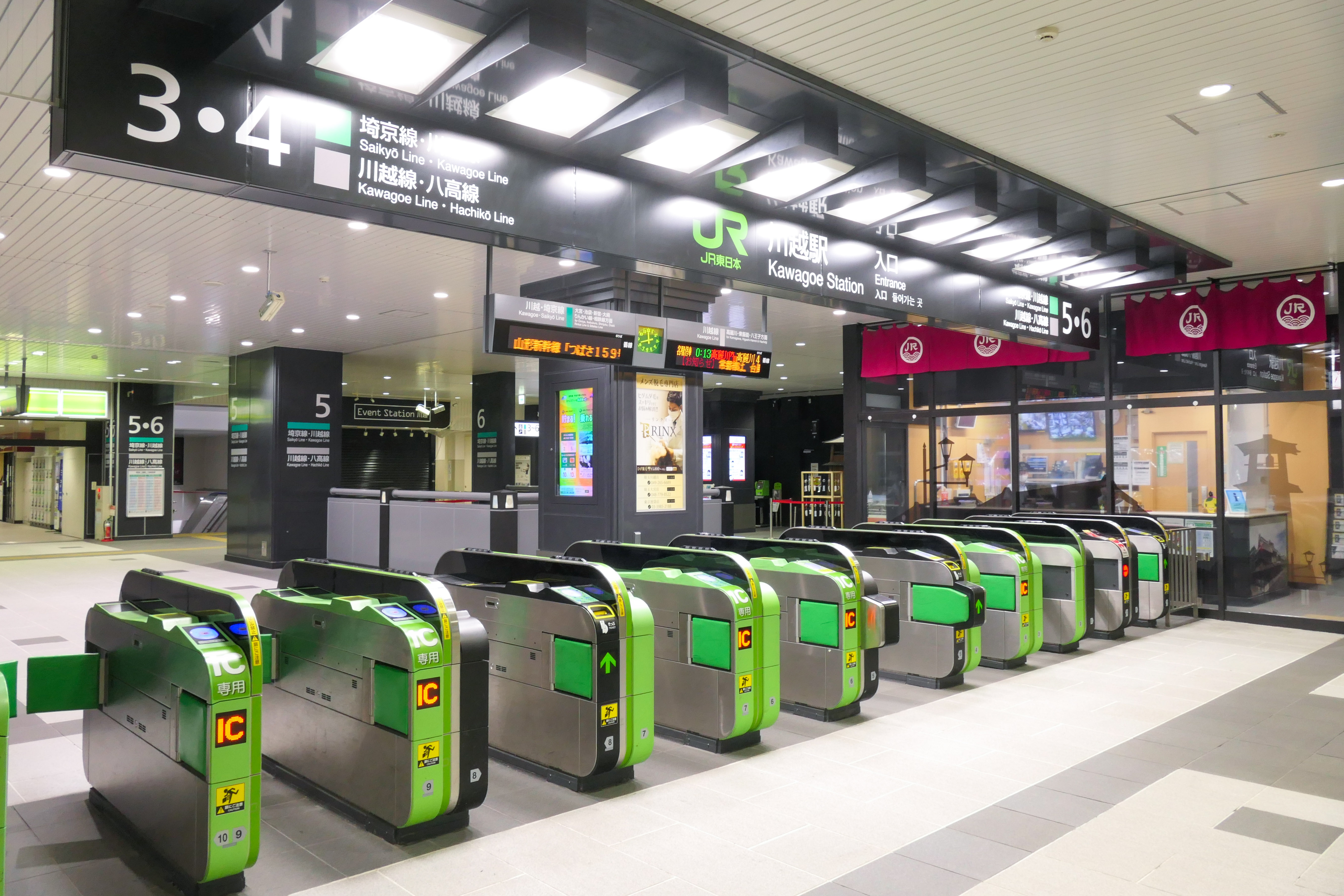
- The JR East ticket barriers in July 2021

General information
- Location: Wakita-honchō, Kawagoe-shi, Saitama-ken 350–1122; Japan
- Operator: JR East
- Line: ■ Kawagoe Line
- Platforms: 2 island platforms
- Tracks: 3

Other information
- Status: Staffed ( "Midori no Madoguchi" )
- Website: Official website

History
- Opened: 22 July 1940
- Electrified: 30 September 1985

Passengers
- FY2019: 38,112 daily

Services
Preceding station	JR East	Following station
Terminus	Kawagoe Line Commuter Rapid Rapid Local	Minami-Furuya towards Ōmiya
Nishi-Kawagoe towards Komagawa	Kawagoe Line	Terminus
Location

The station has a "Midori no Madoguchi" staffed ticket office.

=== Platforms ===
The JR East station consists of two island platforms serving three tracks. The outer platforms, 3 and 6, are generally used for services to and from Ōmiya and the Saikyō Line, while the inner platforms, 4 and 5, serving the same track, are generally used for Kawagoe Line services westward to Komagawa and Hachiōji via the Hachikō Line.

3–6	■ Kawagoe Line (for Saikyō Line via Ōmiya)	for Ōmiya; Saikyō Line for Akabane, Ikebukuro, Shinjuku and Ōsaki (via Ōmiya); Rinkai Line for Shin-Kiba (via Ōsaki)
3–6	■ Kawagoe Line (for ■ Hachiko Line via Komagawa)	for Komagawa ■ Hachiko Line for Higashi-Hanno, Haijima and Hachiōji (via Komagawa)

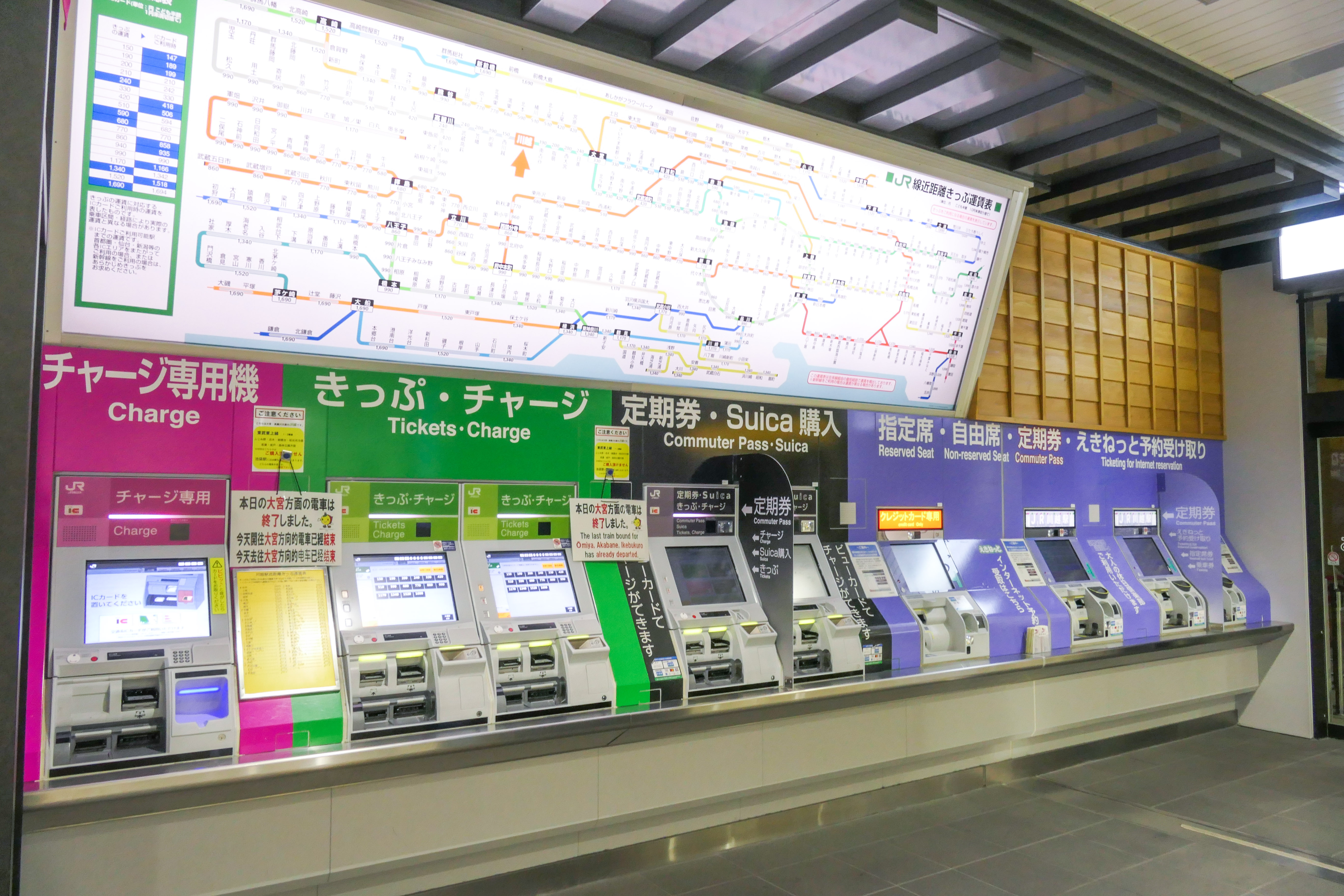
JR East ticket vending machines in July 2021

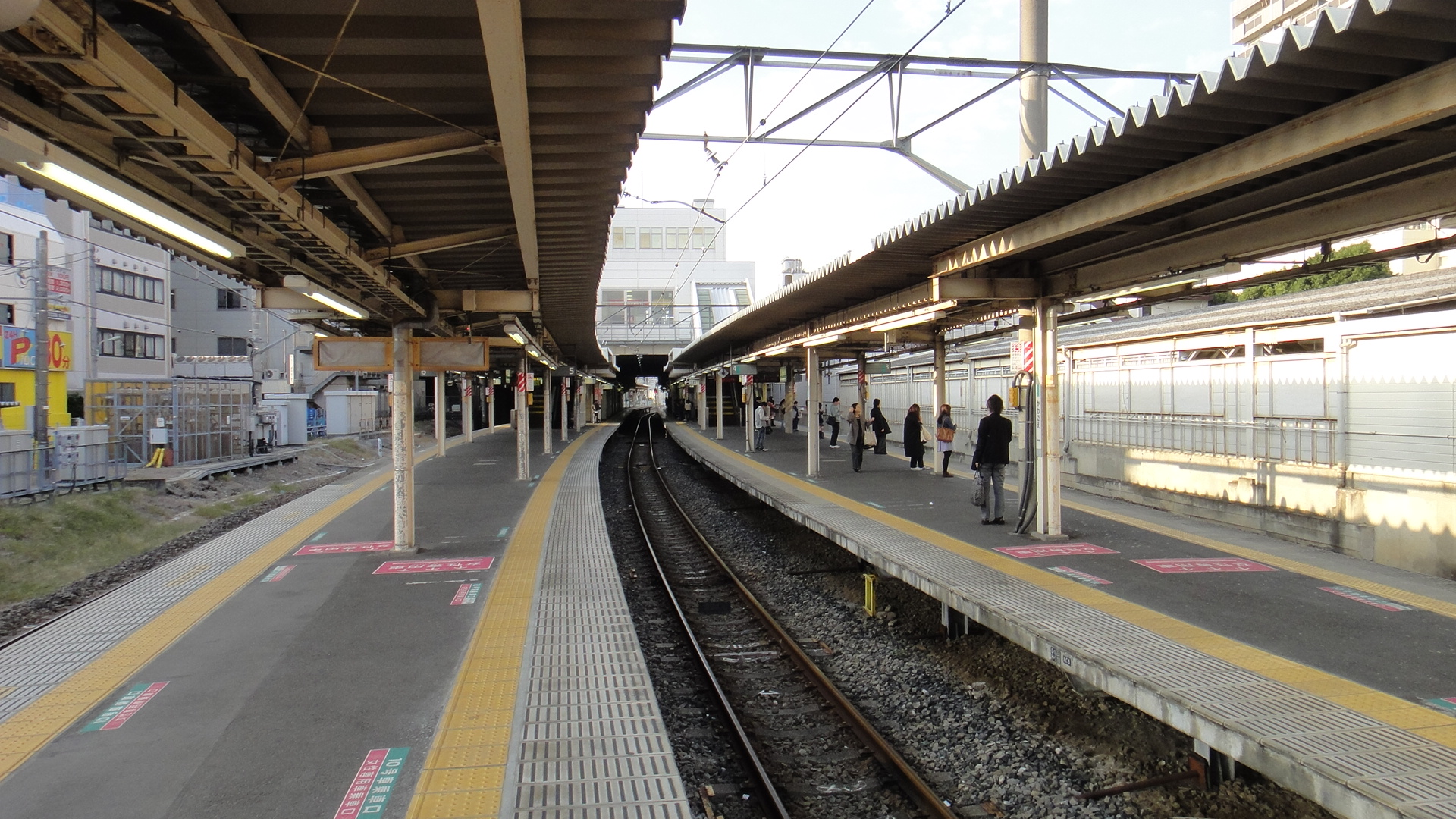
JR East platforms 5 & 6 looking northward in October 2012

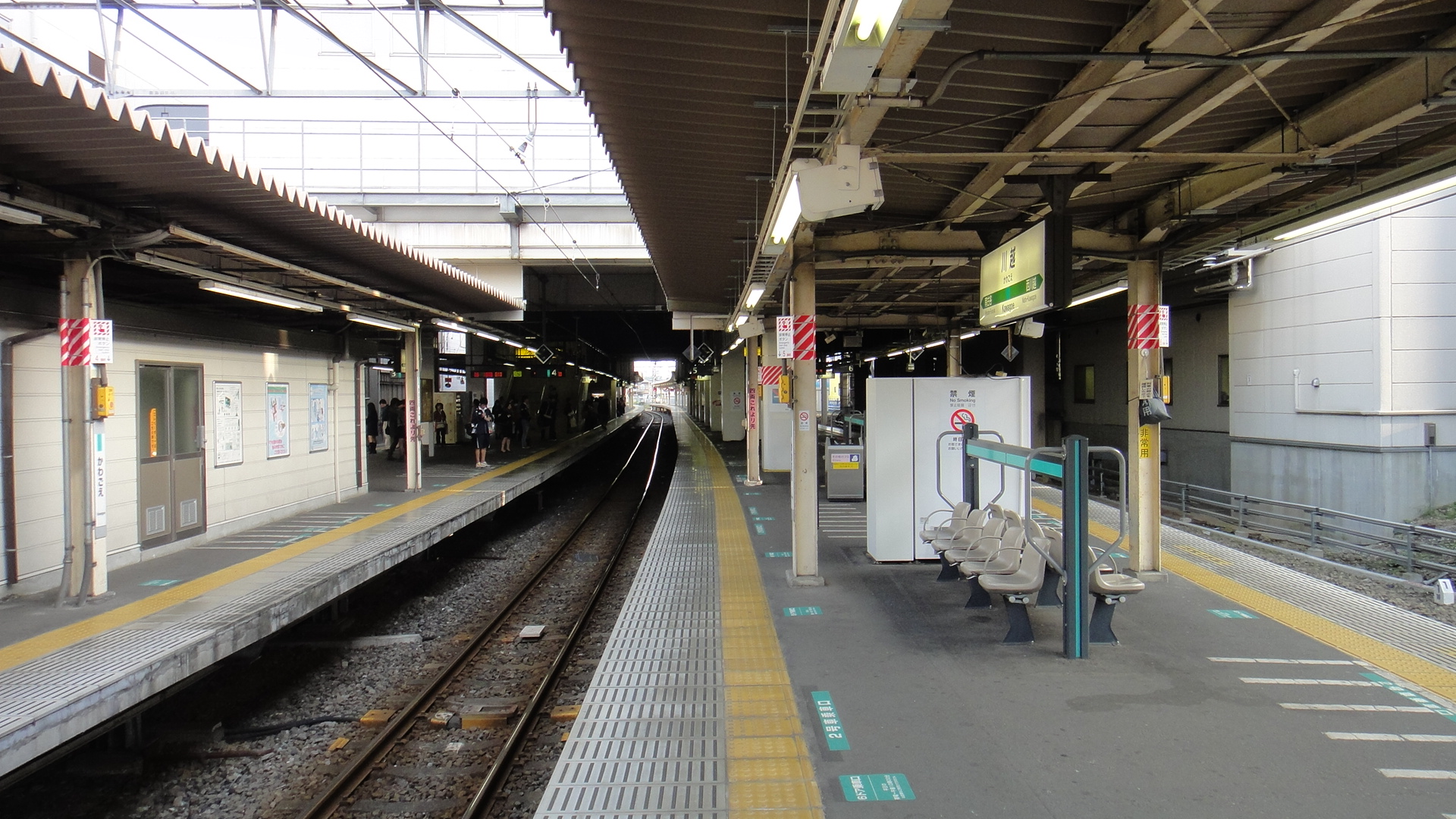
JR East platforms 5 & 6 looking southward in October 2012

== Passenger statistics ==
In fiscal 2019, the station was used by an average of 124,534 passengers daily. and the JR East station was used by an average of 38,112 passengers daily (boarding passengers only). The passenger figures for previous years are as shown below. (JR East figures are for boarding passengers only.)

Fiscal year	Tobu	JR East
2000	—N/a	35,181
2005	—N/a	36,149
2010	121,558	36,780
2011	121,051	36,344
2012	123,242	36,936
2013	127,243	37,754
2014	125,687	37,327
2015	128,021	38,343

== History ==
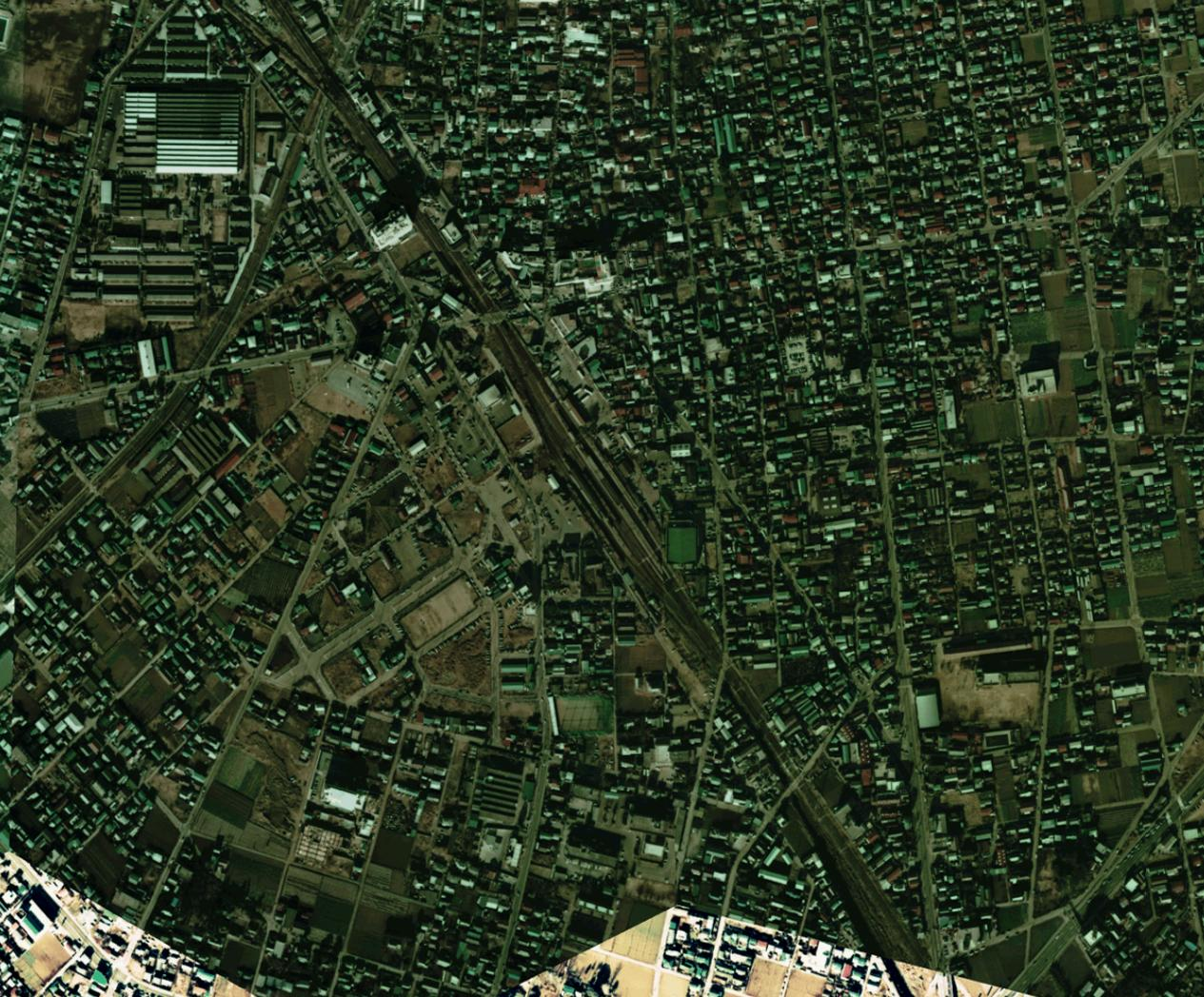
An aerial view of the station in 1974, with the alignment of the former link from the JNR tracks north of the station to the Seibu Shinjuku Line visible

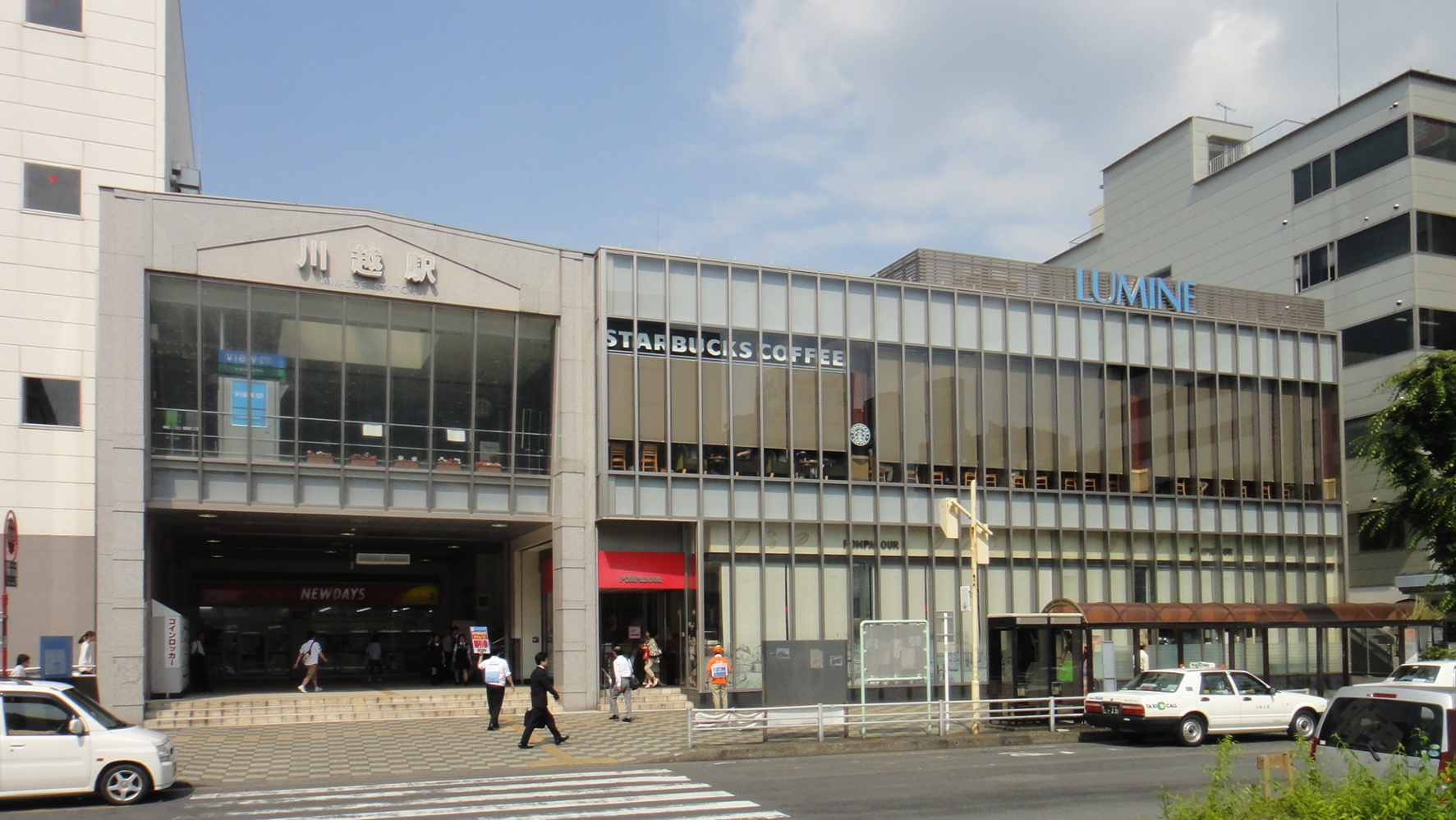
The west exit in June 2012 before remodelling

The station first opened as Kawagoe-nishimachi Station (川越西町駅) on the Tobu Railway from Ikebukuro on 1 April 1915. This was renamed Kawagoe Station on 22 July 1940 coinciding with the opening of the JNR (now JR East) station. The current elevated station building and concourse was opened in 1989. The west side of the station was enlarged in 2004 with the construction of additional sets of stairs to the JR platforms and a new Lumine building over the platforms. In 2007, the former "Fine" shopping and restaurant area within the Tobu side of the station was refurbished and reopened as "Equia Kawagoe". An additional "Equia" zone was opened above the Tobu ticket machine area in September 2008.

Through-running to and from Shibuya via the Tokyo Metro Fukutoshin Line commenced on 14 June 2008.

From 17 March 2012, station numbering was introduced on the Tobu Tojo Line, with Kawagoe Station becoming "TJ-21".

Through-running to and from Yokohama and Motomachi-Chukagai via the Tokyu Toyoko Line and Minatomirai Line commenced on 16 March 2013.

Chest-high platform edge doors were installed on the Tobu Tojo Line platforms in February 2018, and brought into use from 17 March 2018.

Through running to and from Shin-Yokohama and Shōnandai via the Tōkyū Shin-yokohama Line, Sōtetsu Shin-yokohama Line, Sōtetsu Main Line, and Sōtetsu Izumino Line commenced on 18 March 2023.

== Surrounding area ==
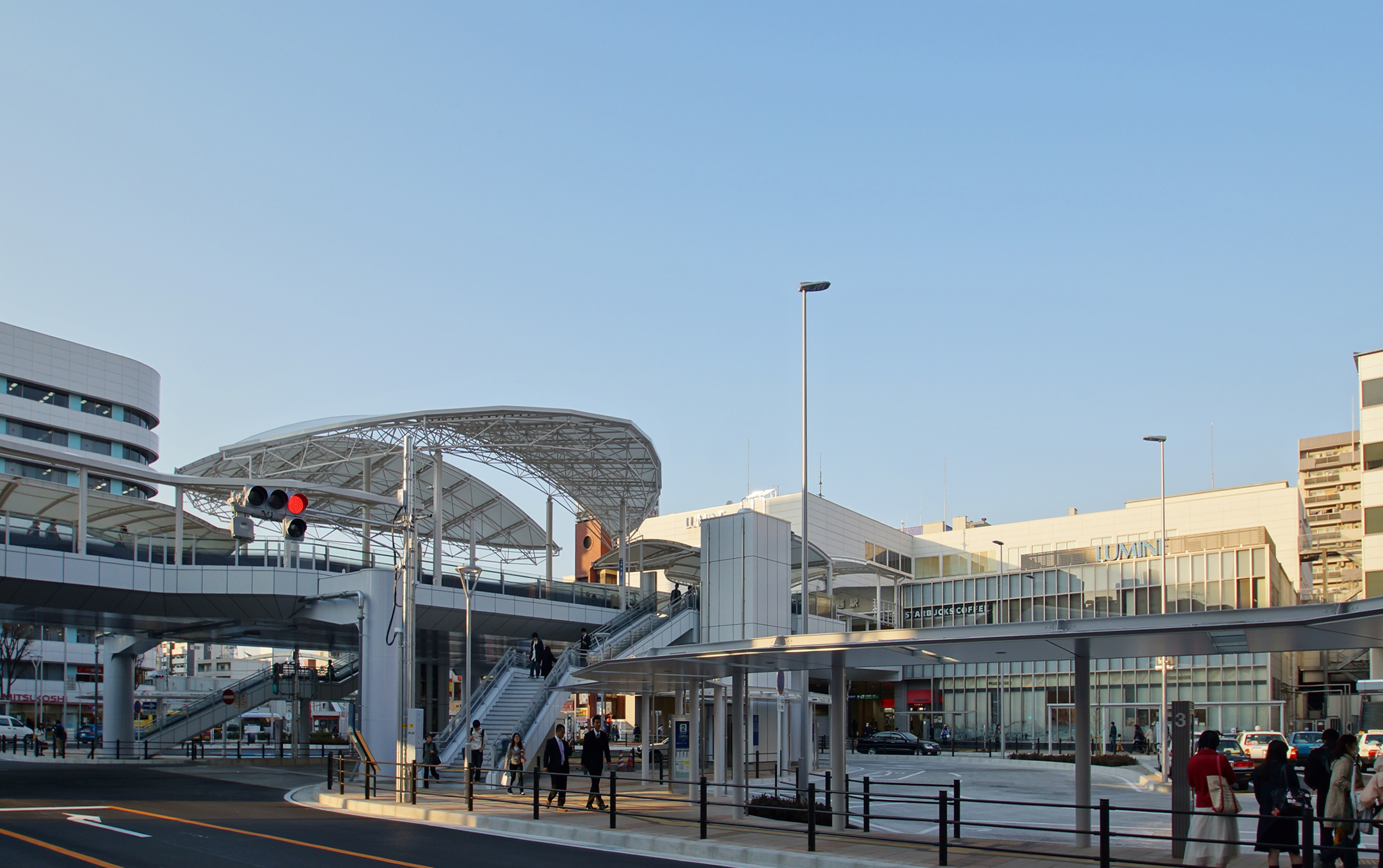
The elevated pedestrian walkway and station forecourt on the west side of the station in March 2014

- Hon-Kawagoe Station on the Seibu Shinjuku Line (approximately fifteen minutes' walk)
- Tobu Hotel
- National Route 16

From November 2012, work commenced on remodelling the west side of the station, with redesigned segregated access and parking for private cars, buses, and taxis, and an elevated pedestrian walkway leading directly from the station building. The walkway and new upper-level west entrance opened on 26 March 2014.

== Bus services ==
The following long-distance express bus services operate from the south side of the station.

- Narita Airport, operated jointly by Chiba Kōtsū, Kawagoe Motor Corp, and Tobu Bus West
- Haneda Airport, operated by Airport Transport Service (Limousine Bus) and Seibu Bus
- Tokyo Disney Resort, operated jointly by Tokyo Bay City Bus and Tobu Bus West
- Kyoto and Osaka, Wing Liner overnight service operated by Kintetsu Bus

== See also ==
- List of railway stations in Japan
