= Kawagoe, Saitama =

Kawagoe 川越市
- Core city
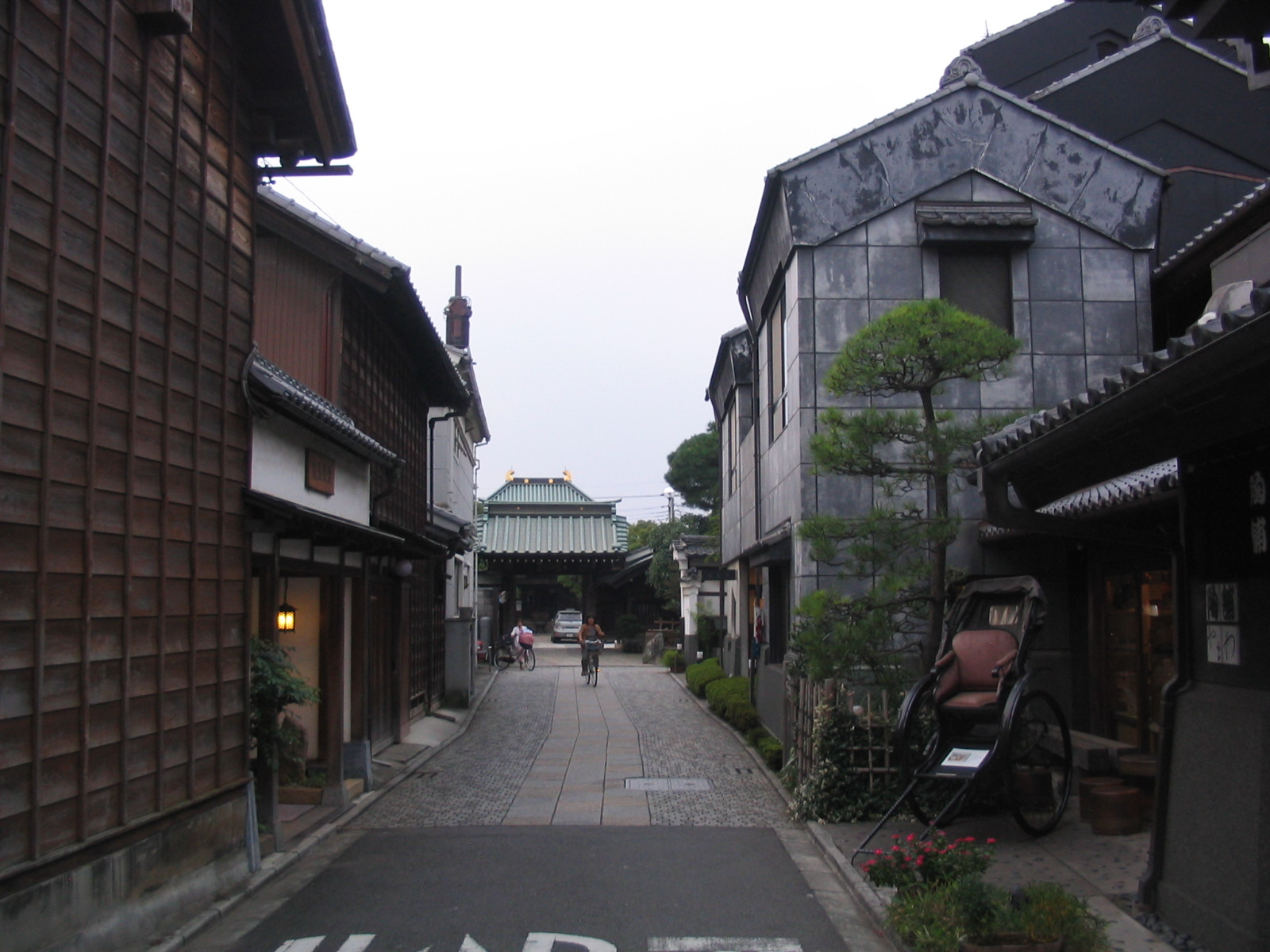
- Traditional alley in Kawagoe

- Flag Seal

- Location of Kawagoe in Saitama Prefecture

- Location within Japan
- Coordinates: 35°55′30.5″N 139°29′8.8″E
- Country: Japan
- Region: Kantō
- Prefecture: Saitama
- First official recorded: late 4th century (official)
- Town settled: April 1, 1889
- City settled: December 1, 1922

Government
  - Mayor: Yoshiaki Kawai (from February 2009)

Area
  - Total: 109.13 km^{2} (42.14 sq mi)

Population (February 2021)
  - Total: 353,214
  - Density: 3,236.6/km^{2} (8,382.8/sq mi)
- Time zone: UTC+9 (Japan Standard Time)
- Tree: Oak
- Flower: Kerria
- Bird: Goose
- Phone number: 049-224-8811
- Address: 1-3-1 Motomachi, Kawagoe-shi, Saitama-ken 350-8601
- Website: Official website

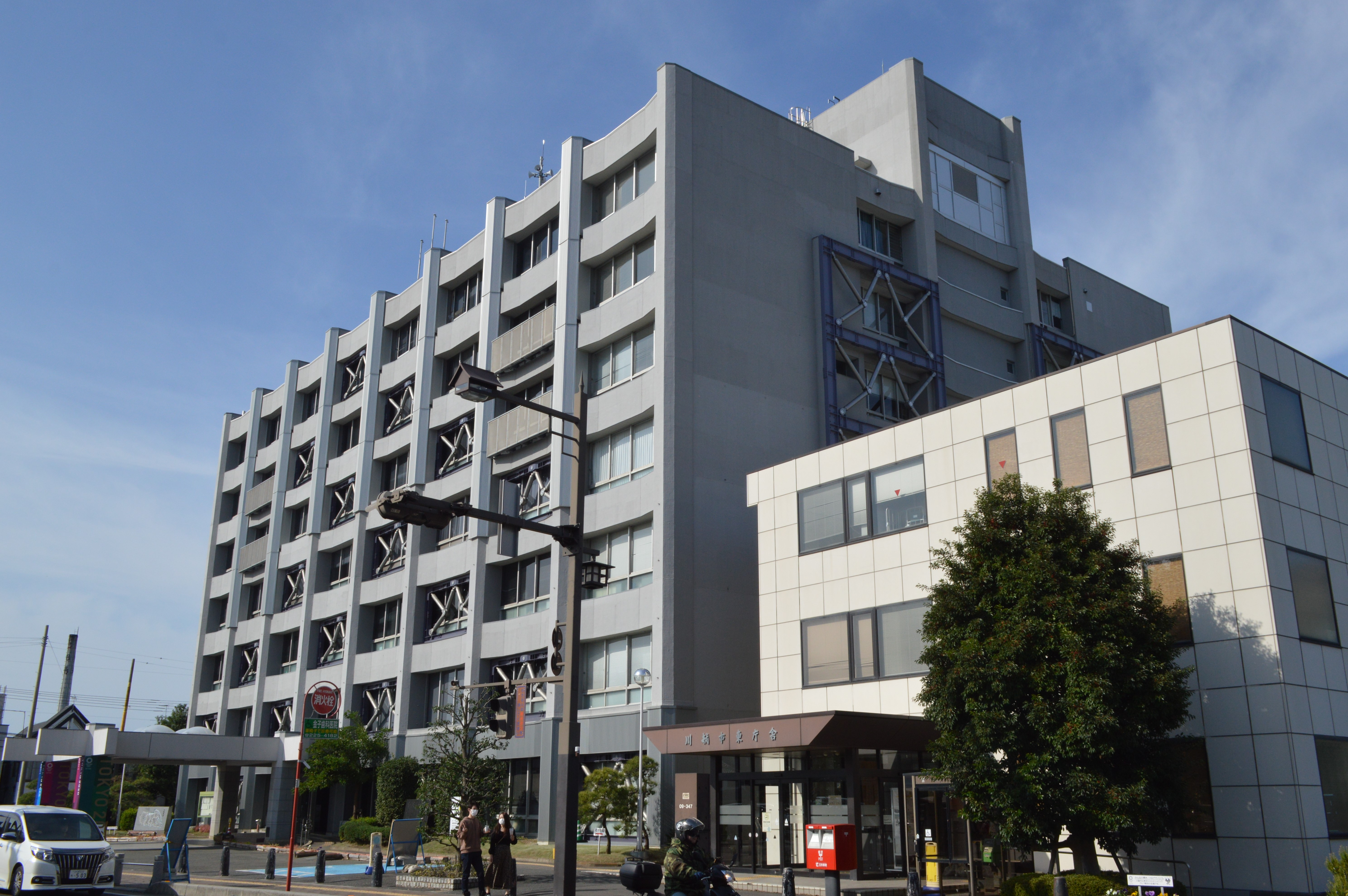
Kawagoe City Hall

Kawagoe (川越市, Kawagoe-shi) is a city in Saitama Prefecture, Japan. As of 1 February 2021, the city had an estimated population of 353,214 in 162,210 households and a population density of 3200 persons per km^{2}. The total area of the city is 109.13 square kilometres (42.14 sq mi). The city is known locally as "Little Edo" (小江戸, Koedo) after the old name for Tokyo, due to its many historic buildings.

== History ==
Kawagoe is part of ancient Musashi Province. In the medieval period, the Kawagoe area was associated with the Uesugi and Hōjō clans. Kawagoe Castle was built in 1457 by Ōta Dōshin and Ōta Dōkan on behalf of Uesugi Mochitomo, and the castle and surrounding area later came under Hōjō control. In the 1450s, Kawagoe was held by the Yamanouchi branch of the Uesugi Clan. Decades later, Hōjō Ujitsuna seized Kawagoe Castle in 1537, and the city served as an important base of operations when the Later Hōjō clan sought to gain control of the Kantō. For roughly two decades after that, the Uesugi launched a number of attempts to regain the region. This culminated in the 1545 Battle of Kawagoe, as the heavily outnumbered Hōjō garrison of Kawagoe defeated an attempted siege of Kawagoe Castle. This victory would lead to the end of Uesugi power in the region, and the near-total destruction of the clan. The Hōjō having secured themselves in the region, Kawagoe served for another forty-five years as a satellite castle town defending Edo, and the clan's central castle at Odawara. Kawagoe's location on the Arakawa River and near the Edo River were important elements of its tactical significance in defending the Kantō region from potential attacks from the north.

During the Edo period, Kawagoe Castle was the seat of the Kawagoe Domain under the Tokugawa shogunate. The castle town developed as a commercial center, with goods transported between Kawagoe and Edo via the Shingashi River. After the Meiji restoration, it briefly became capital of Kawagoe Prefecture (1871) then Iruma Prefecture (1871–1873), before becoming part of Saitama Prefecture.

The town of Kawagoe was created within Iruma District, Saitama with the establishment of the modern municipalities system on April 1, 1889. A large part of the town was destroyed in a fire on May 13, 1893 and was rebuilt with many structures using construction techniques of traditional kura warehouses. On December 1, 1922 Kawagoe merged with neighboring Senba Village, and was elevated to city status, with a population of 30,359.

The village of Tanomozawa was annexed in 1939. The city escaped World War II with only minor damage. The city expanded in 1955 by annexing the villages of Yoshino, Furuya, Minamifuruya, Takashina, Fukuhara, Daito, Kasumigaseki, Naguwashi and Yamada. In December 1999, the old core of Kawagoe was designated a Historic Preservation District. On April 1, 2003, Kawagoe was designated a core city with increased local autonomy.

== Geography ==
Located in the Musashino Terrace of central Saitama Prefecture, both the Arakawa and the Iruma Rivers flow through the city, which is approximately 30 kilometers from downtown Tokyo. The city area is approximately 16.3 km east–west and approximately 13.8 km north–south. The altitude is 18.5 meters above sea level in Motomachi, the highest at the southern end of the city is 50.7 meters, the lowest in the eastern part is 6.9 meters.

=== Surrounding municipalities ===
Saitama Prefecture

- Ageo
- Fujimino
- Fujimi
- Hidaka
- Kawajima
- Miyoshi
- Saitama (Nishi-ku)
- Sakado
- Sayama
- Tokorozawa
- Tsurugashima

=== Climate ===
Kawagoe has a humid subtropical climate (Köppen Cfa) characterized by warm summers and cool winters with light to no snowfall. The average annual temperature in Kawagoe is 14.2 °C. The average annual rainfall is 1448 mm with September as the wettest month. The temperatures are highest on average in August, at around 26.0 °C, and lowest in January, at around 2.5 °C.

== Demographics ==
Per Japanese census data, the population of Kawagoe has increased steadily over the past century.

Historical population
Year	Pop.	±%
1920	66,320	—
1930	75,690	+14.1%
1940	77,672	+2.6%
1950	100,407	+29.3%
1960	107,523	+7.1%
1970	171,029	+59.1%
1980	259,314	+51.6%
1990	304,852	+17.6%
2000	330,766	+8.5%
2010	342,670	+3.6%
2020	354,571	+3.5%

== Government ==
Kawagoe has a mayor-council form of government with a directly elected mayor and a unicameral city council of 36 members. Kawagoe contributes four members to the Saitama Prefectural Assembly. In terms of national politics, the city is part of Saitama 7th district of the lower house of the Diet of Japan.

=== List of Kawagoe mayors (from 1922) ===
	Mayor	Term start	Term end
1	Riuemon Ayabe (綾部 利右ヱ門)	1 December 1922	February 1923
2	Kumazo Takeda (武田 熊蔵)	1 August 1923	31 July 1927
3	Kikuro Terao (寺尾 規矩郎)	22 September 1927	21 September 1931
4	Hisao Hayashi (林 寿夫)	13 October 1931	15 January 1932
5	Kinjyuro Hayakawa (早川 金十郎)	i March 1932	12 August 1935
6	Sadagoro Hashimoto (橋本 定五郎)	17 August 1935	16 August 1939
7	Tokujiro Date (伊達 徳次郎)	24 August 1939	23 August 1943

	Mayor	Term start	Term end
8	Kaiichi Shibuya (渋谷 塊一)	14 September 1943	15 March 1945
9	Masaumi Kawai (河合 正臣)	21 April 1945	16 August 1946
10	Taikichi Itoh (伊藤 泰吉)	7 October 1946	31 July 1965
11	Takiji Kato (加藤 瀧二)	19 September 1965	7 February 1981
12	Kiichi Kawai (川合 喜一)	8 February 1981	7 February 1993
13	Koichi Funahashi (舟橋 功一)	8 February 1993	7 February 2009
14	Yoshiaki Kawai (川合 善明)	8 February 2009	Incumbent

== Education ==
=== Universities and colleges ===
- Toyo University - Kawagoe campus
- Tokyo International University
- Toho College of Music
- Shobi University
- Saitama Medical University – Kawagoe campus

=== Primary and secondary education ===
Kawagoe has 32 public elementary schools and 22 public middle schools operated by the city government, and one private elementary school and four private combined middle/high schools. The city has seven public high schools operated by the Saitama Board of Education, one by the Kawagoe city government and three private high schools. The prefecture also operates three special education schools for the handicapped.

== Transportation ==
=== Railway ===
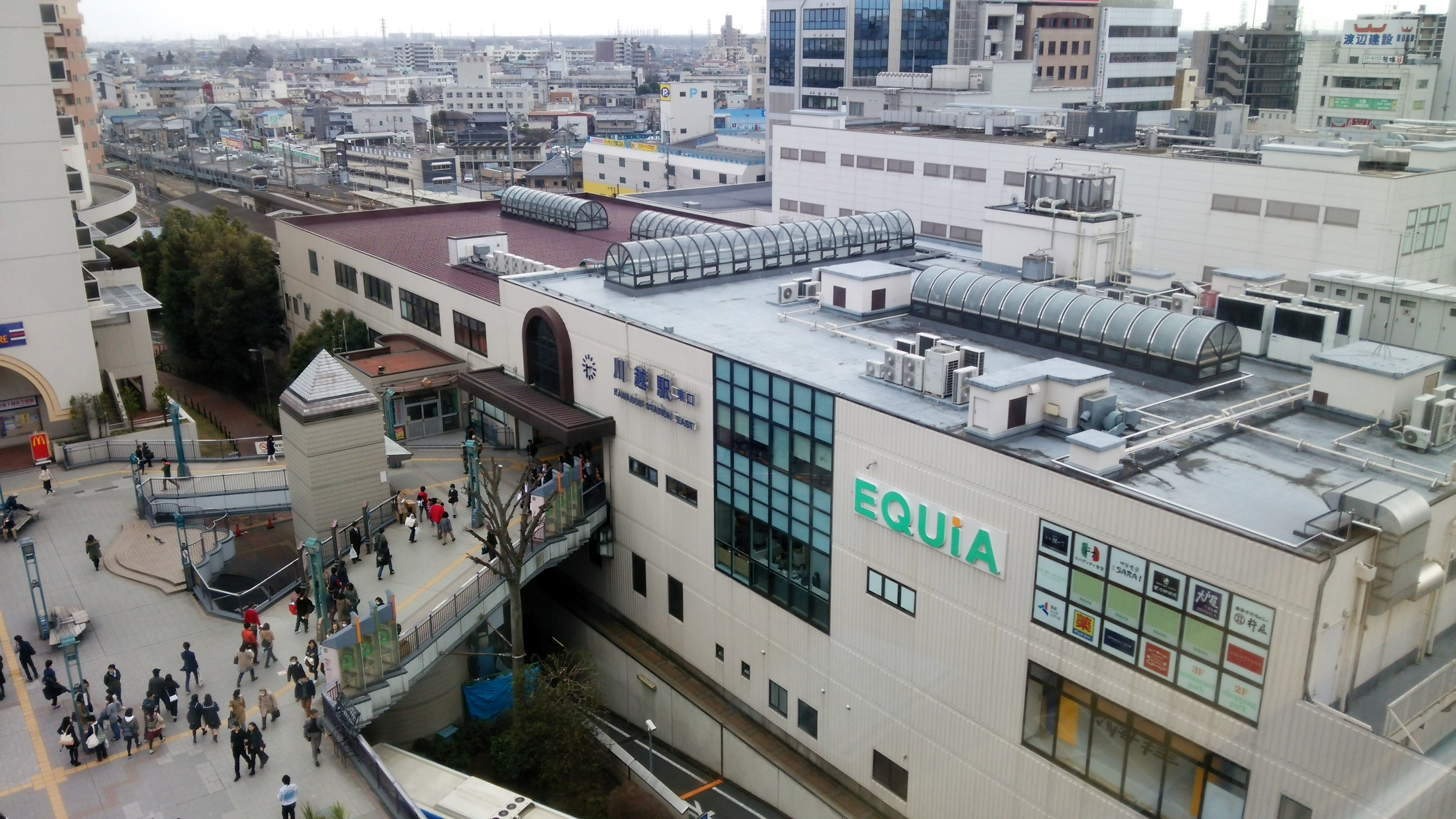
Kawagoe Station in March 2016

JR East – Kawagoe Line

- Matoba - Nishi-Kawagoe - Kawagoe - Minami-Furuya

Tōbu Railway - Tōbu Tōjō Line

- Kasumigaseki - Kawagoeshi - Kawagoe - Shingashi

Seibu Railway - Seibu Shinjuku Line

- Hon-Kawagoe - Minami-Otsuka

=== Highway ===
- Kan-etsu Expressway
- Ken-Ō Expressway
- National Route 16
- National Route 254
- National Route 407

=== Cycling ===
The city of Kawagoe operates a bicycle sharing scheme in the city centre, with eight pickup/parking locations.

== Sister cities ==
Kawagoe is twinned with the following six municipalities in Japan and worldwide.

=== Japan ===
- (Japan) Nakasatsunai, Hokkaido, since November 2002
- (Japan) Obama, Fukui, since November 1982
- (Japan) Tanagura, Fukushima, since January 1972

=== International ===
- Autun, France, since October 2002
- Offenbach am Main, Germany, since August 1983
- Salem, Oregon, United States, since August 1986
- Jacareí, São Paulo (state), Brazil, since August 1977

== Local attractions ==
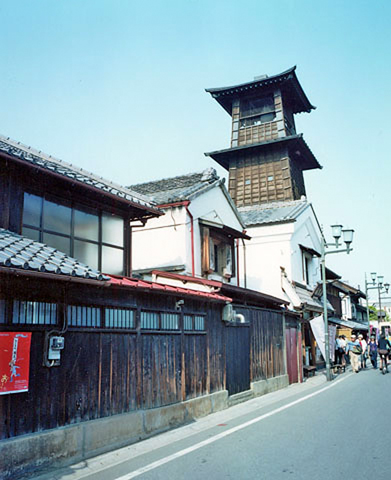
Kawagoe Bell Tower

Kawagoe is famous for its sweet potatoes, and the local "Candy Street" sells such treats as sweet potato chips, sweet potato ice cream, sweet potato coffee, and even sweet potato beer, brewed at the local Coedo Brewery. Some of its streets preserve the old castle town of the Edo period (17th to 19th centuries).

=== Sights ===
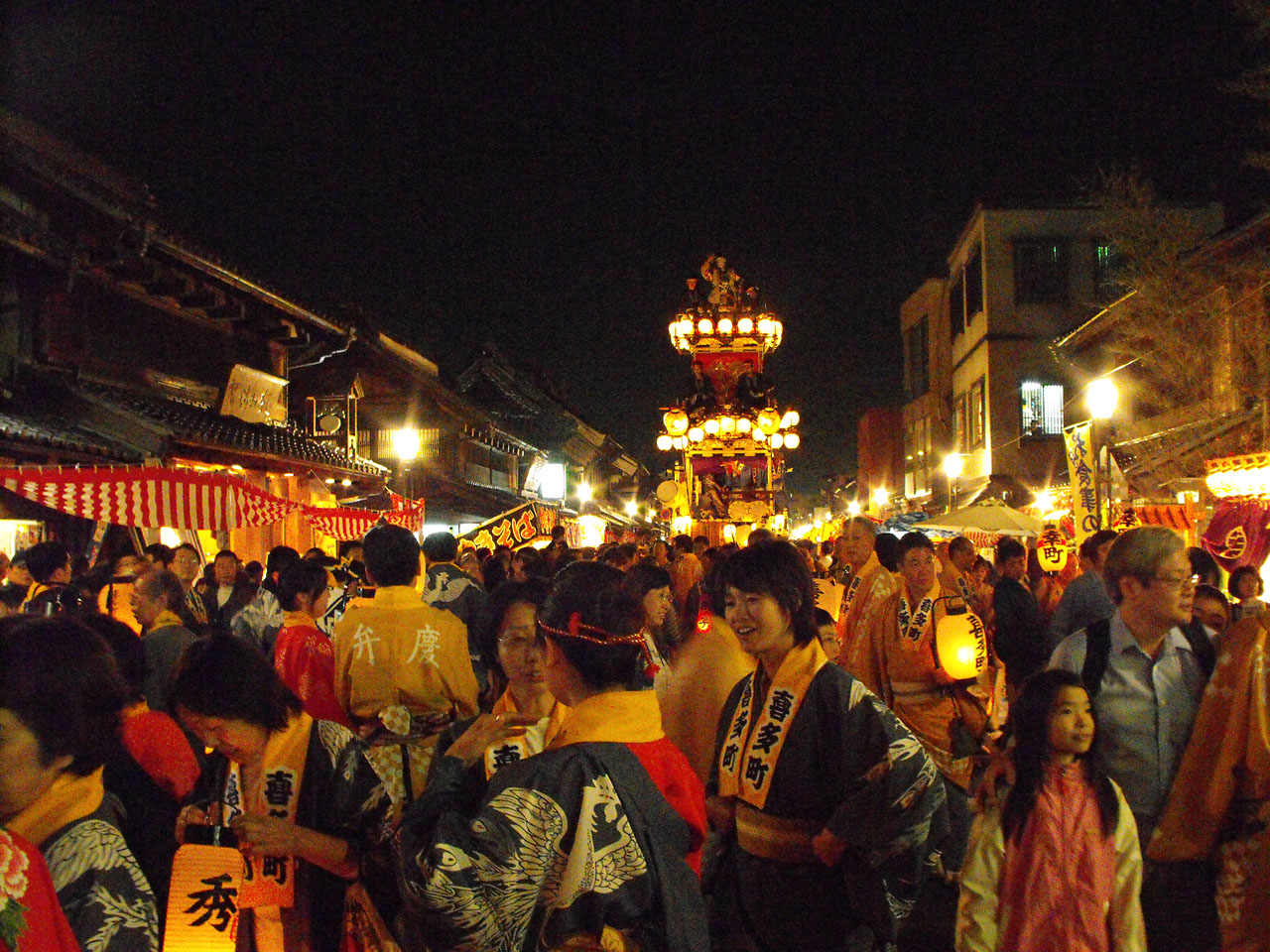
Kawagoe Festival

- Bell of Time (時の鐘, Toki no kane) is a bell tower originally built on the orders of Sakai Tadakatsu (酒井 忠勝) between 1624 and 1644. The present structure goes back to 1894, a year after the Great Fire of Kawagoe. It is a three-story tower measuring 16 meters in height. The tower has been telling time to the city's residents for 350 years and has been deemed as a symbol of the city. Currently, the bell can be heard four times a day (6 AM, 12 PM, 3 PM and 6 PM)
- Confectionery Row (菓子屋横丁, Kashiya Yokochō) is a small backstreet alley where a dozen stores sell old-fashioned cheap sweets and snacks, most of which are priced at less than 50 yen. The location was known as a neighborhood where scores of confectionery manufactures lined the alley. Many tourists come here to enjoy the nostalgic atmosphere of the early Shōwa period. Meibutsu of Confectionary Row include fukashi, a stick of wheat bran covered in brown sugar, and amezaiku.
- Kurazukuri Street (蔵造りの町並み, Kurazukuri no machinami) is lined with traditional warehouses constructed in a style called kurazukuri (蔵造り) and maintains the style of the Edo period. The city of Kawagoe started building kurazukuri-style warehouses in the aftermath of a great fire that consumed one-third of the old Kawagoe in 1893. The style was designed to be fireproof. Within and beyond the Kurazukuri Street, many warehouses from the 18th and 19th centuries can still be seen. The Kawagoe Kurazukuri Museum is located in a traditional warehouse built in 1893 and allows its visitors to walk around inside and experience the life of Edo merchants. The artisan shops in the area include Machikan, a sword and knife manufacturer in operation for generations.

=== Festivals ===
Kawagoe Festival is held every year on the third Saturday and Sunday of October. In 2016, it was designated as an "Intangible cultural heritage".

== Notable people ==
- Hisako Higuchi, professional golfer
- Masachika Ichimura, actor
- Ayaka Miyoshi, J-Pop idol and actress
- Asada Nobuoki, General in the Imperial Japanese Army
- Asahi Sasaki, football player
- Nobutaka Shiōden, General in the Imperial Japanese Army
- Yuzuho Shiokoshi, football player
- Nanaka Suwa, voice actress
- Sho Tsuboi, racing driver
