= Shimo Station =

Metro station in Tokyo, Japan

Coordinates: 35.777921°N 139.732594°E

Shimo Station 志茂駅

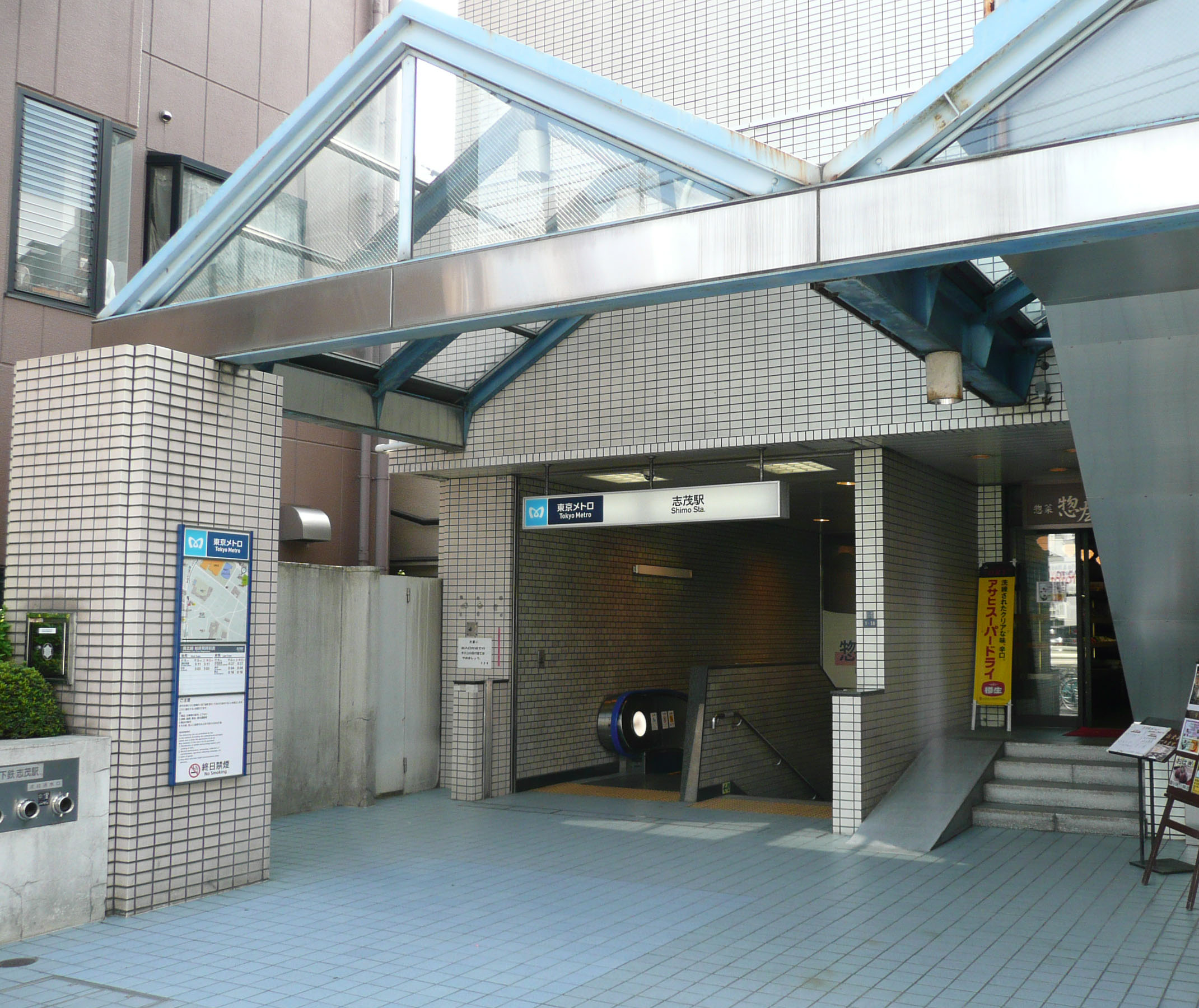
- Shimo Station

General information
- Location: 2-1-18 Shimo, Kita, Tokyo （東京都北区志茂2-1-18） Japan
- Operator: Tokyo Metro
- Line: Namboku Line
- Platforms: 1 island platform
- Tracks: 2

Construction
- Structure type: Underground

Other information
- Station code: N-18

History
- Opened: 29 November 1991; 34 years ago

Passengers
- FY2019: 13,794 daily

Services
Preceding station	Tokyo Metro	Following station
Oji-kamiya towards Meguro	Namboku Line	Akabane-iwabuchi Terminus
Location
- Location within Special wards of Tokyo Location within Tokyo Bay and Bōsō Peninsula Location within Tokyo Location within Japan

Shimo Station (志茂駅, Shimo-eki) is a subway station on the Tokyo Metro Namboku Line in Kita, Tokyo, Japan, operated by Tokyo Metro.

== Lines ==
Shimo Station is served by the Tokyo Metro Namboku Line and is numbered N-18. It lies 20.1 km from the starting point of the Namboku Line at Meguro.

== Station layout ==
The station consists of a single underground island platform on the second basement level, serving two tracks.

=== Platforms ===
1
Namboku Line
for Akabane-iwabuchi
Saitama Rapid Railway Line for Urawa-misono
2
- for Meguro
- Meguro Line for Hiyoshi
- Tokyu Shin-Yokohama Line for Shin-Yokohama Station
- Sotetsu Main Line for Ebina via the Tokyu/Sotetsu Shin-Yokohama Line

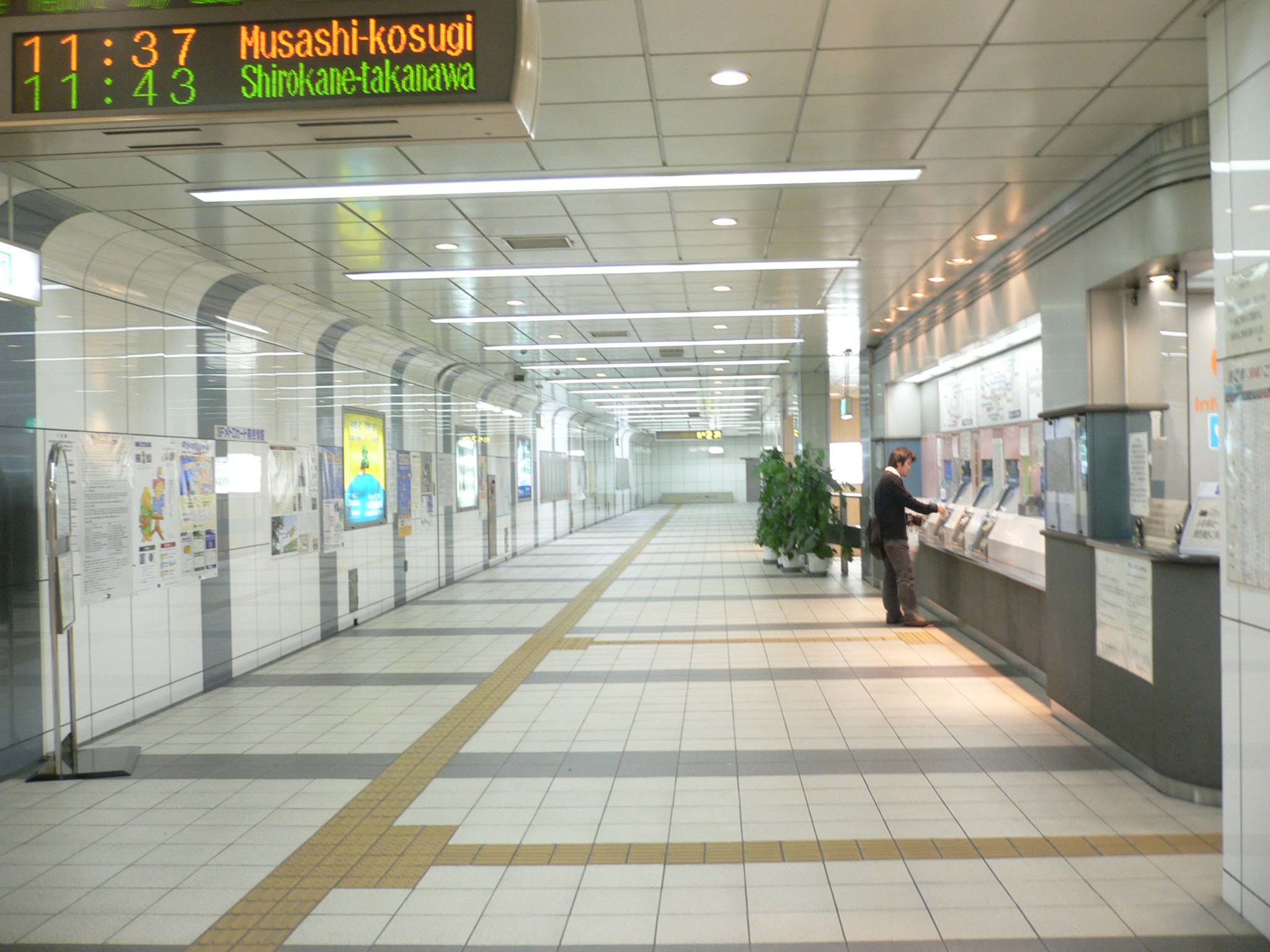
Station interior

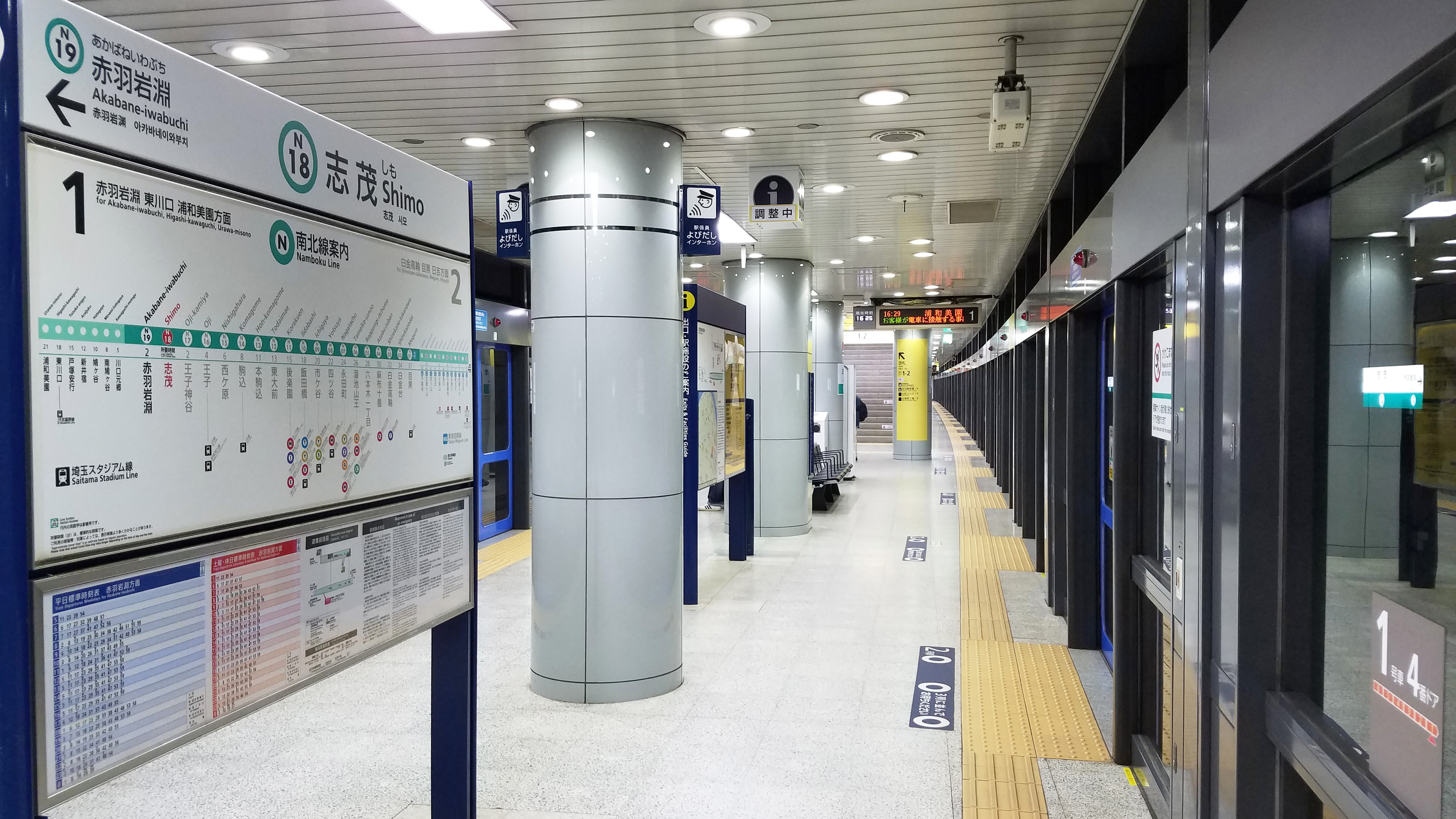
Platform in December 2017

== History ==
Shimo Station opened on 29 November 1991.

The station facilities were inherited by Tokyo Metro after the privatization of the Teito Rapid Transit Authority (TRTA) in 2004.

== Surrounding area ==
- National Route 122
- Nadeshiko Elementary School

== Passenger statistics ==
In fiscal 2019, the station was the third-least used on the Tokyo Metro network with an average of 13,794 passengers daily.

The passenger statistics for previous years are as shown below.

Fiscal year	Daily average
2011	9,905
2012	10,130
2013	10,859
