= Kawaguchi Station =

Railway station in Kawaguchi, Saitama Prefecture, Japan

JK39 Kawaguchi Station 川口駅
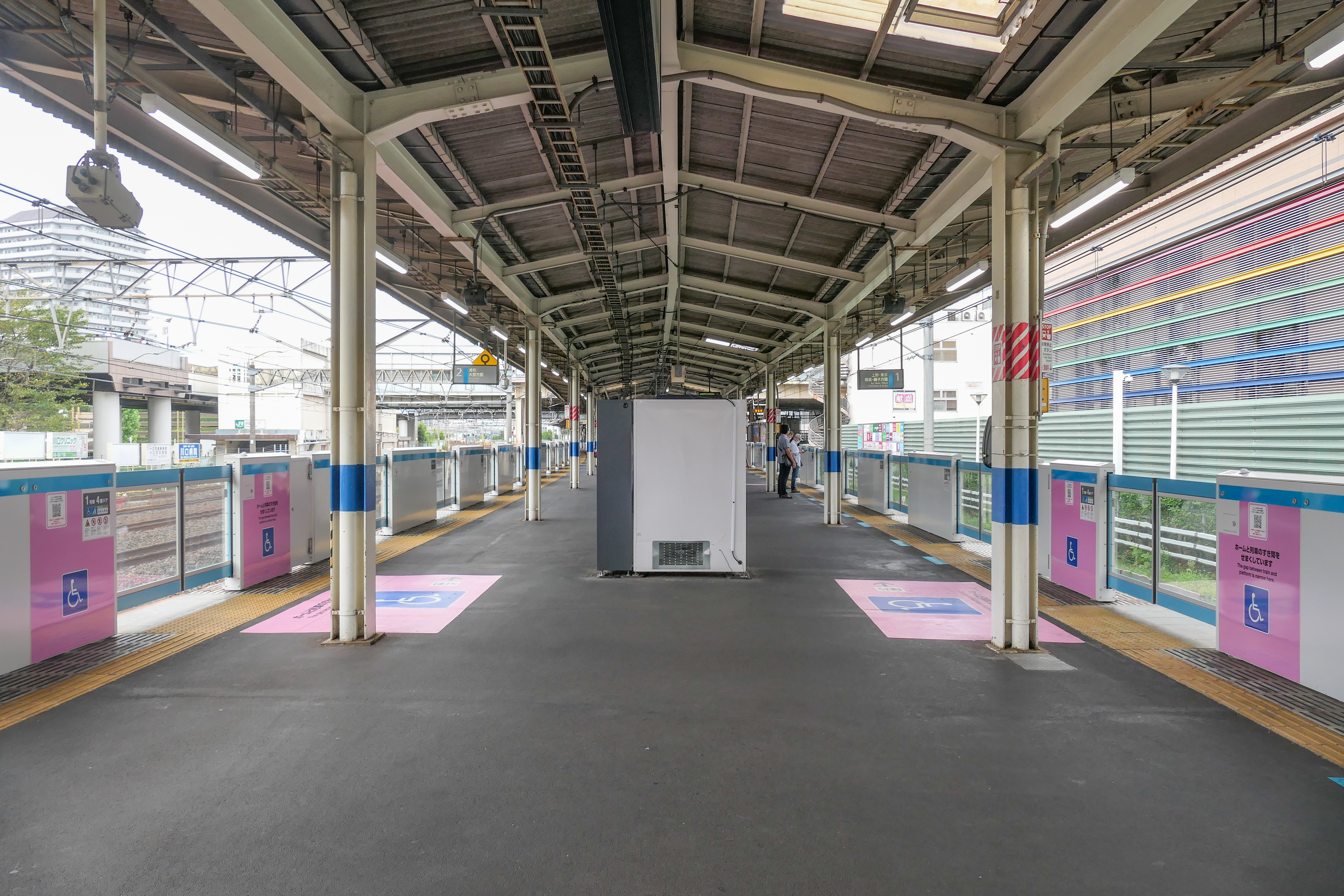

General information
- Location: 3 Sakaechō, Kawaguchi-shi, Saitama-ken 332-0017; Japan
- Coordinates: 35°48′07″N 139°43′03″E
- Operator: JR East
- Line: Keihin-Tōhoku Line
- Distance: 15.8 km from Tokyo
- Platforms: 1 island platform
- Connections: Bus terminal

Other information
- Status: Staffed ( Midori no Madoguchi )
- Website: Official website

History
- Opened: 10 September 1910

Passengers
- FY2019: 84,197

Services
Preceding station	JR East	Following station
Akabane JK38 towards Yokohama	Keihin–Tōhoku Line Rapid Local	Nishi-Kawaguchi JK40 towards Ōmiya
Location
- Location within Saitama Prefecture Location within Japan

Kawaguchi Station (川口駅, Kawaguchi-eki) is a passenger railway station located in the city of Kawaguchi, Saitama, Japan, operated by East Japan Railway Company (JR East).

== Lines ==
Kawaguchi Station is served by the Keihin-Tōhoku Line, from Ōmiya in Saitama Prefecture to Isogo in Kanagawa Prefecture. It is located 14.5 kilometers from Ōmiya and 15.8 kilometers from Tokyo.

== Station layout ==
The station has one island platform, serving two tracks, with an elevated station building. It has a Midori no Madoguchi staffed ticket office and also a View Plaza travel agency.

=== Platforms ===
1	Keihin-Tohoku Line	for Ueno, Tokyo, Shinagawa, Yokohama, and Negishi Line for Ōfuna
2	Keihin-Tohoku Line	for Urawa and Ōmiya

== History ==
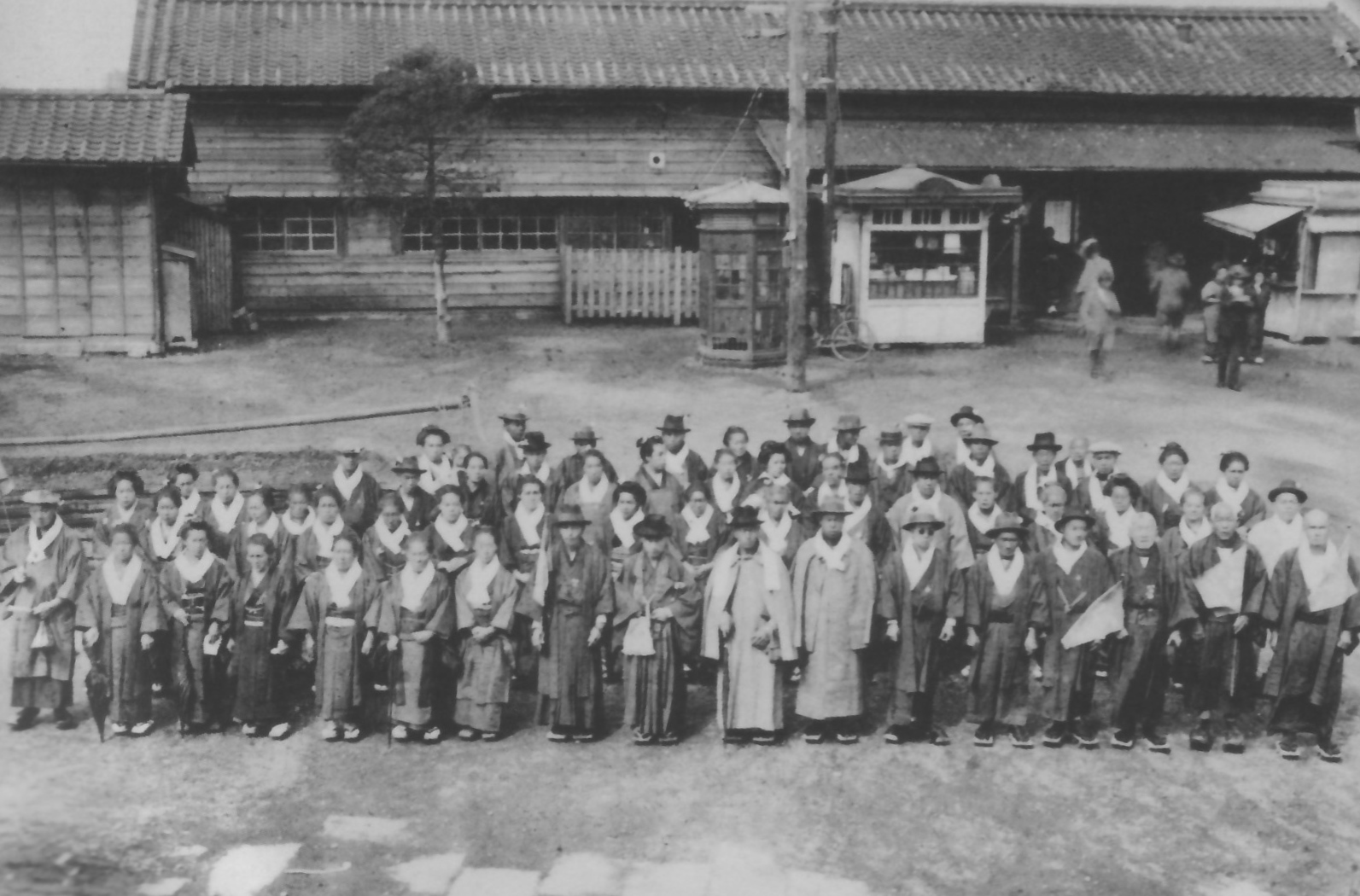
Kawaguchi Station in the early 20th century

The station opened on 10 September 1910.

== Passenger statistics ==
In the 2015 data available from Japan’s Ministry of Land, Infrastructure, Transport and Tourism, Kawaguchi → Akabane was one of the train segments among Tokyo's most crowded train lines during rush hour.

In fiscal 2019, the station was used by an average of 84,197 passengers daily (boarding passengers only). The daily average passenger figures (boarding passengers only) in previous years are as shown below.

Fiscal year	Daily average
2000	78,675
2005	76,610
2010	78,759
2015	82,325

== Surrounding area ==
=== East side ===
- Kawaguchi City Office
- Kawaguchi Shrine
- Kawaguchi Municipal Medical Center
- Kawaguchi Motogō Station (Saitama Rapid Railway Line)
- Kawaguchi High School
- Kawaguchi Municipal Kawaguchi Sogo High School
- Ario Kawaguchi shopping centre
- Atlia municipal art gallery

=== West side ===
- Kawaguchi Nishi Park
- Saiseikai Kawaguchi General Hospital

== See also ==
- List of railway stations in Japan
