= Hatogaya Station =

Railway station in Kawaguchi, Saitama Prefecture, Japan

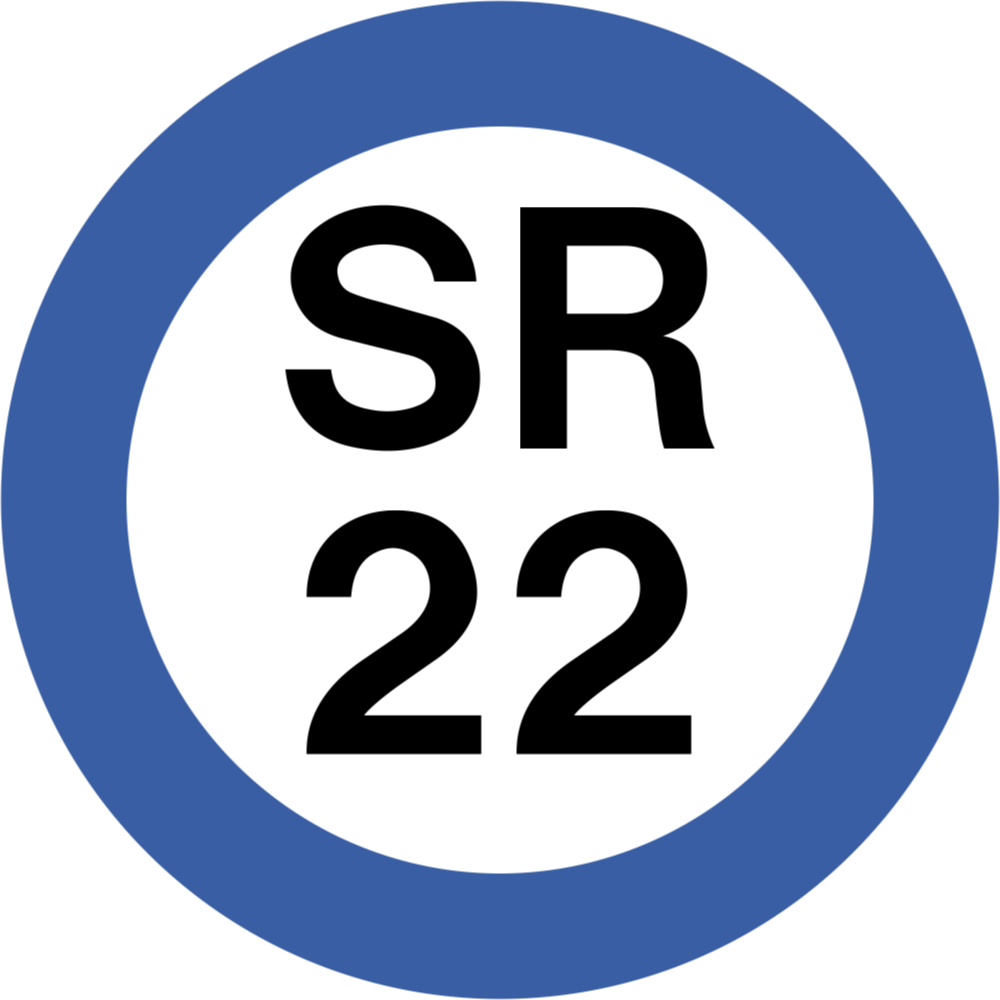
Hatogaya Station 鳩ヶ谷駅

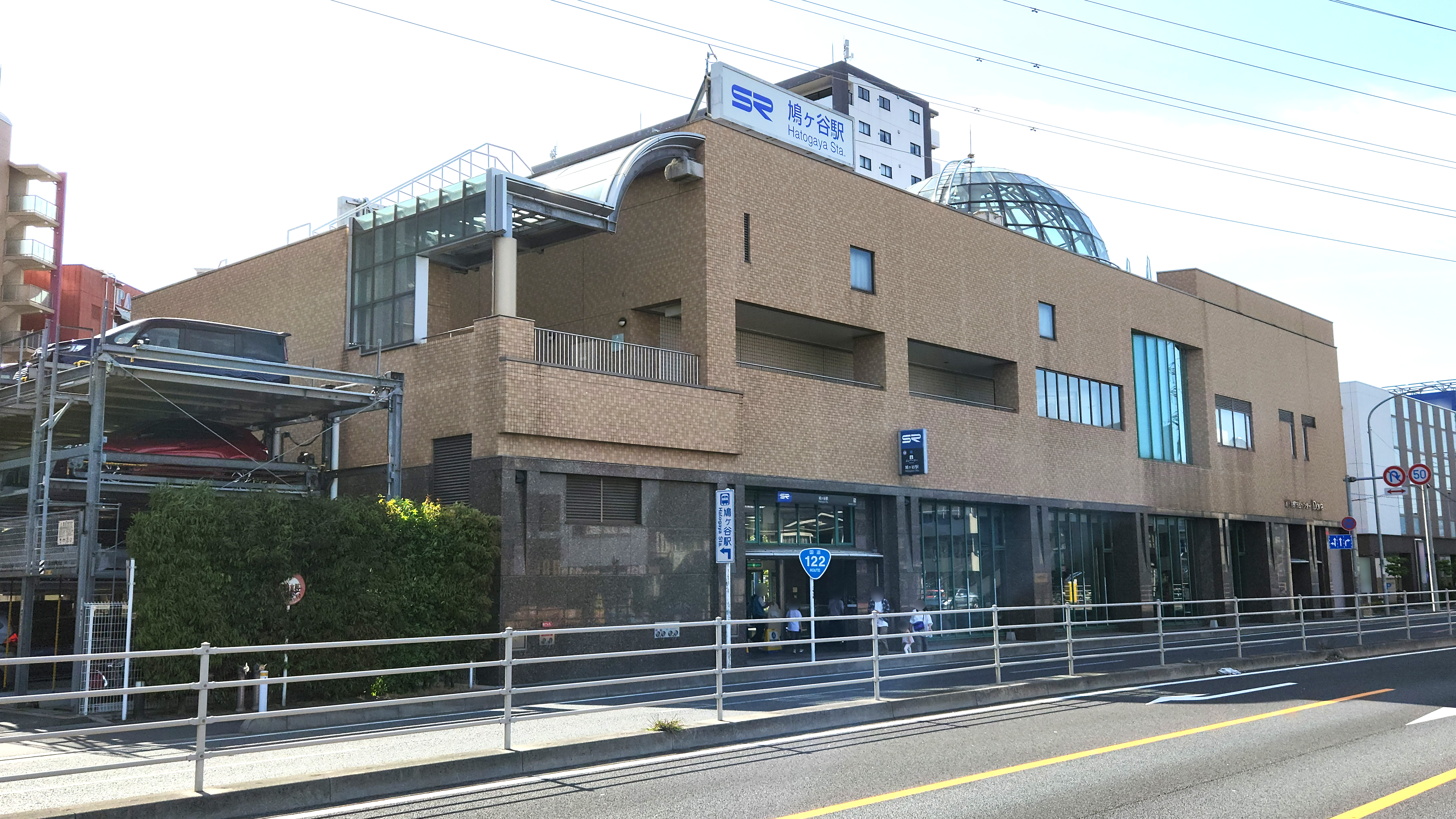
- Entrance to the underground station combined with Hatogaya Station Civic Center in May 2023

General information
- Location: Sato 1650-1, Kawaguchi-shi, Saitama-ken 334-0005; Japan
- Coordinates: 35°49′51″N 139°44′09″E
- Operator: Saitama Rapid Railway
- Line: Saitama Railway Line
- Distance: 5.9 km (3.7 mi) from Akabane-iwabuchi
- Platforms: 1 island platform
- Tracks: 2
- Connections: Bus stop

Construction
- Structure type: Underground

Other information
- Station code: SR22
- Website: Official website

History
- Opened: 28 March 2001; 25 years ago

Passengers
- FY2019: 11,990 daily

Services
Preceding station	Saitama Rapid Railway	Following station
Minami-hatogaya towards Akabane-iwabuchi	Saitama Railway Line	Araijuku towards Urawa-misono
Location
- Location within Tokyo Bay and Bōsō Peninsula Location within Saitama Prefecture Location within Japan

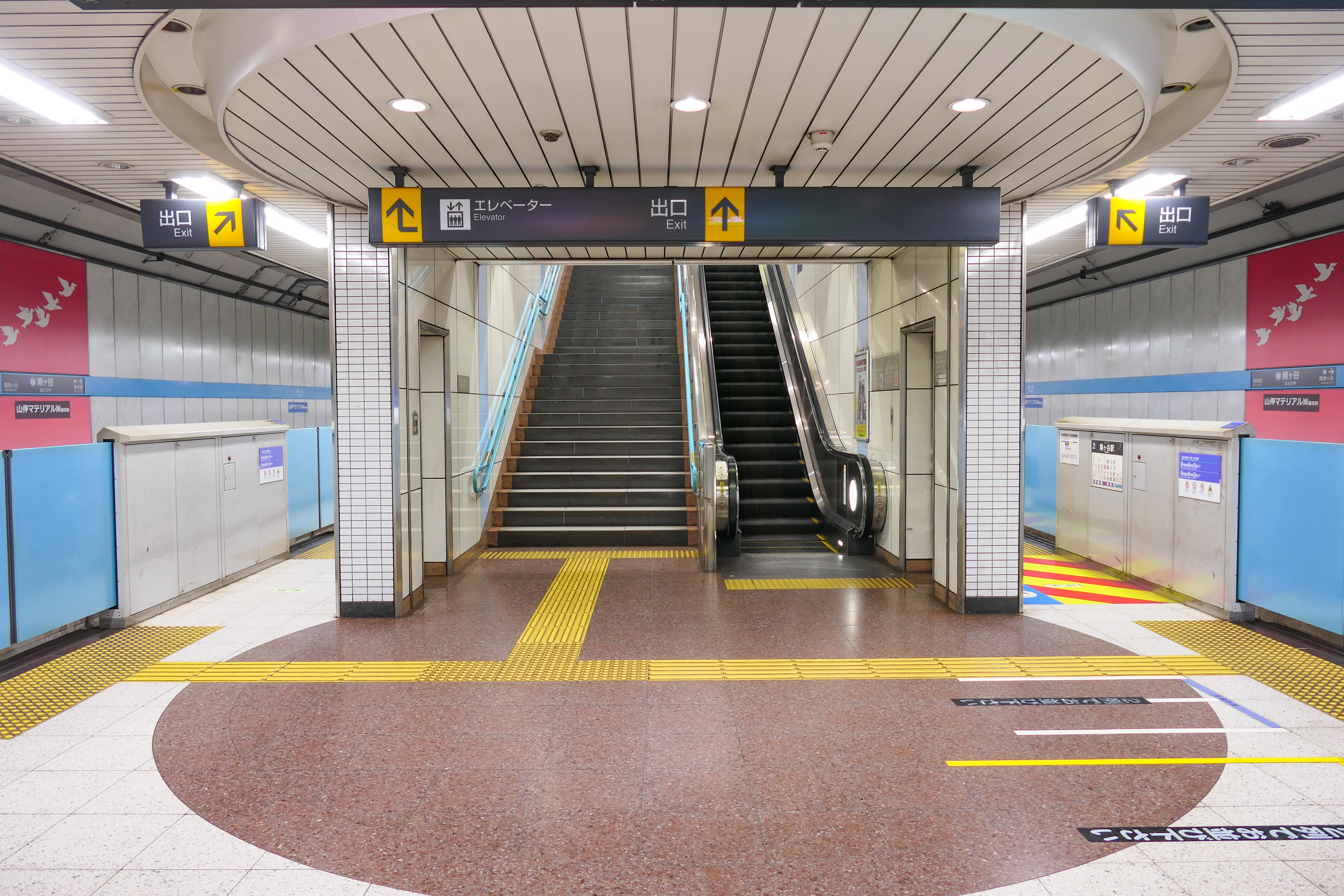
The platforms on 4 December 2022

Hatogaya Station (鳩ヶ谷駅, Hatogaya-eki) is a passenger railway station on the Saitama Rapid Railway Line in the city of Kawaguchi, Saitama, Japan, operated by the third sector railway operator Saitama Railway Corporation.

== Lines ==
Hatogaya Station is served by the 14.6 km Saitama Rapid Railway Line, which extends from Akabane-iwabuchi in Kita, Tokyo to Urawa-Misono in Midori-ku, Saitama, and lies 5.9 km from the starting point of the line at Akabane-iwabuchi. The majority of services on the line continue southward onto the Tokyo Metro Namboku Line to Meguro and on the Tokyu Meguro Line to Hiyoshi in Kanagawa Prefecture.

== Station layout ==
The station has an underground island platform serving two tracks. The platforms are equipped with waist-height platform edge doors.

=== Platforms ===
1	■ Saitama Rapid Railway Line	for Urawa-Misono
2	■ Saitama Rapid Railway Line	for Akabane-iwabuchi; Tokyo Metro Namboku Line for Meguro; Meguro Line for Hiyoshi; Tokyu Shin-Yokohama Line for Shin-Yokohama Station; Sotetsu Main Line for Ebina via the Tokyu/Sotetsu Shin-Yokohama Line

=== Facilities and accessibility ===
The station concourse and platforms have elevator access. Universal access toilets are available on the concourse level.

== History ==
Hatogaya Station opened on 28 March 2001 with the opening of the Saitama Rapid Railway Line.

== Passenger statistics ==
In fiscal 2019, the station was used by an average of 11,990 passengers daily.

== Surrounding area ==
- National Route 122
- Saitama Prefectural Kawaguchi High School
- Saitama Prefectural Hatogaya High School
- Kawaguchi Municipal Kawaguchi Sogo High School

== See also ==
- List of railway stations in Japan
