= Kawaguchi-motogō Station =

Railway station in Kawaguchi, Saitama Prefecture, Japan

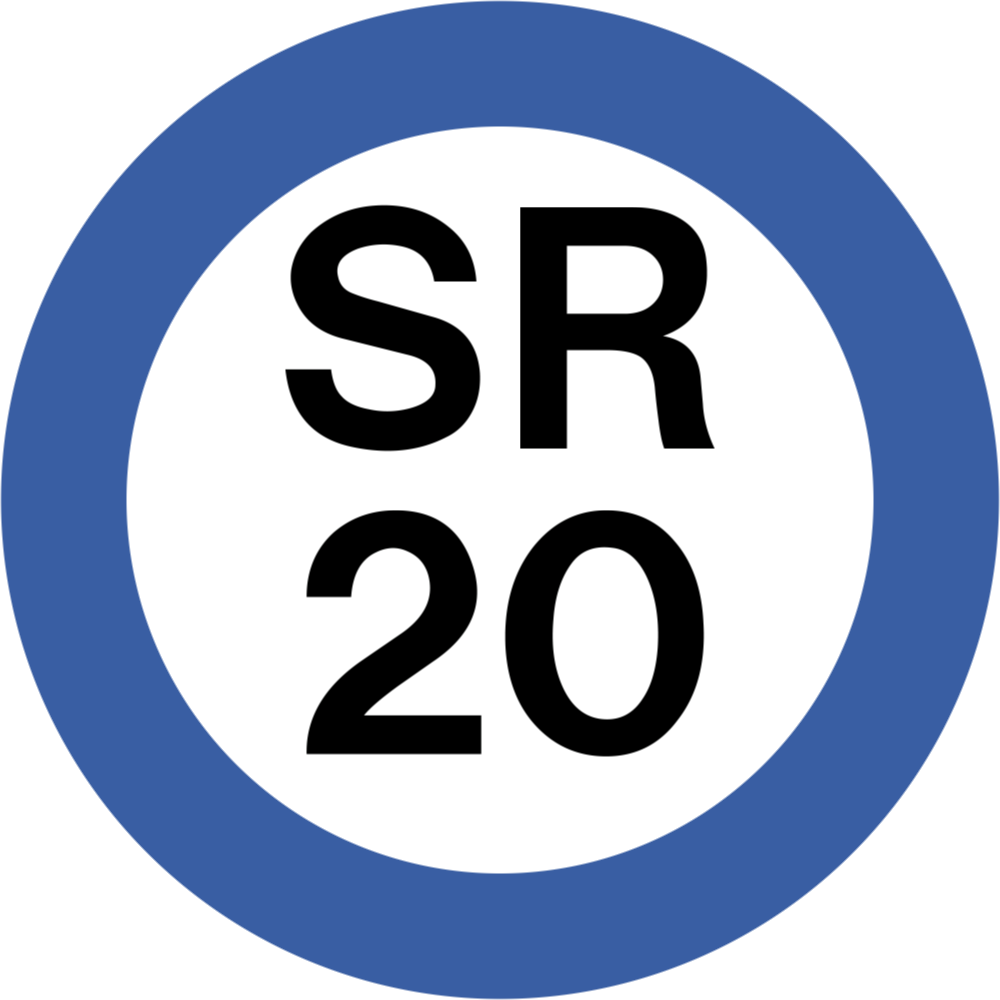
Kawaguchi-motogō Station 川口元郷駅

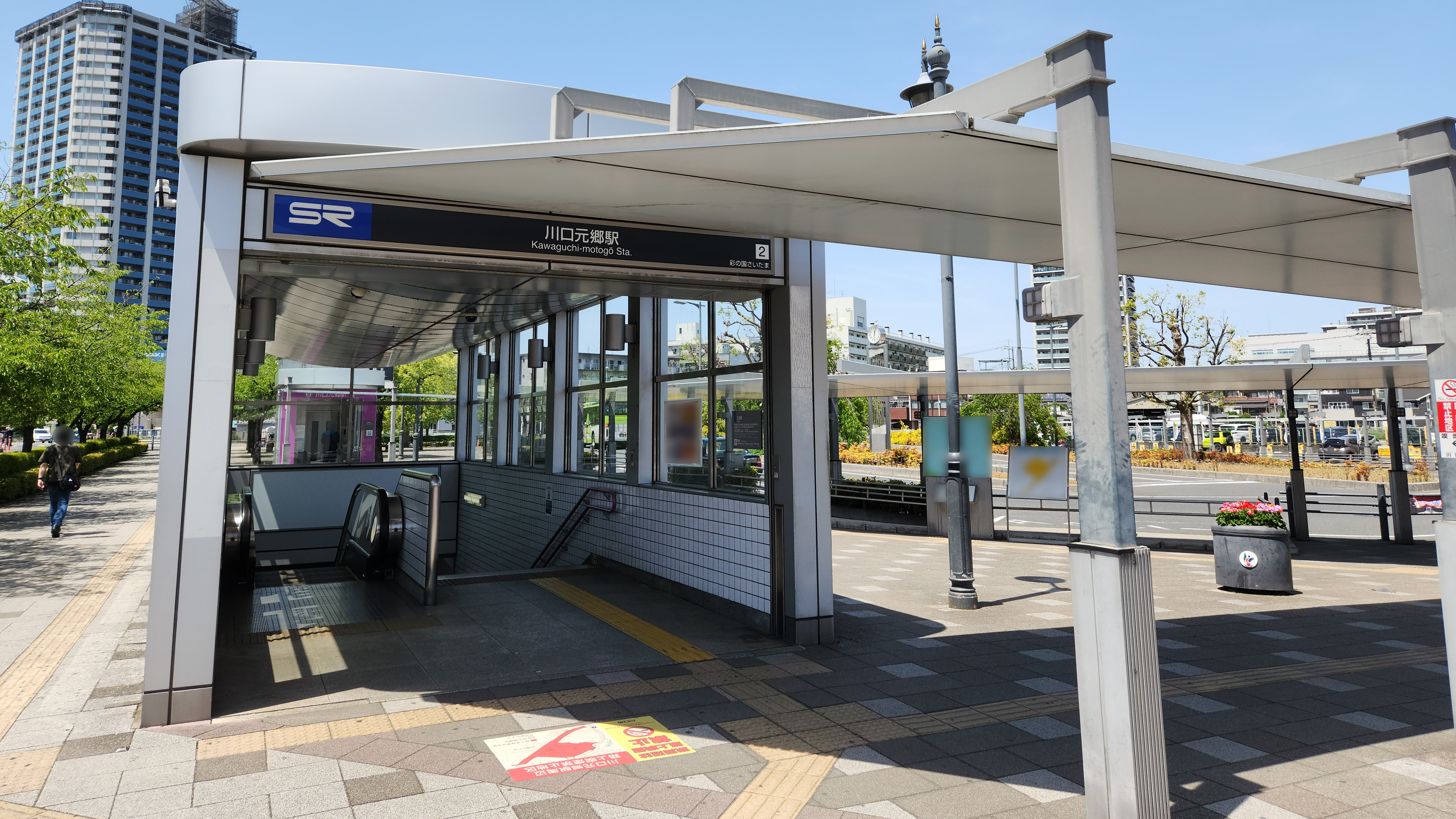
- The no.2 entrance in May 2023

General information
- Location: 1-2-15 Motogō, Kawaguchi-shi, Saitama-ken 332-0011; Japan
- Coordinates: 35.8004°N 139.7303°E
- Operator: Saitama Rapid Railway
- Line: Saitama Railway Line
- Distance: 2.4 km (1.5 mi) from Akabane-iwabuchi
- Platforms: 1 island platform
- Tracks: 2
- Connections: Bus stop

Other information
- Station code: SR20
- Website: Official website

History
- Opened: 28 March 2001; 25 years ago

Passengers
- FY2019: 10,672 daily

Services
| Preceding station | Saitama Rapid Railway | Following station |
|---|---|---|
| Akabane-iwabuchi Terminus | Saitama Railway Line | Minami-hatogaya towards Urawa-misono |
Location
- Location within Saitama Prefecture Location within Japan

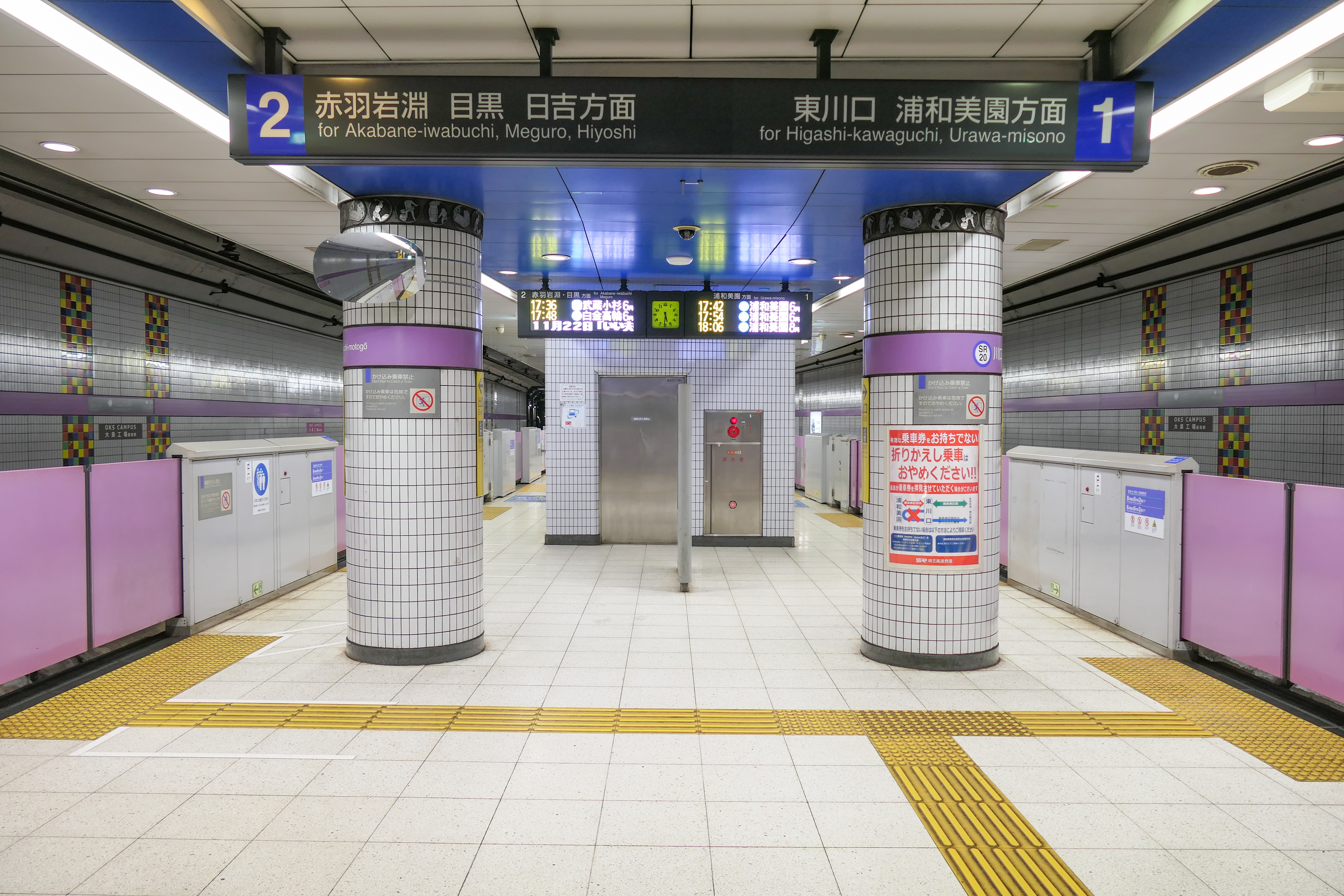
Kawaguchi-motogō Station platforms on 4 December 2022

Kawaguchi-motogō Station (川口元郷駅, Kawaguchi-motogō-eki) is a passenger railway station on the Saitama Rapid Railway Line in Kawaguchi, Saitama, Japan, operated by the third-sector railway operator Saitama Railway Corporation.

== Lines ==
Kawaguchi-motogō Station is served by the 14.6 km Saitama Rapid Railway Line, which extends from Akabane-iwabuchi in Kita, Tokyo to Urawa-Misono in Midori-ku, Saitama, and lies 2.4 km from the starting point of the line at Akabane-iwabuchi. The majority of services on the line continue southward onto the Tokyo Metro Namboku Line to Meguro and on the Tokyu Meguro Line to Hiyoshi in Kanagawa Prefecture.

== Station layout ==
The station has an underground island platform serving two tracks. The platforms are equipped with waist-height platform edge doors.

=== Platforms ===
| 1 | ■ Saitama Rapid Railway Line | for Urawa-Misono |
| 2 | ■ Saitama Rapid Railway Line | for Akabane-iwabuchi; Tokyo Metro Namboku Line for Meguro; Meguro Line for Hiyoshi; Tokyu Shin-Yokohama Line for Shin-Yokohama Station; Sotetsu Main Line for Ebina via the Tokyu/Sotetsu Shin-Yokohama Line |

=== Facilities and accessibility ===
The station concourse and platforms have elevator access. Universal access toilets are available on the concourse level.

== History ==
Kawaguchi-motogō Station opened on 28 March 2001 with the opening of the Saitama Rapid Railway Line.

== Passenger statistics ==
In fiscal 2019, the station was used by an average of 10,672 passengers daily.

== Surrounding area ==
- Kawaguchi Station (Keihin-Tohoku Line, approximately 600 m away)
- National Route 122
- Arakawa River
- Kawaguchi City Office
- Motogō Hikawa Shrine
- Kawaguchi Kogyo General Hospital
- Kawaguchi Motogō Minami Elementary School

== See also ==
- List of railway stations in Japan
