= Akabane-iwabuchi Station =

Railway and metro station in Tokyo, Japan

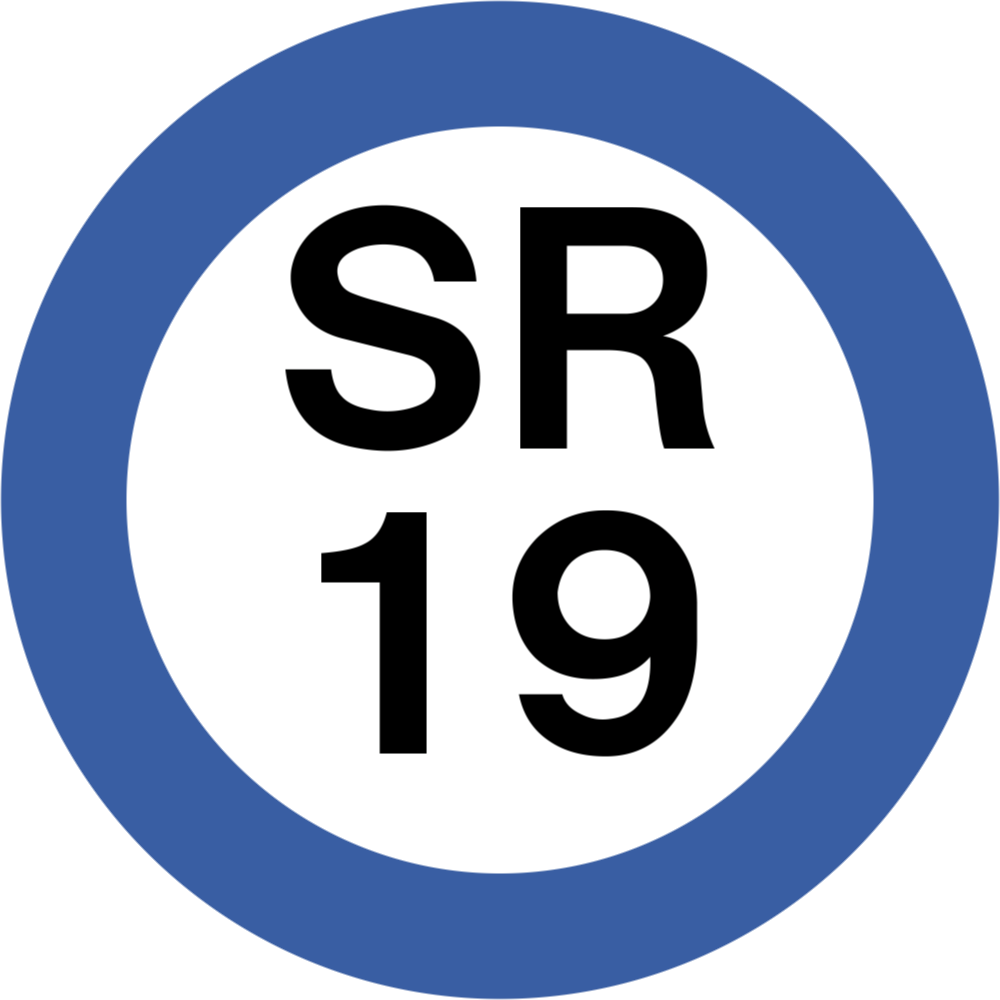
Akabane-iwabuchi Station 赤羽岩淵駅

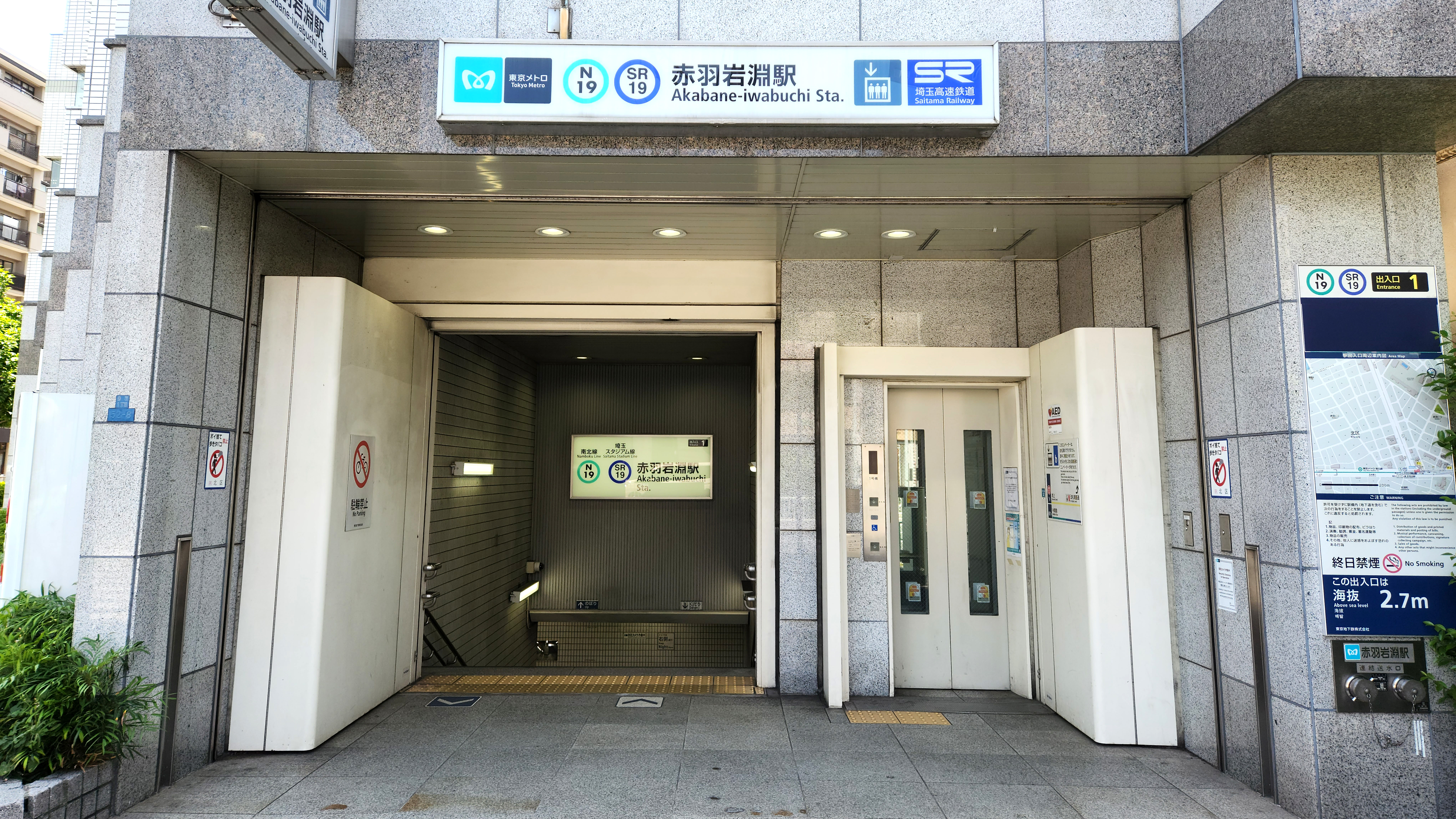
- A station entrance in May 2023

General information
- Location: 1-52-8 Akabane, Kita-ku, Tokyo; Japan
- Coordinates: 35°47′0″N 139°43′20″E
- Operator: Tokyo Metro (manager); Saitama Rapid Railway
- Lines: Namboku Line; Saitama Railway Line
- Platforms: 1 island platform
- Tracks: 2

Construction
- Structure type: Underground

Other information
- Station code: N-19 (Tokyo Metro); SR19 (Saitama Railway Corporation)

History
- Opened: 29 November 1991; 34 years ago

Services
Preceding station	Tokyo Metro	Following station
Shimo towards Meguro	Namboku Line	through to Saitama Railway Line
Preceding station	Saitama Rapid Railway	Following station
through to Namboku Line	Saitama Railway Line	Kawaguchi-motogō towards Urawa-misono
Location
- Location within Special wards of Tokyo Location within Tokyo Location within Japan

Akabane-iwabuchi Station (赤羽岩淵駅, Akabane-iwabuchi-eki) is a subway station in Kita, Tokyo, Japan, operated jointly by the Tokyo subway operator Tokyo Metro and the third-sector railway operator Saitama Railway Corporation.

== Lines ==
Akabane-iwabuchi Station is the northern terminus of the Tokyo Metro Namboku Line, with most services continuing northward on the Saitama Rapid Railway Line to Urawa-Misono. The station is numbered "N-19" on the Tokyo Metro network.

== Station layout ==
The station concourse with ticket vending machines and barriers is located on the 2nd basement ("B2F") level, and the tracks are located on the 3rd basement ("B3F") level.

=== Platforms ===
The station has one island platform serving two tracks. The platforms are equipped with full-height platform screen doors.

1
2
Saitama Rapid Railway Line
Namboku Line
for Hatogaya, Higashi-Kawaguchi, and Urawa-misono
- for Iidabashi, Shirokane-takanawa, and Meguro
- Meguro Line for Hiyoshi
- Tokyu Shin-Yokohama Line for Shin-Yokohama Station
- Sotetsu Main Line for Ebina via the Tokyu/Sotetsu Shin-Yokohama Line

=== Facilities and accessibility ===
The station concourse and platforms have elevator access. Universal access toilets are available on the 2nd basement level.

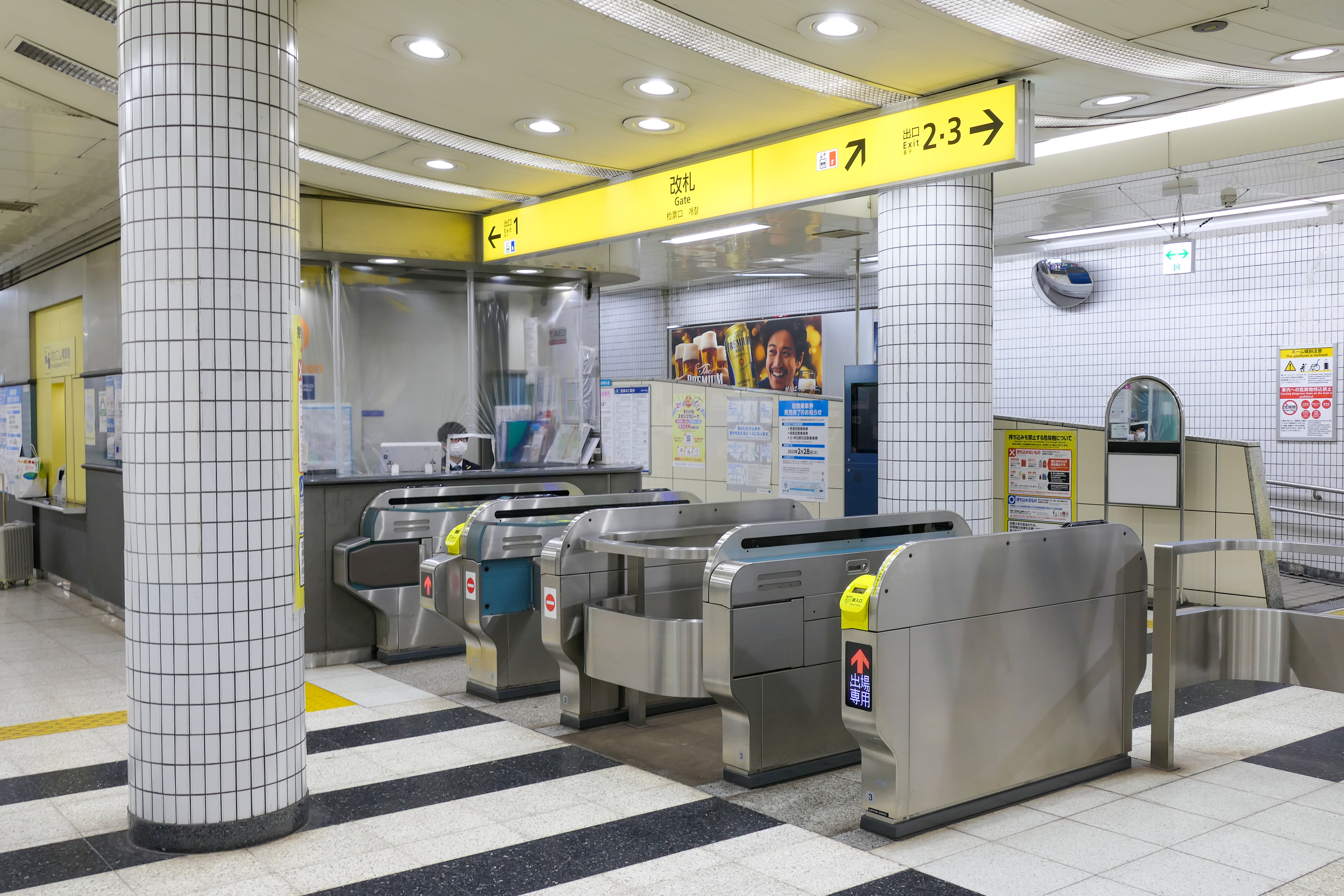
Ticket gates in December 2022

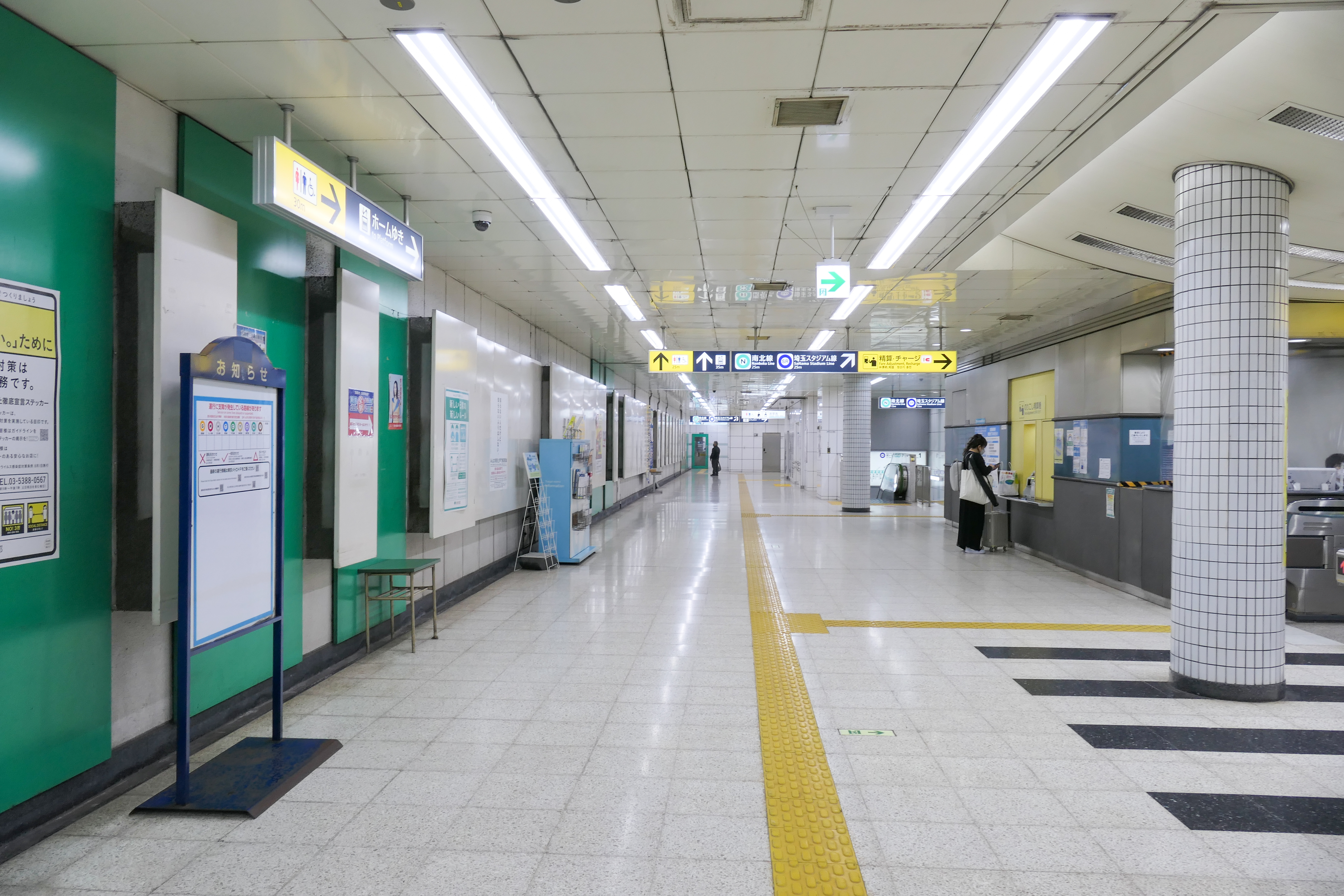
Station concourse in December 2022

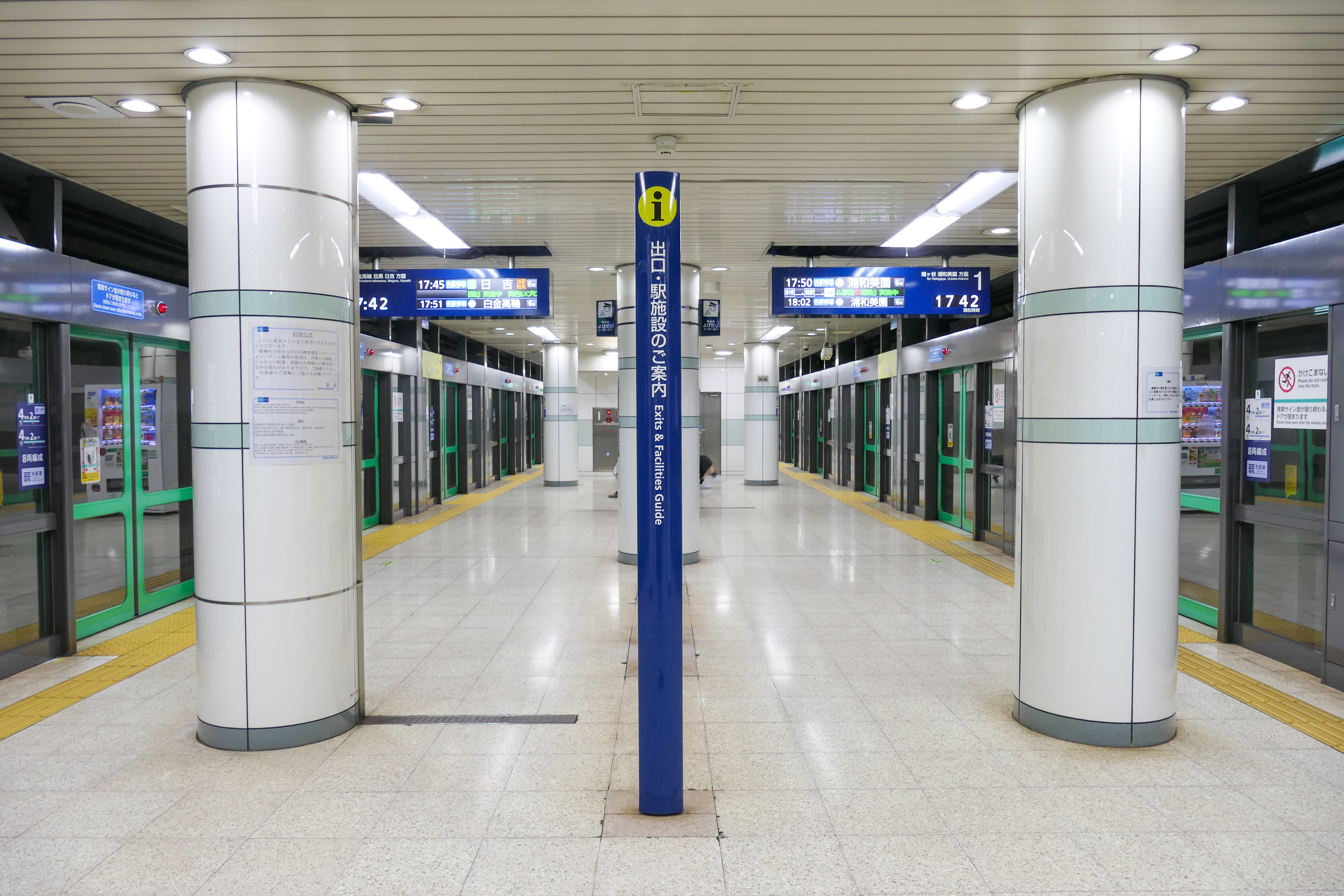
Platform in December 2022

== History ==
Akabane-Iwabuchi Station opened on the Teito Rapid Transit Authority (TRTA) Namboku Line on 29 November 1991. The Saitama Rapid Railway Line extending northward from the station opened on 28 March 2001.

The station facilities were inherited by Tokyo Metro after the privatization of the TRTA in 2004.

Effective the timetable revision on 18 March 2023, through services onto the Sagami Railway commenced courtesy of the Tokyu and Sotetsu Shin-Yokohama Line. Most southbound services past Hiyoshi continue as far south as Shin-Yokohama and Ebina.

== Passenger statistics ==
In fiscal 2011, the station was used by an average of 72,807 Tokyo Metro passengers daily and 34,395 Saitama Rapid Railway Line (boarding passengers only).

== Surrounding area ==
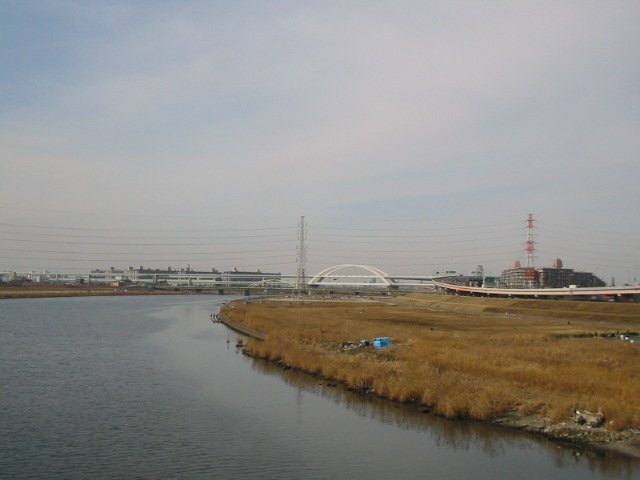
The Arakawa River

- Akabane Station (approximately 400 m away)
- National Route 122
- Arakawa River
- Seibi Gakuen College
- Iwabuchi Elementary School
- No. 4 Iwabuchi Elementary School
- Akabane Elementary School

== See also ==
- List of railway stations in Japan
