= Urawa University =

Private University in Saitama, Japan

Coordinates: 35.890250°N 139.712950°E

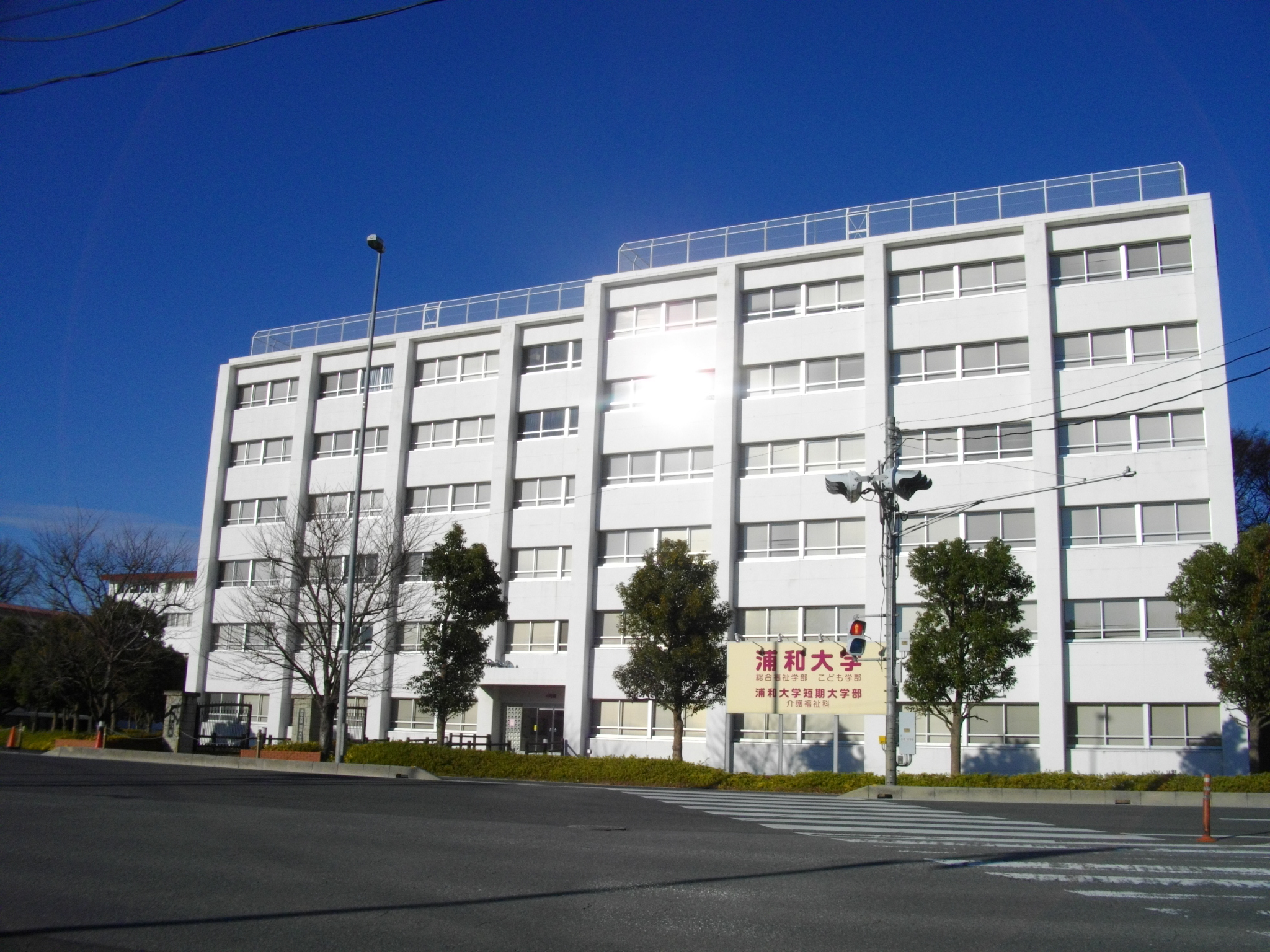
Bldg. #4

Urawa University (浦和大学, Urawa Daigaku) is a private university in Saitama, Saitama Prefecture, Japan, established in 2003. The predecessor of the school was founded in 1946.
