= Seibi Gakuen College =

Coordinates: 35°47′3.1″N 139°42′52.7″E

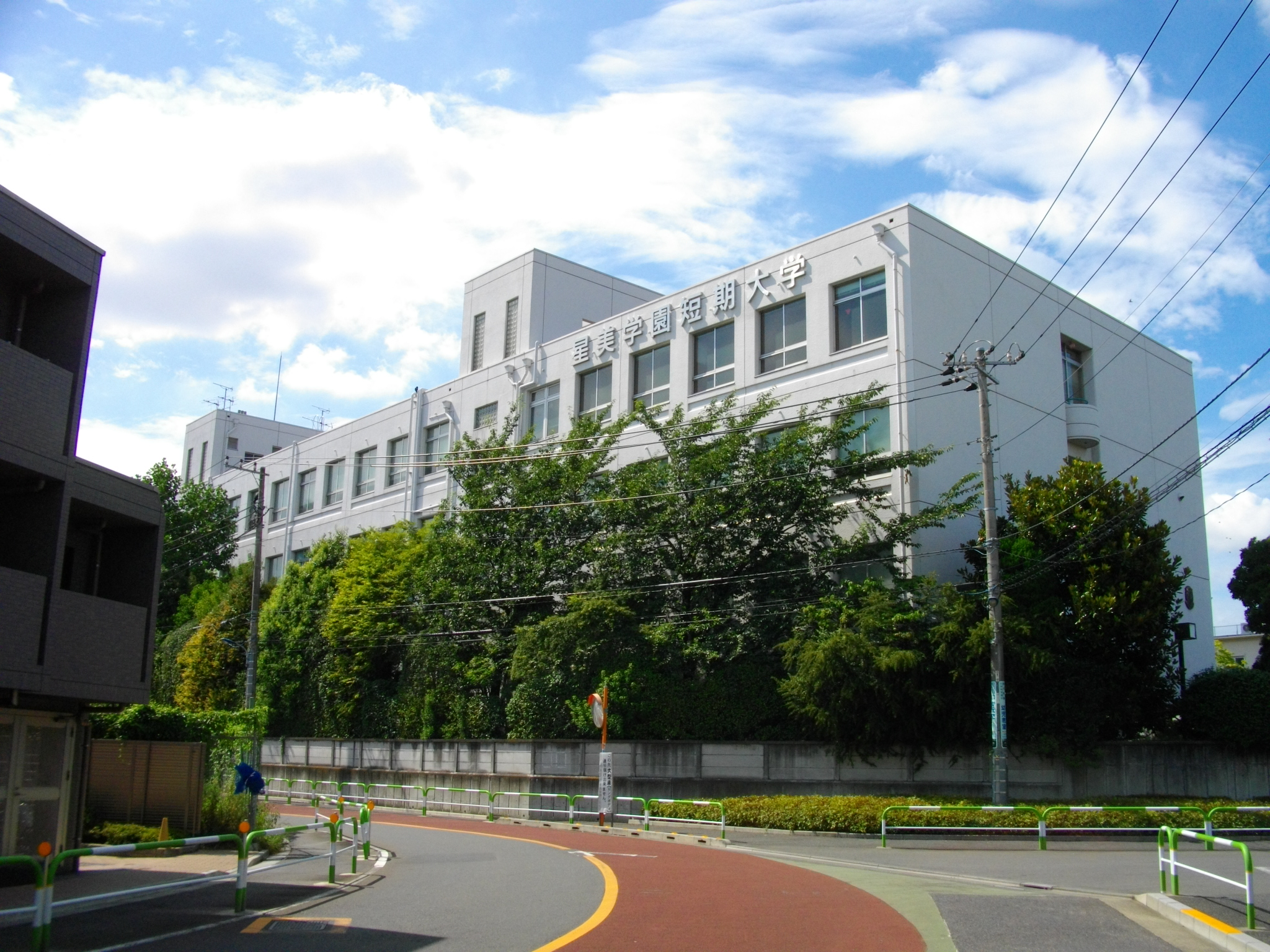
Seibi Gakuen College

Seibi Gakuen College (星美学園短期大学, Seibi gakuen tanki daigaku) is a private junior college in Kita, Tokyo, Japan. The precursor of the school was founded in 1939, and it was chartered as a university in 1960.
