= Saitama Rapid Railway Line =

Railway line in Tokyo & Saitama, Japan

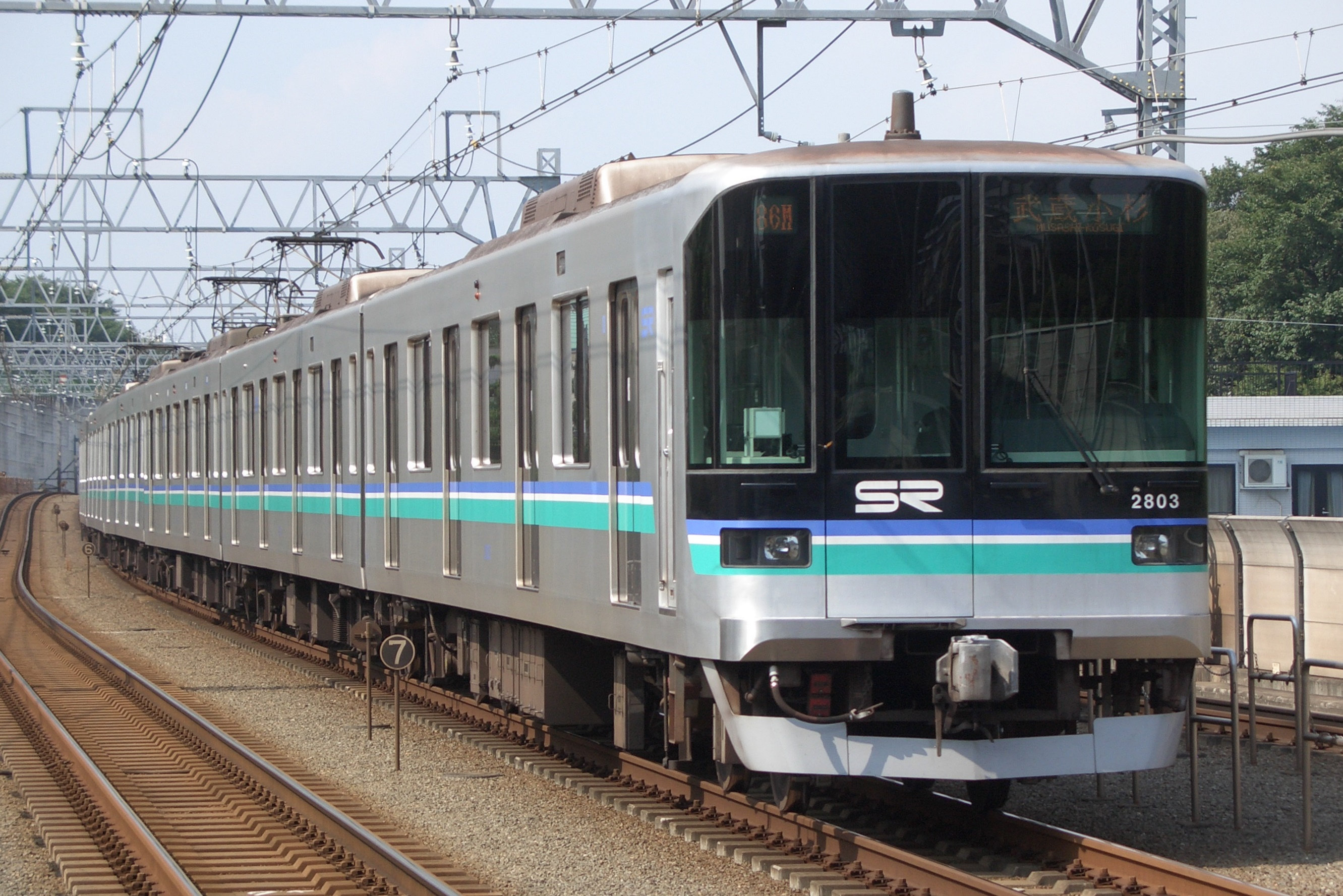
- A Saitama Rapid Railway 2000 series EMU in September 2005

Overview
- Other name: Saitama Stadium Line (埼玉スタジアム線)
- Owner: Saitama Railway Corporation
- Locale: Tokyo, Saitama Prefecture
- Termini: Akabane-Iwabuchi; Urawa-Misono
- Stations: 8
- Website: s-rail.co.jp/index.html

Service
- Type: Rapid transit
- Depot: Urawa-Misono

History
- Opened: 28 March 2001; 25 years ago

Technical
- Line length: 14.6 km (9.1 mi)
- Number of tracks: 2
- Track gauge: 1,067 mm (3 ft 6 in)
- Minimum radius: 248 m (814 ft)
- Electrification: Overhead line, 1,500 V DC
- Operating speed: 80 km/h (50 mph)
Route map

The Saitama Rapid Railway Line (Japanese: 埼玉高速鉄道線, Hepburn: Saitama Kōsoku Tetsudō-sen) is a mostly underground rapid transit line in Japan operated by the third-sector operating company Saitama Railway Corporation. Funded by Saitama Prefecture, local municipal governments, and Tokyo Metro, it forms a continuation of the Tokyo Metro Namboku Line, starting at Akabane-iwabuchi Station in Tokyo and ending at Urawa-Misono Station in Saitama. The line is used as the main means of transportation to Saitama Stadium 2002. On 27 November 2015, the route was nicknamed the "Saitama Stadium Line". The line symbol used in the station numbering is "SR".

== Overview ==
This line allows trains from the Tokyo Metro Namboku Line to operate beyond Akabane-iwabuchi Station into Saitama Prefecture and ending at Urawa-Misono Station.

Most of the line is underground, only Urawa Misono Station and adjacent depots are on the surface. It connects the eastern and northern part of Kawaguchi to Tokyo; areas that were previously only served by buses.

Planning for the line stated in 1972 as an extension of the Tokyo Metro Namboku Line. The original alignment was planned to serve eastern Urawa and central Kawaguchi in Saitama. In 1985, the alignment was shifted east to Hatogaya. In 1992, the third sector Saitama Railway Corporation was established by Saitama Prefecture, and construction began in 1995. The line opened on 28 March 2001, ahead of the 2002 FIFA World Cup, which held several matches at the Saitama Stadium, half an hour on foot from the terminating Urawa-Misono Station.

The total cost of construction is 256.1 billion yen, making the cost per kilometer at 17.5 billion yen. Since its opening, the line used six-car trains with all stations (except Urawa-Misono Station) equipped with platforms long enough support future expansion into eight-car trains. Urawa-Misono Station was built as a temporary terminal as the line was planned to be extended further north in the future so it only has platforms long enough for six car trains.

A further northern extension beyond Urawa Misono Station connecting Iwatsuki Station of the Tobu Urban Park Line and Hasuda Station of the JR Utsunomiya Line (Tohoku Line) is currently being proposed.

== Stations ==
No./Colour	Station	Distance in km (mi)	Transfers	Location	
↑ Through-running to/from ↑ Namboku Line for Meguro; Meguro Line for Hiyoshi; Tōkyū Shin-Yokohama Line for Shin-Yokohama; Sōtetsu Main Line for Ebina; Sōtetsu Izumino Line for Shōnandai (via Futamata-gawa on the Sōtetsu Main Line)
SR-19	Akabane-iwabuchi 赤羽岩淵	0 (0)	Namboku Line (N-19); Utsunomiya Line (Akabane: JU04); Shōnan–Shinjuku Line (Akabane: JS22); Keihin–Tōhoku Line (Akabane: JK38); Saikyō Line (Akabane: JA15)	Kita	Tokyo
SR-20	Kawaguchi-motogō 川口元郷	2.4 (1.5)		Kawaguchi	Saitama; Prefecture
SR-21	Minami-hatogaya 南鳩ヶ谷	4.3 (2.7)		Kawaguchi	Saitama; Prefecture
SR-22	Hatogaya 鳩ヶ谷	5.9 (3.7)		Kawaguchi	Saitama; Prefecture
SR-23	Araijuku 新井宿	7.5 (4.7)		Kawaguchi	Saitama; Prefecture
SR-24	Tozuka-angyō 戸塚安行	10.0 (6.2)		Kawaguchi	Saitama; Prefecture
SR-25	Higashi-Kawaguchi 東川口	12.2 (7.6)	Musashino Line	Kawaguchi	Saitama; Prefecture
SR-26	Urawa-misono 浦和美園	14.6 (9.1)		Midori-ku, Saitama	Saitama; Prefecture

== Rolling stock ==
- Tokyo Metro 9000 series 6/8-car EMUs
- Tokyu 3000 series 8-car EMUs
- Tokyu 3020 series 8-car EMUs
- Tokyu 5080 series 8-car EMUs
- Saitama Rapid Railway 2000 series 6-car EMUs
- Sotetsu 21000 series 8-car EMUs

== Shareholders ==
As of 2013, the main shareholders in Saitama Railway Corporation are as follows.

Shareholder	Percentage
Saitama Prefecture	45.0
Tokyo Metro	19.4
City of Kawaguchi	18.7
City of Saitama	7.1

== Ridership ==
Ridership figures for the line are as follows.

Fiscal year	Total passengers	Passengers/km day
2009	30.564 million	40,038
2010	31.051 million	40,770
2011	30.983 million	40,546

== History ==
The third sector company, Saitama Railway Corporation, was established on 25 March 1992.

The entire line from Akabane-Iwabuchi to Urawa-Misono opened on 28 March 2001.

Through services to and from Hiyoshi on the Tokyu Meguro Line commenced on 22 June 2008.

On 1 April 2022, eight-car trains began operating on the line.

Effective the timetable revision on 18 March 2023, the Sotetsu Shin-Yokohama Line and Tokyu Shin-Yokohama Line began revenue service. Most through services originating from Urawa-Misono continuing onto the Tokyu Line terminate at either Shin-Yokohama Station or Ebina Station.

== Future developments ==
In the future, the line may be extended north from Urawa-Misono through Iwatsuki-ku, Saitama to Hasuda Station (in Hasuda, Saitama) on the JR East Utsunomiya Line, but financial problems have prevented construction of the extension.

== See also ==
- List of rapid transit systems
