= Urawa-misono Station =

Railway station in Saitama, Japan

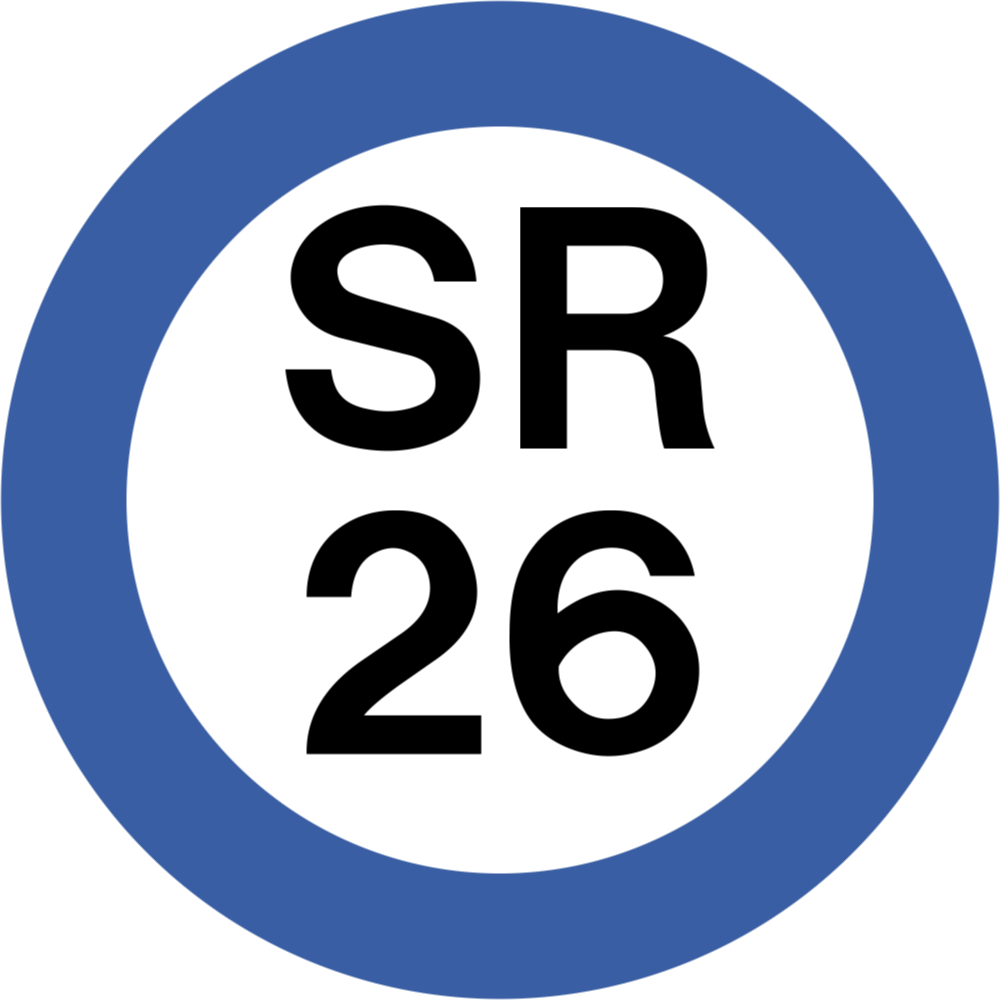
Urawa-misono Station 浦和美園駅

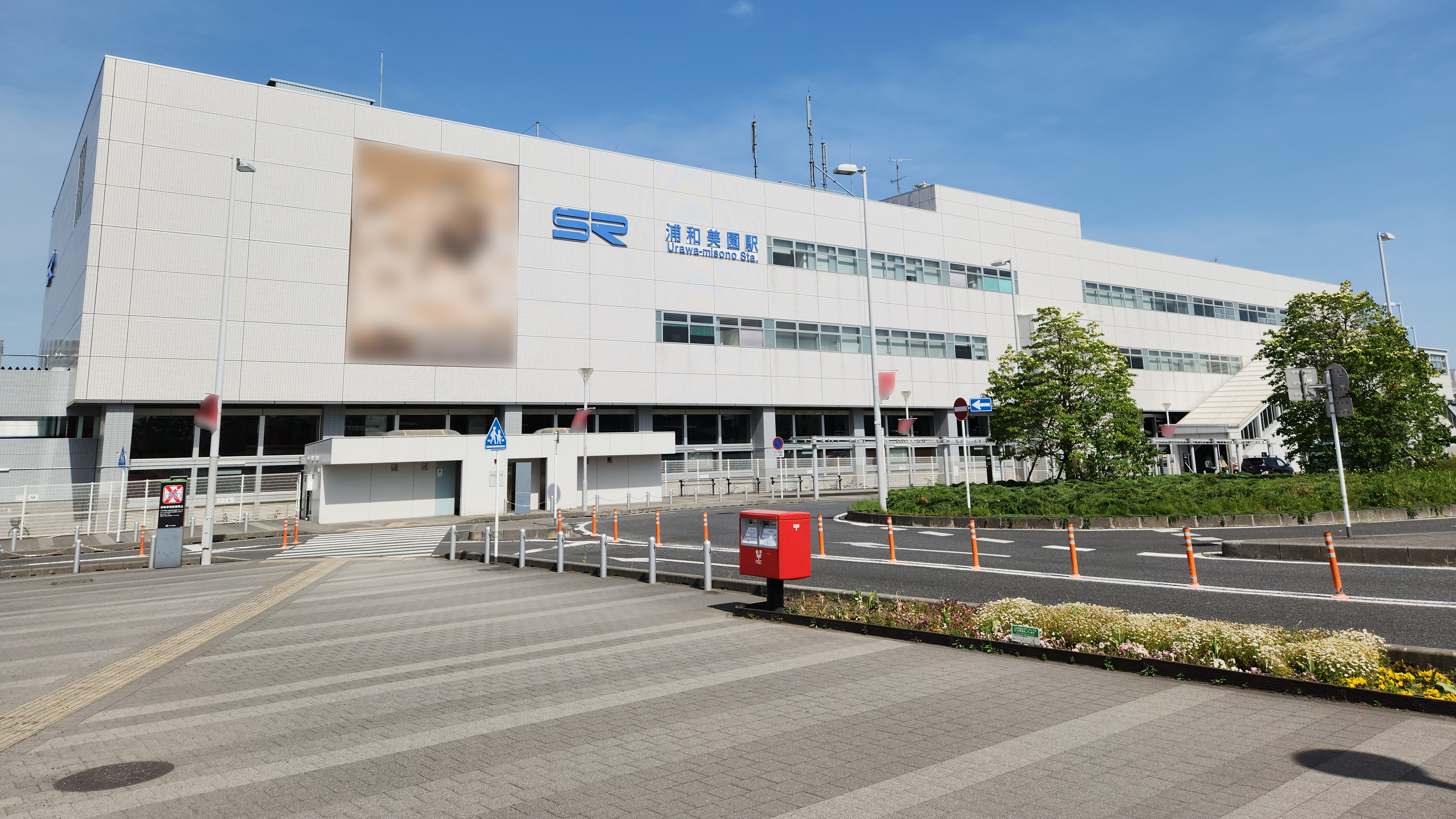
- The west side of the station in May 2023

General information
- Location: 4–12 Misono, Midori-ku, Saitama City, Saitama Prefecture 336-0967; Japan
- Coordinates: 35.8934°N 139.7280°E
- Operator: Saitama Rapid Railway
- Line: Saitama Railway Line
- Distance: 14.6 km (9.1 mi) from Akabane-iwabuchi
- Platforms: 1 island + 1 side platform
- Tracks: 2
- Connections: Bus stop

Construction
- Structure type: At grade

Other information
- Station code: SR26
- Website: Official website

History
- Opened: 28 March 2001; 25 years ago

Passengers
- FY2019: 11,220 daily

Services
Preceding station	Saitama Rapid Railway	Following station
Higashi-kawaguchi towards Akabane-iwabuchi	Saitama Railway Line	Terminus
Location
- Location within Saitama Prefecture Location within Japan

Urawa-misono Station (浦和美園駅, Urawa misono-eki) is a passenger railway station on the Saitama Rapid Railway Line located in Midori-ku, Saitama, Saitama Prefecture, Japan, operated by the third-sector railway operator Saitama Railway Corporation.

== Lines ==
Urawa-misono Station is served by the 14.6 km Saitama Rapid Railway Line from Akabane-iwabuchi in Kita, Tokyo, and forms the terminus of the line. The majority of services on the line continue southward onto the Tokyo Metro Namboku Line to Meguro and on the Tokyu Meguro Line to Hiyoshi in Kanagawa Prefecture.

== Station layout ==
The station has an island platform serving two ground-level tracks. An additional side platform (platform 3) is located on the opposite side of track 2 for use during special events at the nearby Saitama Stadium attended by large crowds. All platforms are equipped with chest-height platform edge doors.

=== Platforms ===
1-3
Saitama Rapid Railway Line
- for Akabane-iwabuchi
  Tokyo Metro Namboku Line for Meguro
- Meguro Line for Hiyoshi
- Tokyu Shin-Yokohama Line for Shin-Yokohama
- Sotetsu Main Line for Ebina via the Tokyu/Sotetsu Shin-Yokohama Line

=== Facilities and accessibility ===
The elevated station concourse and ground-level platforms all have elevator access. Universal access toilets are available on the concourse level.

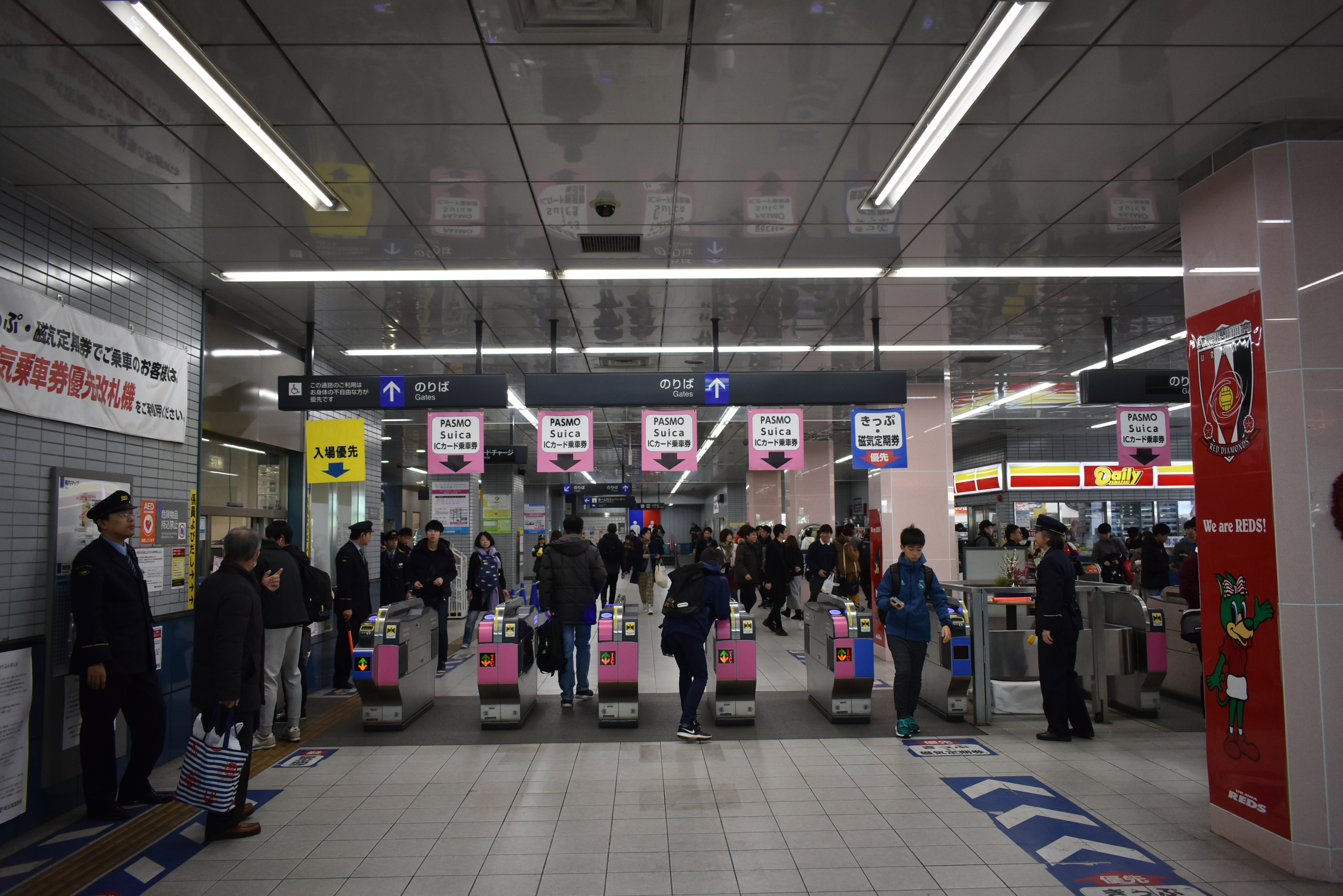
The station fare gates in January 2020

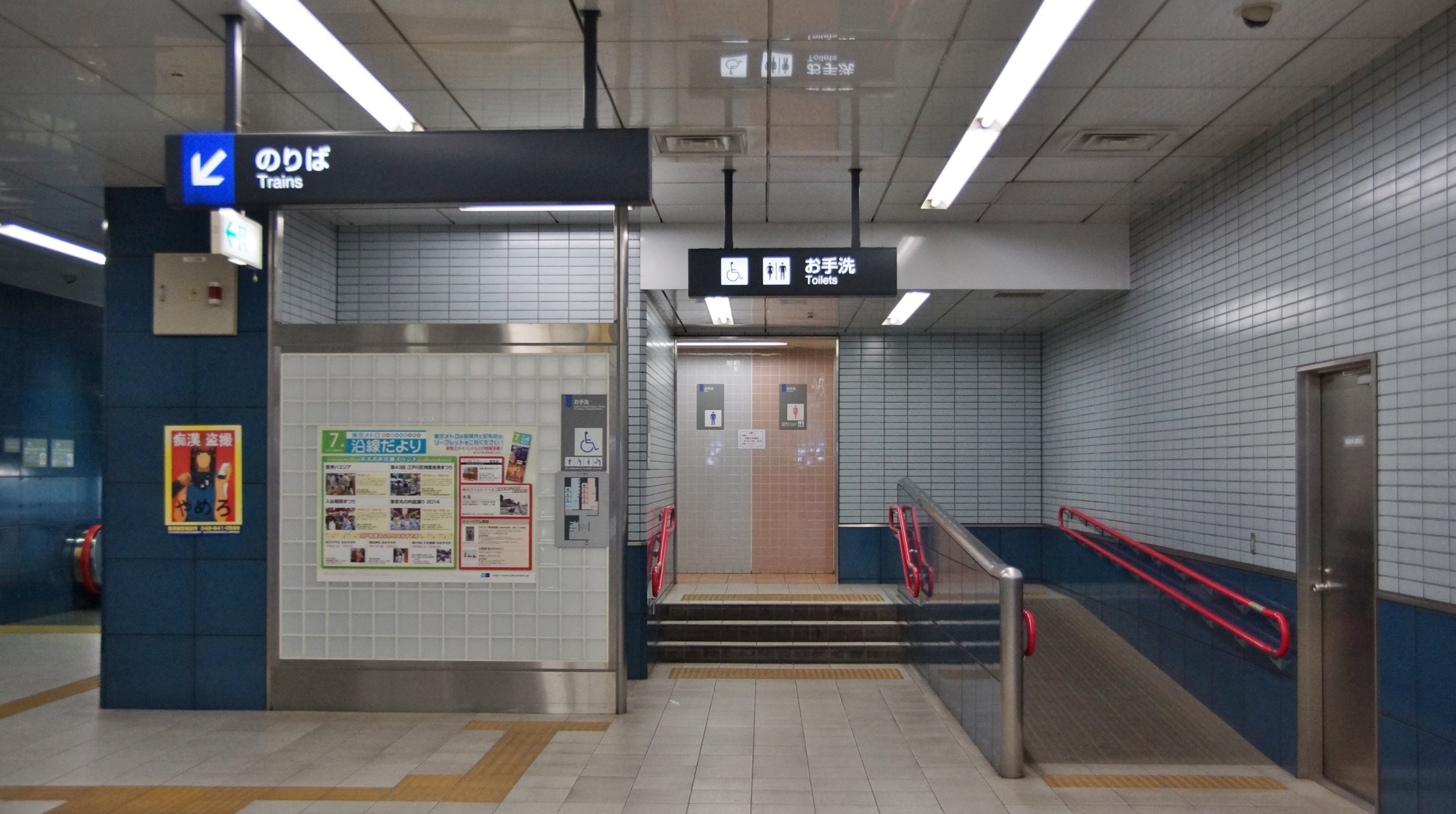
The station toilets in July 2014

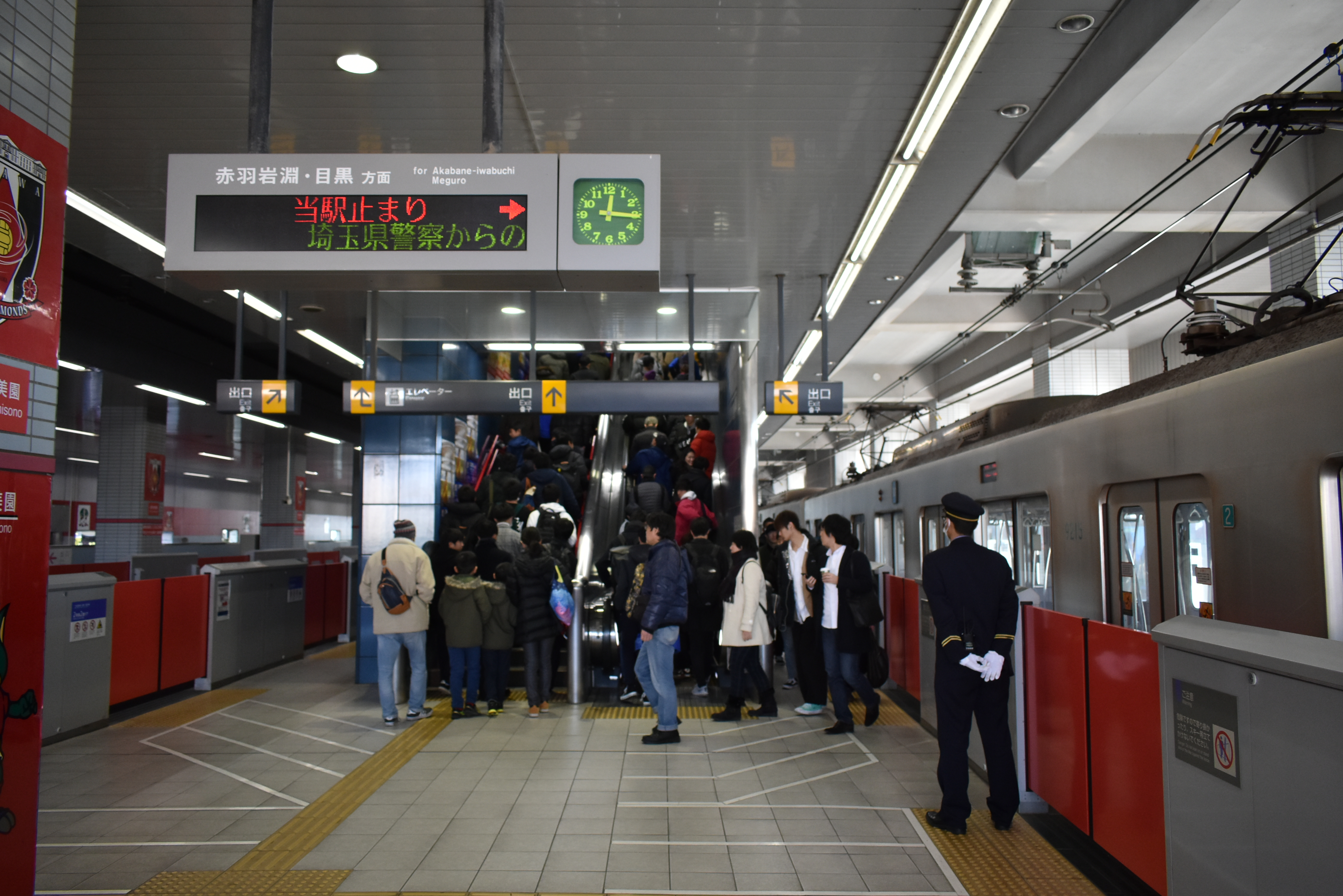
Platforms 1 (right) and 2 (left) in January 2020

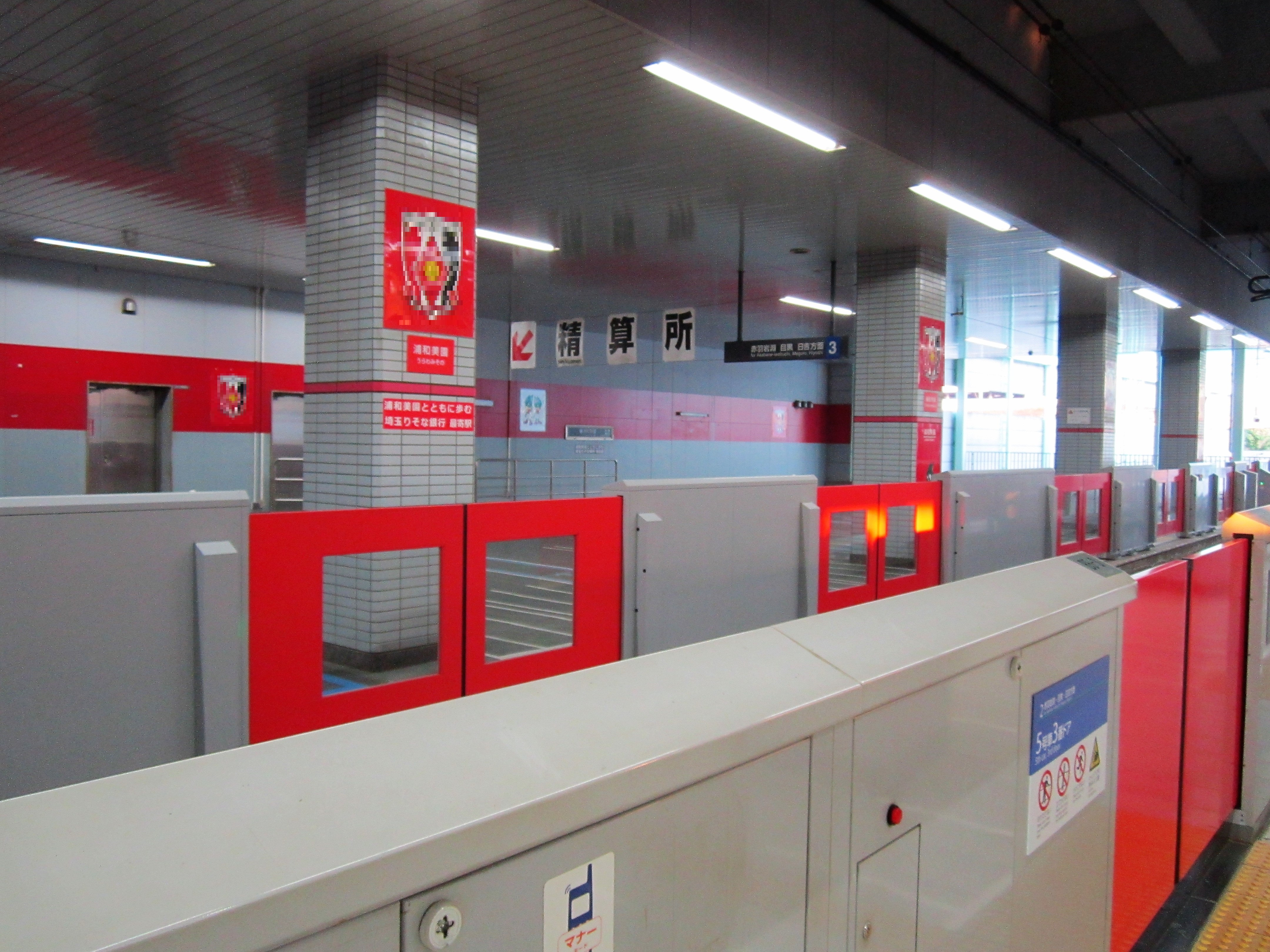
View of platform 3 in May 2019

== History ==
Urawa-misono Station opened on 28 March 2001 with the opening of the Saitama Rapid Railway Line.

Effective the timetable revision on 18 March 2023, the Sotetsu Shin-Yokohama Line and Tokyu Shin-Yokohama Line began revenue service. Most through services from this station onto the Sotetsu Line terminate at either Shin-Yokohama Station or Ebina Station.

== Buses ==
East Exit
Bus stop	No	Via	Destination	Company	Note
1	岩11-3	Sasakubo・Mejiro University・Iwatsuki Highschool	Iwatsuki Station	Kokusaikogyo	
2	浦02	Aeon Mall Urawa-Misono・Omagi・Harayama	Urawa Station East Exit	Kokusaikogyo	This bus on holidays runs without stopping Aeon Mall Urawa-Misono bus stop
2	岩11-3		Higashi-Kawaguchi Station North Exit	Kokusaikogyo	
3	J06	Non stop	Saitama Stadium North Gate	Kokusaikogyo	Runs only when J League or Japan Football Association are held
3	美100	Non stop	Shirakobato Water Park	Kokusaikogyo	Runs only in summer
4	Only students ride on		Urawa University		School bus
4	Only students ride on		Urawa-Gakuin Highschool		School bus
4	Highway Bus Adatara	Sano Shintoshin Bus Terminal・Saigo Bus stop・Yabuki-Izumizaki Bus stop・Sukagawa Office	Kōriyama Station (Fukushima)	Tobu Bus Central; Fukushima Transportation	Stop
4	Highway Bus Tōno・Kamaishi	Shin-Hanamaki Station・Tōno Station・Kamaishi Station	Michi-no-eki Yamada (Iwate-Funakoshi Station)	Kokusai Kogyo; IwateKen Transportation	Night Bus
West Exit
1	美01	Urawa University・Bypass Ōsaki・Nakao Rikkyō・Saitama Komaba	Urawa Station East Exit	Kokusai Kogyo	
2	大01	Urawa University・Someya-shidō・Katanagi Shisho・Nihon University mae	Ōmiya Station (Saitama) East Exit	Kokusai Kogyo	Operation opportunity is a little.
2	美80	Urawa University・Urawa-Gakuin Highschool・Urawa-Higashi Highschool	Saitama East Office	Kokusai Kogyo	

== Passenger statistics ==
In fiscal 2019, the station was used by an average of 11,220 passengers daily.

== Surrounding area ==
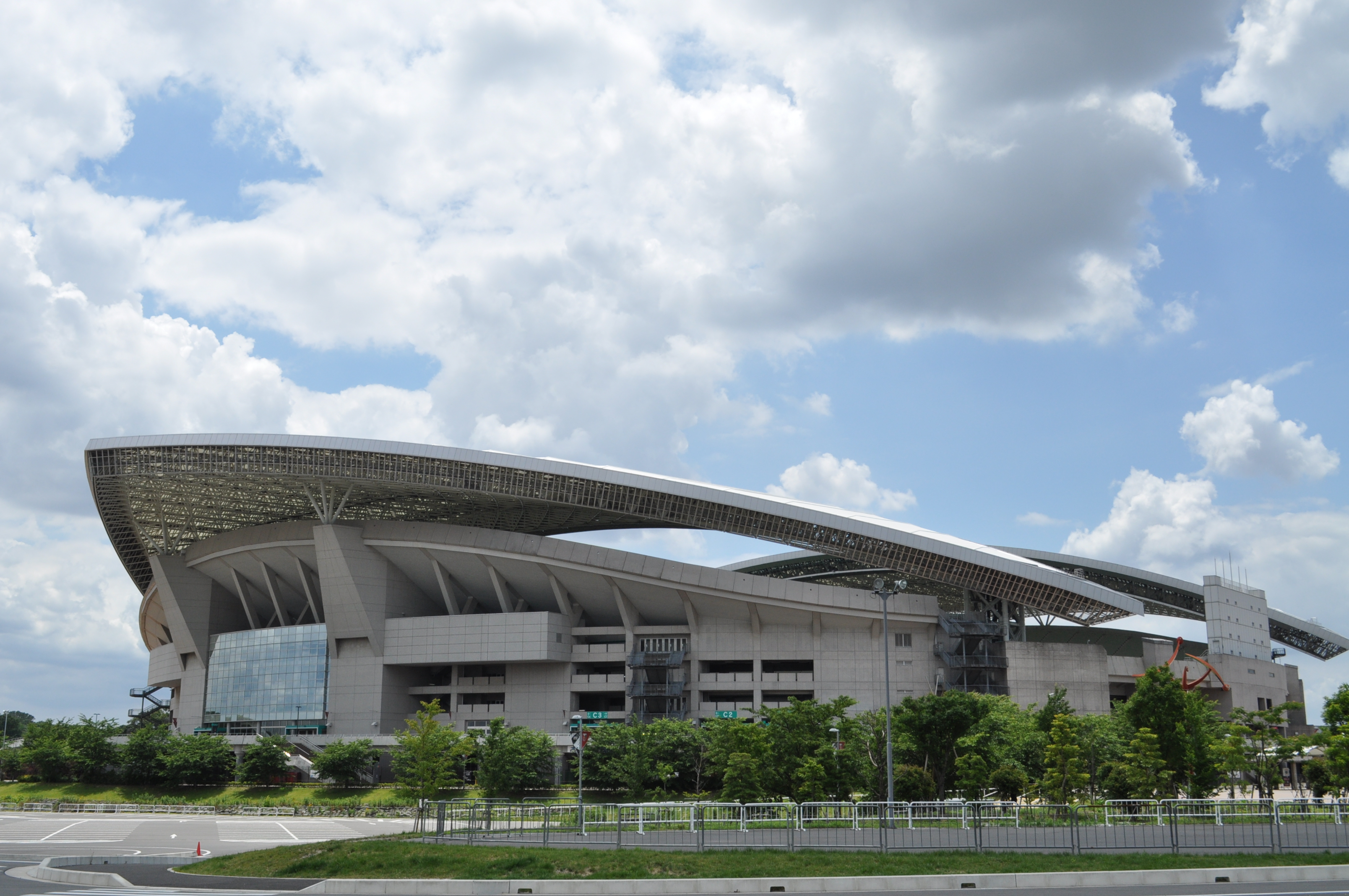
Saitama Stadium in June 2012

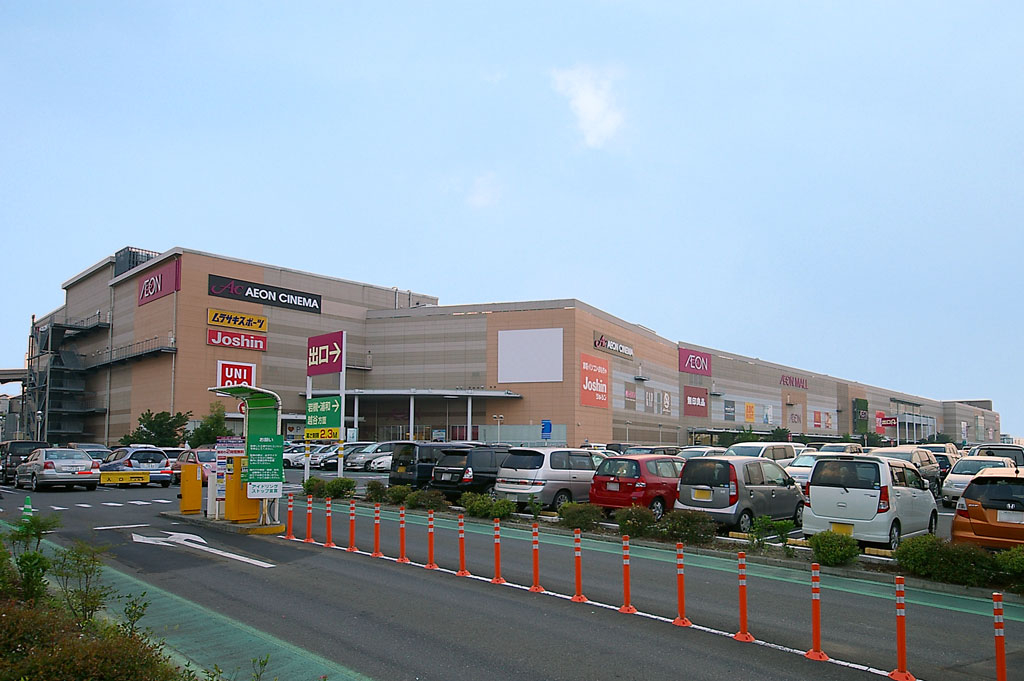
Aeon Mall Urawa-Misono in August 2013

- Saitama Stadium 2002
- Aeon Mall Urawa Misono shopping mall
- Urawa University
- Mejiro University (Saitama campus)
- National Route 122
- National Route 463
- Osaki Park
- Ayase River

== See also ==
- List of railway stations in Japan
