= Higashi-Urawa Station =

Railway station in Saitama, Japan

JM24 Higashi-Urawa Station 東浦和駅
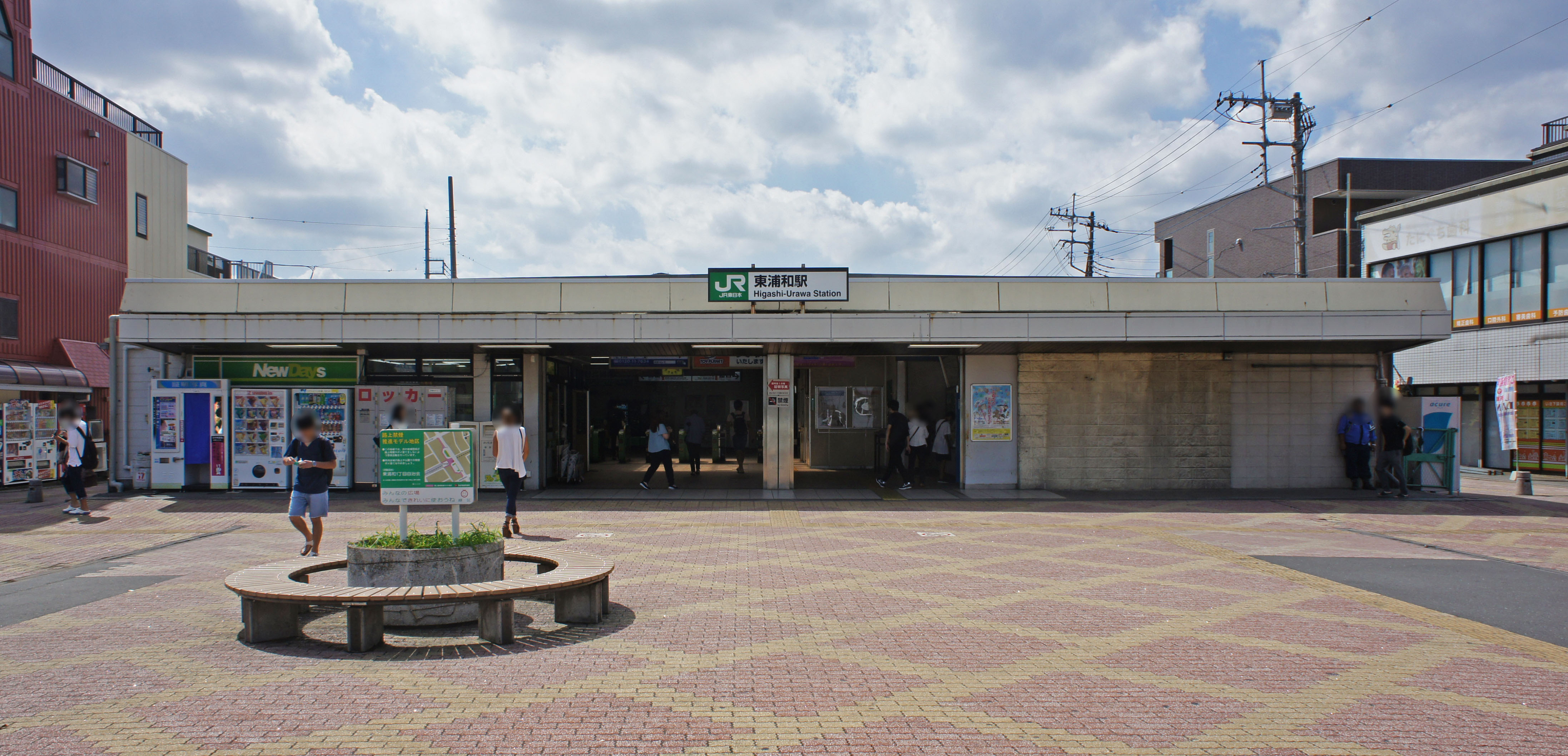
- Higashi-Urawa Station front, September 2019

General information
- Location: 1 Higashi-Urawa, Midori-ku, Saitama-shi, Saitama-ken 336-0926; Japan
- Coordinates: 35°51′50.8392″N 139°42′16.83″E
- Operator: JR East
- Line: ■ Musashino Line
- Distance: 35.4 km to Fuchūhommachi
- Platforms: 2 side platforms

Other information
- Status: Staffed
- Website: Official website

History
- Opened: 1 April 1973

Passengers
- FY2019: 28,934 daily

Services
Preceding station	JR East	Following station
Minami-Urawa JM25 towards Ōmiya	Shimōsa	Higashi-Kawaguchi JM23 towards Kaihimmakuhari
Minami-Urawa JM25 towards Fuchūhommachi	Musashino Line	Higashi-Kawaguchi JM23 towards Kaihimmakuhari or Tokyo
Location
- Location within Saitama Prefecture Location within Japan

Higashi-Urawa Station (東浦和駅, Higashi-Urawa-eki) is a passenger railway station on the Musashino Line located in Midori-ku, Saitama, Saitama Prefecture, Japan, operated by East Japan Railway Company (JR East).

== Lines ==
Higashi-Urawa Station is served by the Musashino Line between Fuchūhommachi and Nishi-Funabashi, with some trains continuing to Tokyo via the Keiyō Line. It is located 35.4 kilometers from Fuchūhommachi Station.

== Station layout ==
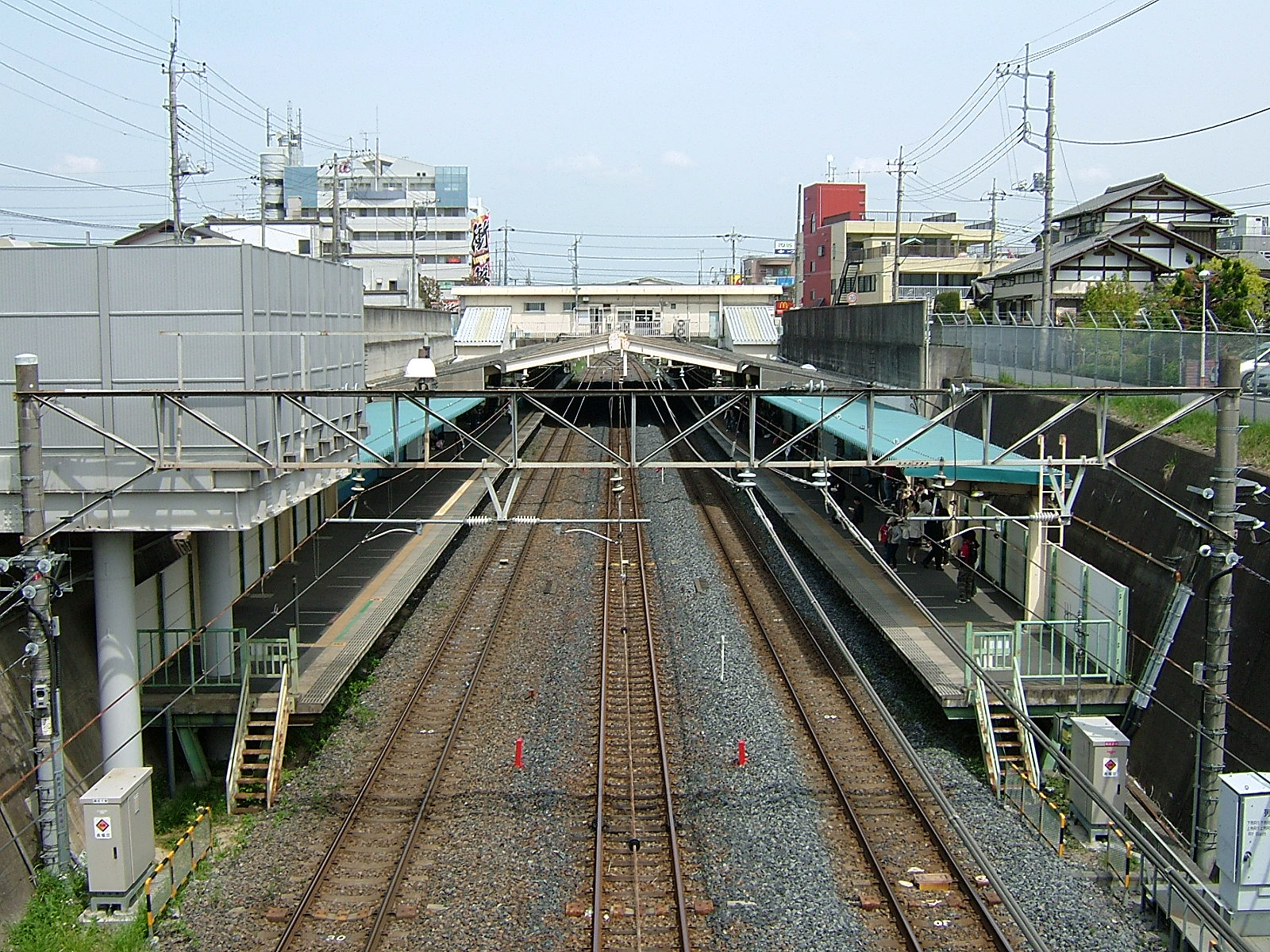
Overview of the platforms, April 2007

The station consists of two ground-level side platforms serving two tracks, with a third, central track for use by freight services. The platforms are connected to the station building by a footbridge. The station is staffed.

=== Platforms ===
1	Musashino Line	for Minami-Urawa, Nishi-Kokubunji, and Fuchūhommachi
2	Musashino Line	for Minami-Koshigaya, Shim-Matsudo, Nishi-Funabashi, Tokyo, and Kaihimmakuhari

== History ==
The station opened on 1 April 1973.

== Passenger statistics ==
In fiscal 2019, the station was used by an average of 28,934 passengers daily (boarding passengers only).

== Surrounding area ==
- Urawa Higashi Police Station
- Saitama Midori Ward Office
- Saitama Gakuen University
- Urawa University
- Urawa Junior College
- Kawaguchi Junior College
- Minuma Tsūsen-bori
- Hikawa Shrine

== See also ==
- List of railway stations in Japan
