= Minuma Tsūsen-bori =

Canal and lock system in Japan

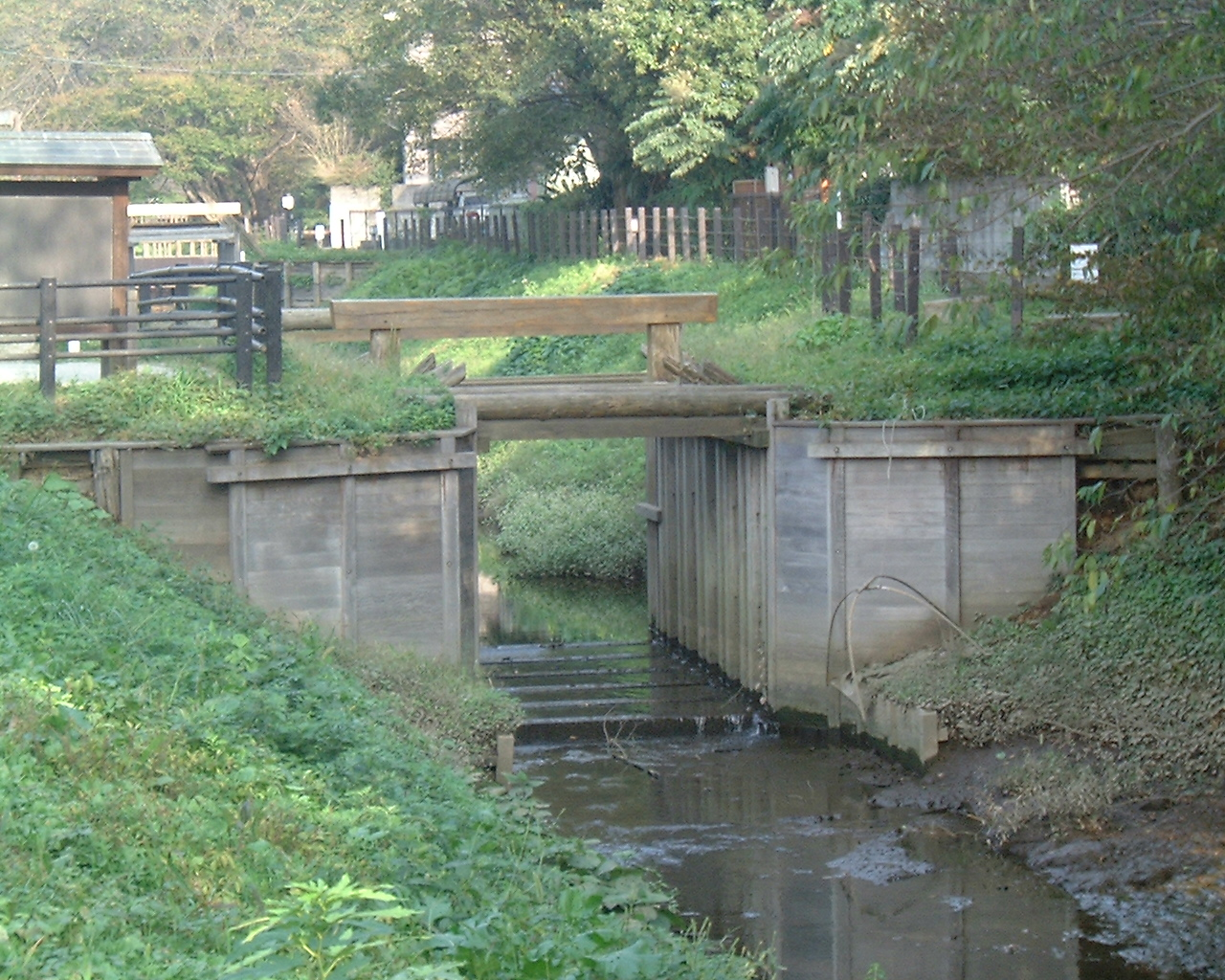
- Surviving Lock No.1 on the Minuma Tsūsen-bori

- Minuma Tsūsen-bori Minuma Tsūsen-bori (Japan)
- Location: Midori-ku, Saitama, Japan
- Country: Japan
- Coordinates: 35°51′50.01″N 139°42′49.73″E

Specifications
- Locks: 4

History
- Original owner: Tokugawa shogunate
- Principal engineer: Izawa Yasobei Tamenaga
- Construction began: 1729
- Date completed: 1731
- Date closed: 1931
- National Historic Site of Japan

The Minuma Tsūsen-bori (見沼通船堀) is Japan's oldest canal with a lock system. Built during the Edo period, it is located in what is now part of the cities of Saitama and Kawaguchi, Saitama Prefecture, Japan. It was designated a National Historic Site in 1982.

== Overview ==
The Minuma was a large wetland which had been converted into a reservoir during the early Edo Period by the construction of an 870 meter levee between current Tsukishima in Saitama and Kizoro in the city of Kawaguchi. In 1727, the Tokugawa shogunate decided to demolish the levee and to convert the area to new paddy fields. To ensure continual access to irrigational water in the region, an irrigation canal system supplied by the Tone River was introduced. Two canals were dug roughly in a north-to-south direction along the two plateaus that sandwich the region. These canals were separated by roughly a kilometer, with a natural river, the Shiba River, flowing in the valley in the middle. The Minuma Tsūsen-bori was completed in 1731 to connect these two canals, and to thus permit water transport between the new riceland, coastal villages and the metropolis of Edo. The engineer for both projects was Izawa Yasobei Tamenaga (井沢弥惣兵衛為永)

The Minuma Tsūsen-bori is 390 meters from the eastern canal and 650 meters from the western canal, but because there is a water level difference of three meters between the two waters and Shiba River, two locks were installed on each of the east and west branches of the Minuma Tsūsen-bori to enable the water level to be adjusted and boats raised and lowered. The period of use was from December to February each year when irrigation water is not needed. Ships using the canal and lock system were up to 14 meters long and two meters wide, and could caret about 200 bales of rice. Ships that leave Minuma entered the Shiba River, which connected to the Arakawa River, and eventually to the Sumida River, which runs through the commercial center of Edo. Cargoes for Edo included rice, wheat, vegetables, firewood, lumber, pickles, miso, sake, and other food products, whereas outgoing cargoes included salt, fish, soy sauce, and rubbish. During the Edo period, transport was monopolized by two clans of Edo merchants. Following the Meiji restoration, the Minuma Ferry Company was established in 1874 and although initially successful, revenues began to decline due to the spread of railway freight cars in the Taisho period with the opening of the Nippon Railway line between Ueno and Kumagaya in 1883 and the Tōhoku Main Line in 1885. Freight operations on the Minuma Tsūsen-bori were abolished in February 1931.

In 1955, the canal was designated at Saitama Prefectural Historic Site. In 1960, it became part of the Saitama Prefectural Anko Bunan Park. It received National Historic Site protection in 1982, with the area covered by the designation increased in 2002.

Of the four separate locks which were originally built, three were reconstructed between 1994 and 1997. The restored structures are located in Midori-ku, Saitama. A model of a ferry boat used on the canal is displayed at the Saitama City Urawa Museum (Midori Ward, Saitama City).

== See also ==
- List of Historic Sites of Japan (Saitama)
