= Higashi-Kawaguchi Station =

Railway station in Kawaguchi, Saitama Prefecture, Japan

Higashi-Kawaguchi Station 東川口駅
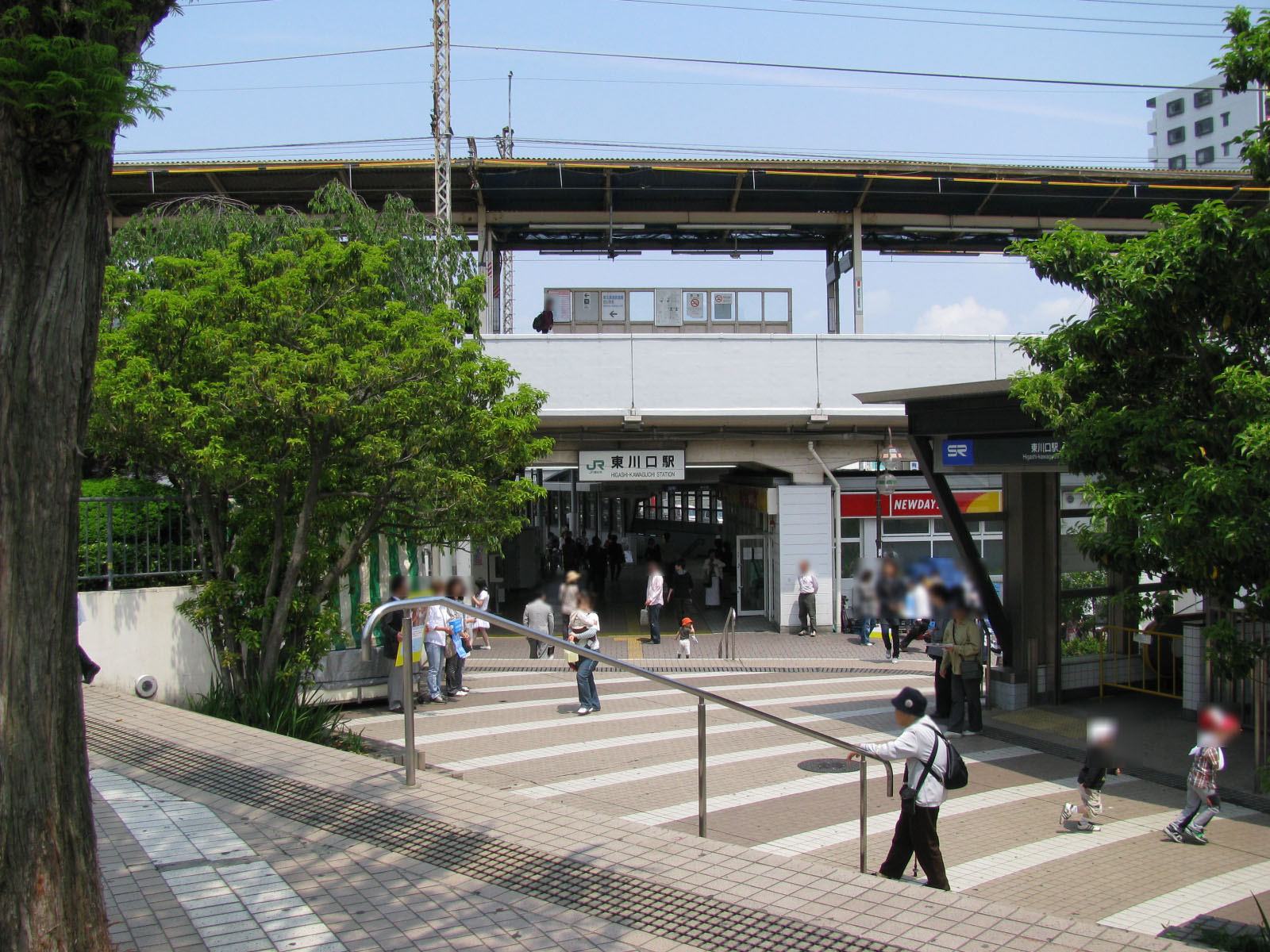
- The south side of the JR East station with the entrance to the Saitama Railway station on the right, May 2008

General information
- Location: Kawaguchi, Saitama Prefecture; Japan
- Coordinates: 35°52′30.9468″N 139°44′38.93″E
- Operator: JR East; Saitama Rapid Railway
- Lines: Musashino Line; Saitama Railway Line
- Platforms: 2 island platforms
- Connections: Bus stop
Location
- Location within Saitama Prefecture Location within Japan

Higashi-Kawaguchi Station (東川口駅, Higashi-Kawaguchi-eki) is an interchange passenger railway station in located in the city of Kawaguchi, Saitama, Japan, jointly operated by East Japan Railway Company (JR East) and the third sector railway operator Saitama Railway Corporation.

== Lines ==
The JR East station is served by the orbital Musashino Line from Fuchūhommachi to Nishi-Funabashi and Tokyo. It is located 39.2 kilometers from Fuchūhommachi Station.

The Saitama Railway Station is served by the 14.6 km Saitama Rapid Railway Line, which extends from Akabane-iwabuchi in Kita, Tokyo to Urawa-Misono in Midori-ku, Saitama, and lies 12.2 km from the starting point of the line at Akabane-iwabuchi. The majority of services on the line continue southward onto the Tokyo Metro Namboku Line to Meguro and on the Tokyu Meguro Line to Hiyoshi in Kanagawa Prefecture.

== Station layout ==
The JR East part of the station consists of an elevated island platform serving two tracks, with the station building located underneath. The Saitama Railway part of the station is located underground, and also consists of an island platform serving two tracks.

== JR East ==
JM23 Higashi-Kawaguchi Station 東川口駅
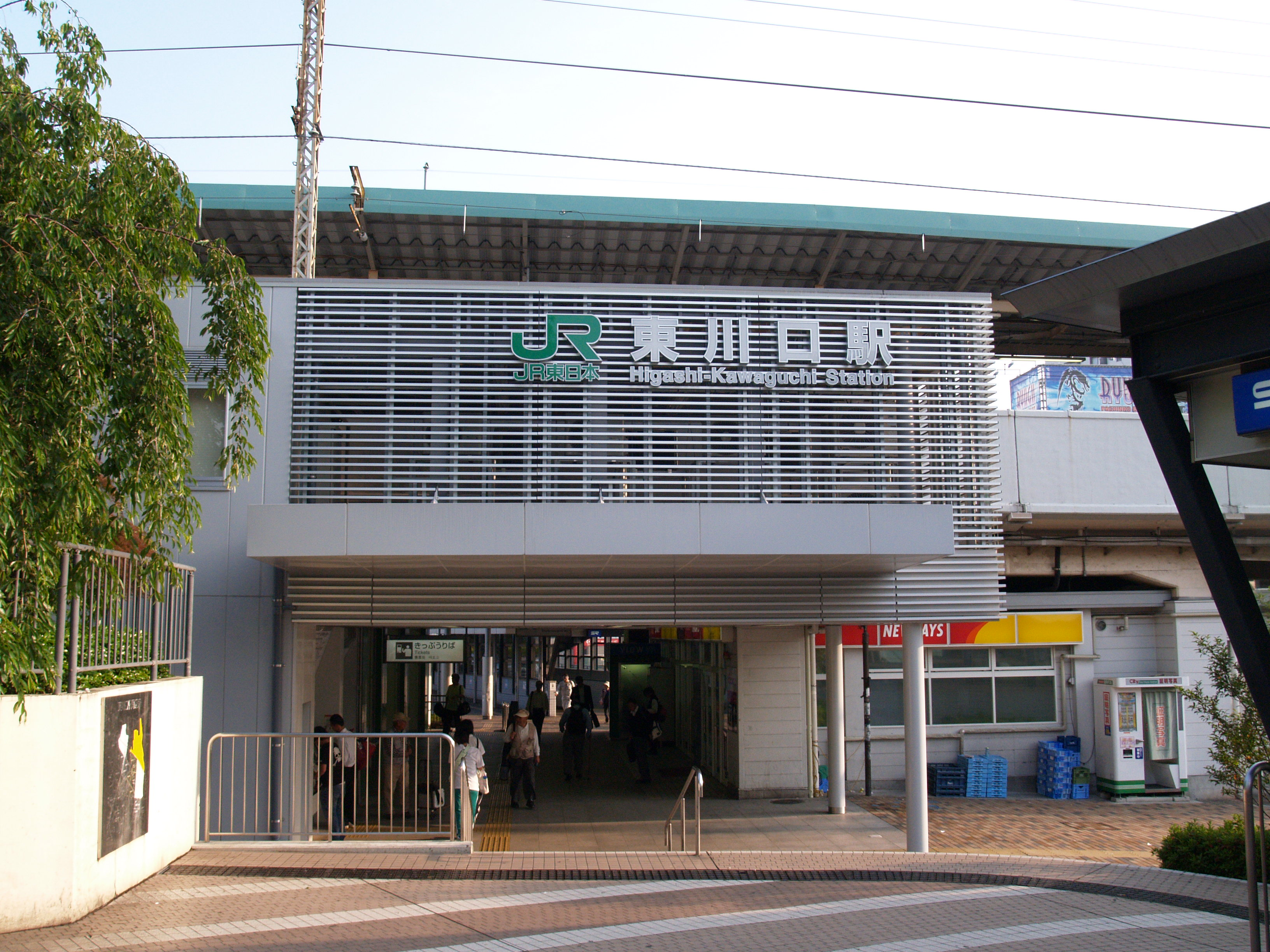
- JR East Higashi-Kawaguchi Station south entrance, June 2012

General information
- Location: 1 Tozuka, Kawaguchi-shi, Saitama-ken （埼玉県川口市戸塚1丁目） Japan
- System: JR East station
- Operator: JR East
- Line: Musashino Line
- Distance: 68.0 km (42.3 mi) from Tsurumi
- Platforms: 1 island platform
- Tracks: 2
- Connections: Elevated

Other information
- Status: Staffed ( "Midori no Madoguchi" )
- Station code: JM23

History
- Opened: 1 April 1973; 53 years ago

Passengers
- FY2019: 36,918 daily

Services
Preceding station	JR East	Following station
Higashi-Urawa JM24 towards Ōmiya	Shimōsa	Minami-Koshigaya JM22 towards Kaihimmakuhari
Higashi-Urawa JM24 towards Fuchūhommachi	Musashino Line	Minami-Koshigaya JM22 towards Kaihimmakuhari or Tokyo
Location

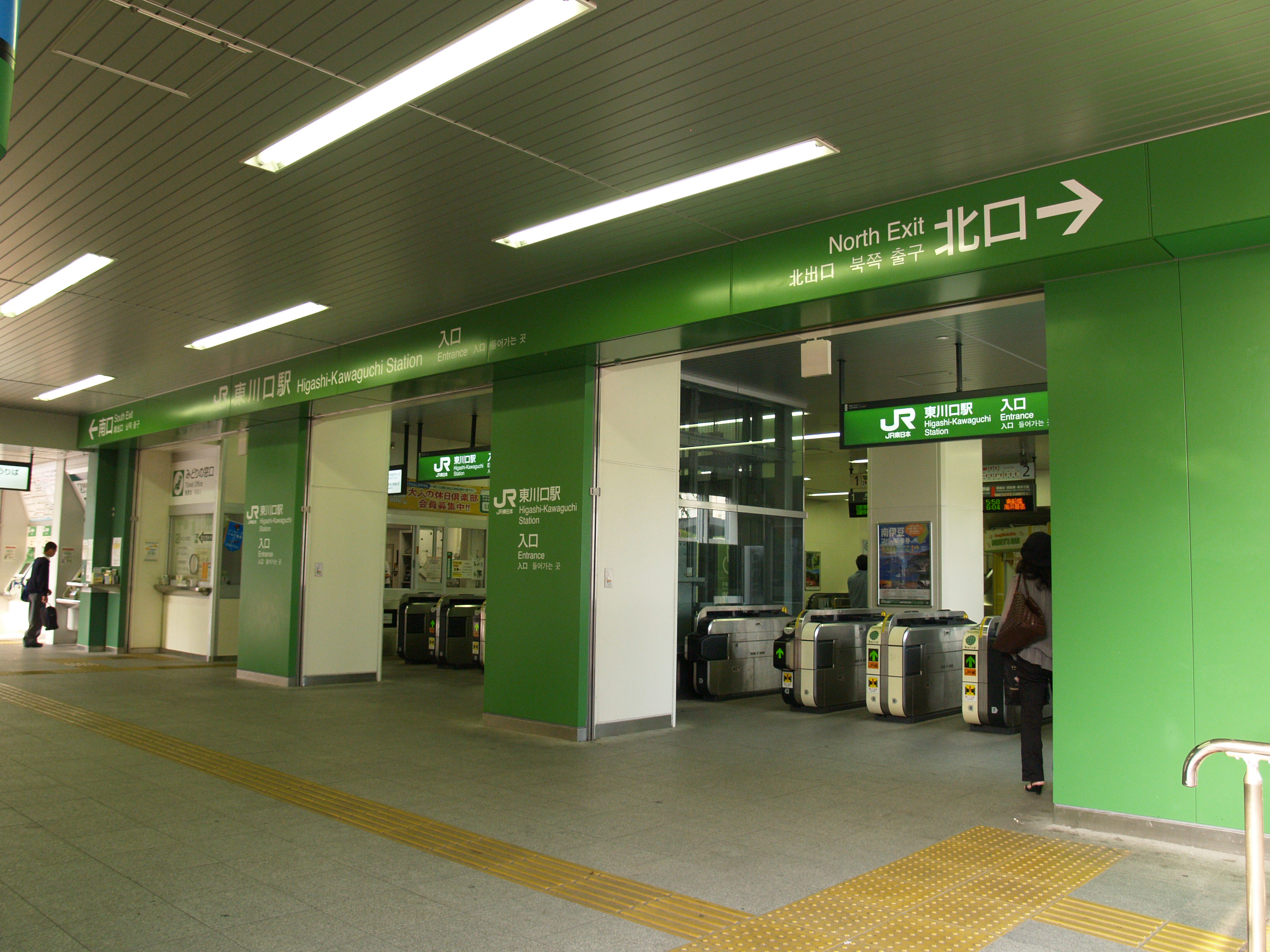
The ticket barriers, June 2012

=== Platforms ===
1	Musashino Line	for Minami-Urawa, Nishi-Kokubunji, and Fuchūhommachi
2	Musashino Line	for Minami-Koshigaya, Shim-Matsudo, Nishi-Funabashi, Tokyo and Kaihimmakuhari

=== Facilities ===
The station has a "Midori no Madoguchi" staffed ticket office.

== Saitama Railway ==
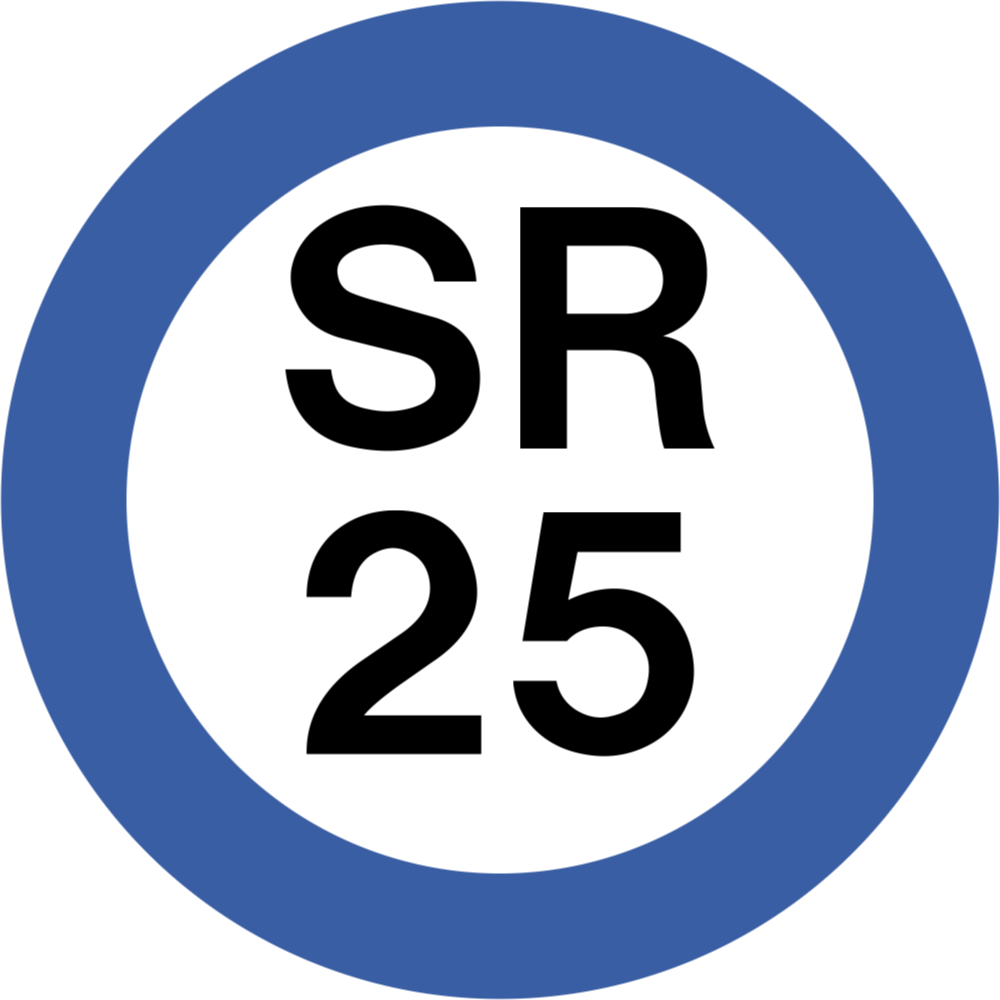
Higashi-kawaguchi Station 東川口駅

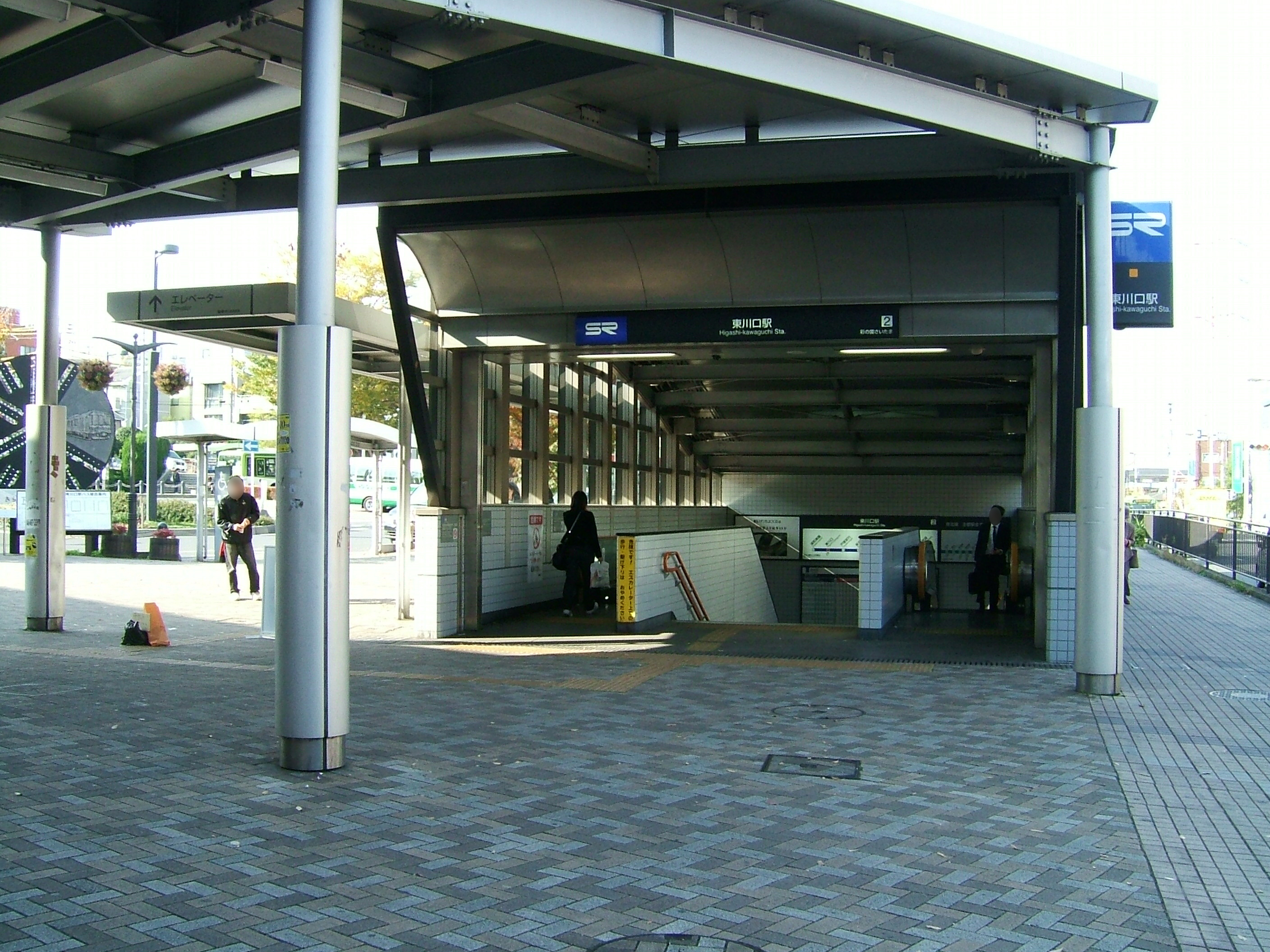
- Saitama Railway Higashi-kawaguchi Station No.2 entrance, November 2007

General information
- Location: 1-1-1 Higashi-Kawaguchi, Kawaguchi-shi, Saitama-ken （埼玉県川口市東川口1丁目1-1） Japan
- System: Saitama Railway Corporation station
- Operator: Saitama Rapid Railway
- Line: Saitama Railway Line
- Platforms: 1 island platform
- Tracks: 2

Construction
- Structure type: Underground

Other information
- Station code: SR25

History
- Opened: 28 March 2001; 25 years ago

Passengers
- FY2019: 16,934 daily

Services
Preceding station	Saitama Rapid Railway	Following station
Tozuka-angyō towards Akabane-iwabuchi	Saitama Railway Line	Urawa-misono Terminus
Location

The station has an underground island platform serving two tracks. The platforms are equipped with waist-height platform edge doors.

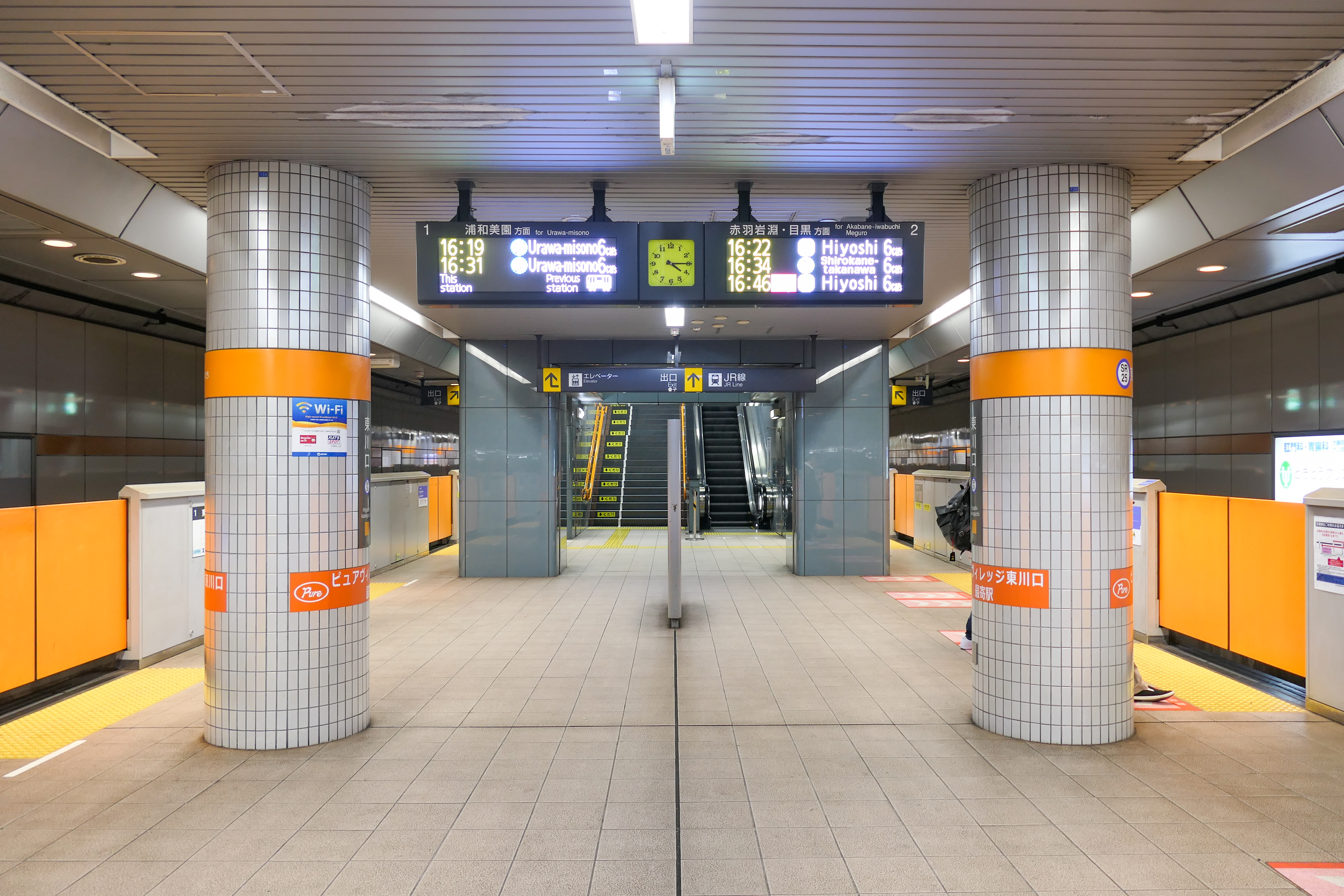
The platforms on 4 December 2022

=== Platforms ===
1	■ Saitama Rapid Railway Line	for Urawa-Misono
2	■ Saitama Rapid Railway Line	for Akabane-iwabuchi; Tokyo Metro Namboku Line for Meguro; Meguro Line for Hiyoshi; Tokyu Shin-Yokohama Line for Shin-Yokohama Station; Sotetsu Main Line for Ebina via the Tokyu/Sotetsu Shin-Yokohama Line

=== Facilities and accessibility ===
The station concourse and platforms have elevator access. Universal access toilets are available on the concourse level.

== Passenger statistics ==
In fiscal 2019, the JR East station was used by an average of 36,918 passengers daily (boarding passengers only). In fiscal 2019, the Saitama Railway station was used by an average of 16,934 passengers daily.

The JR East passenger figures for previous years are as shown below.

Fiscal year	Daily average
2000	24,474
2005	25,806
2010	29,263
2015	34,509

== History ==
The JR East station opened on April 1, 1973, as one of the original stations on the then-Japanese National Railways (JNR) Musashino Line. With the privatization of JNR on 1 April 1987, the station came under the control of JR East. The Saitama Rapid Railway Line opened on 28 March 2001.

== See also ==
- List of railway stations in Japan
