= Akenohoshi Women's Junior College =

- 明の星女子短期大学
- Type: Private
- Active: 1971–2003
- Location: Midori-ku, Saitama, Saitama, Japan

Akenohoshi Women's Junior College (明の星女子短期大学, Akenohoshi Joshi Tanki Daigaku) was a private junior college in Midori-ku, Saitama, Japan. Established in 1971, it closed in 2003. It concentrated on French and English foreign language studies. The school was affiliated with the Canadian Catholic Church.

== Academic departments ==
- English
- French

== See also ==
- Aomori Akenohoshi Junior College
