= Hiromi Mimura =

Japanese professional wrestler (born 1986)

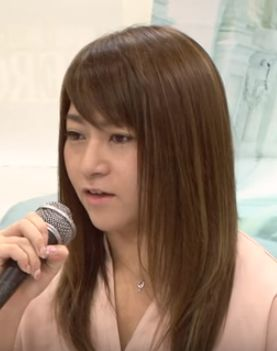
- Mimura in 2017

Personal information
- Born: June 24, 1986 (age 39) Kawaguchi, Saitama, Japan

Professional wrestling career
- Ring name: Hiromi Mimura
- Billed height: 1.48 m (4 ft 10 1/2 in)
- Billed weight: 48 kg (106 lb)
- Trained by: Fuka Kakimoto
- Debut: October 11, 2015
- Retired: March 28, 2018

Hiromi Mimura (美邑 弘海, Mimura Hiromi; born June 24, 1986) is a Japanese former professional wrestler and stage actress. She primarily wrestled for World Wonder Ring Stardom between 2015 and 2018, where she a former Artist of Stardom Champion.

== Professional wrestling career ==
Prior to her professional wrestling career, Mimura was a stage actress and a member of the theater group "Team Triple Y". She joined Stardom as a member of the 6th class. On November 5, she took the pro test with Momo Watanabe, and passed, but broke her left collarbone.

=== World Wonder Ring Stardom ===
Mimura's debut was announced for March 29, 2015, at Korakuen Hall, but was postponed after she was diagnosed with a condition that required further surgery. On October 11, she made her debut against Kris Wolf at the Korakuen Hall event. She performed a dance during her entrance, and performed a drop kick and La Magistral during the match, but lost to Wolf by a diving double knee. On November 8, Mimura teamed up with Starlight Kid, at the Goddesses of Stardom Tag League held at Shin-Kiba 1st Ring, and faced Momo Watanabe and Datura in the first round but lost. On December 6, she won her first match in the first round of the Stardom Rookie of the Year event held at Shinkiba, defeating Saori Anou, but lost to Jungle Kyona in the finals.

Mimura teamed up with Kairi Hojo and Konami to win the Artist of Stardom Championship on May 6, 2017, giving both Mimura and Konami their first ever championship. They lost the titles less than a month later to Queen's Quest. On March 28, 2018, Mimura had her retirement match at the Korakuen Hall event.

== Personal life ==
On October 18, 2019, Mimura announced the birth of her first child, a boy.

== Championships and accomplishments ==
- World Wonder Ring Stardom
  - Artist of Stardom Championship (1 time) – with Kairi Hojo and Konami (1)
  - Stardom Year-End Award (1 time)
    - Best Technique Award (2017)
