= Hatogaya, Saitama =

Hatogaya 鳩ヶ谷市
- Former municipality
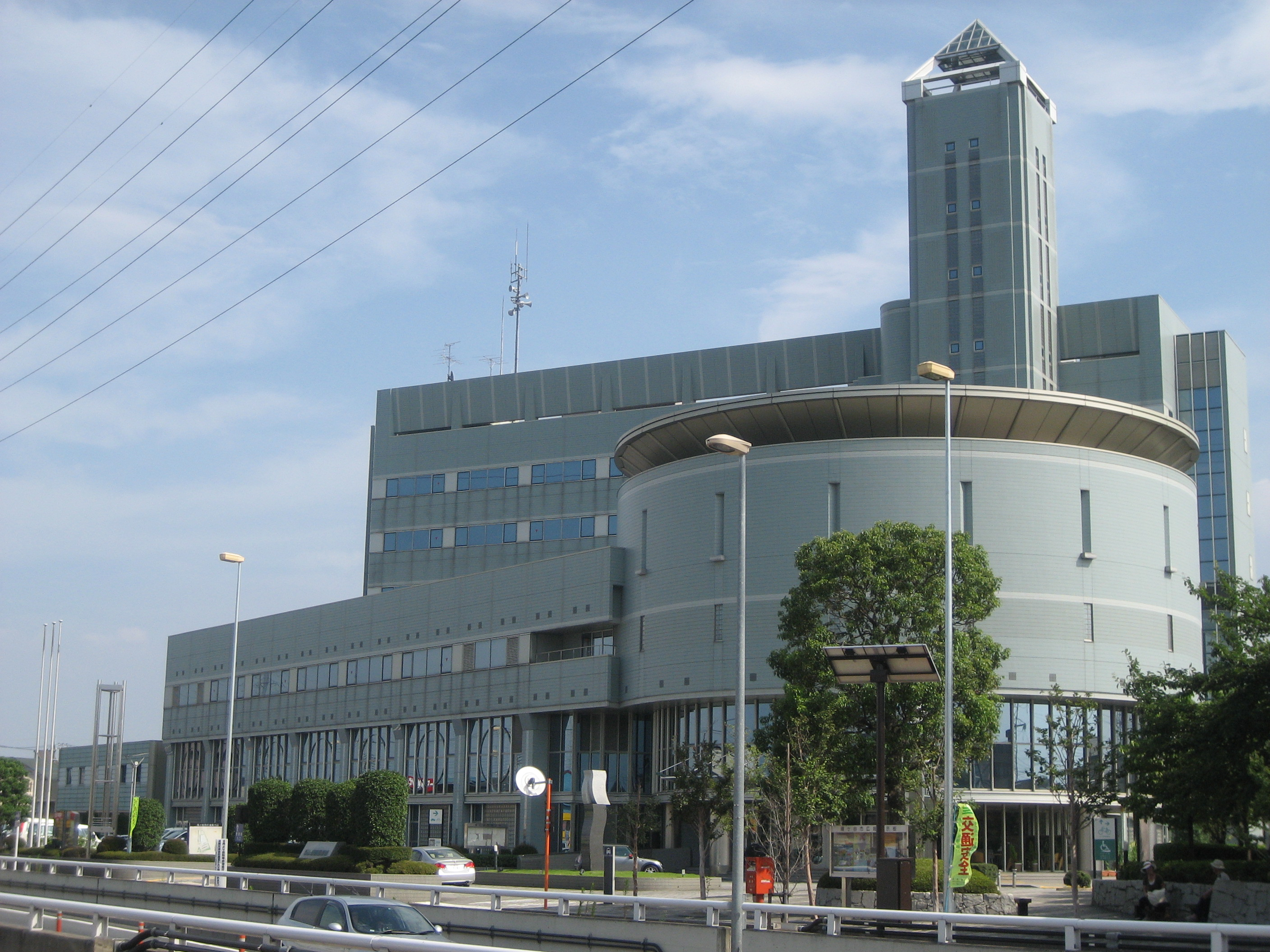
- Hatogaya city hall

- Flag Emblem

- Location of Hatogaya in Saitama Prefecture

- Location in Japan
- Coordinates: 35°50′N 139°44′E
- Country: Japan
- Region: Kantō
- Prefecture: Saitama Prefecture
- Merged: October 11, 2011 (now part of Kawaguchi)

Area
  - Total: 6.22 km^{2} (2.40 sq mi)

Population (April 1, 2011)
  - Total: 61,781
  - Density: 9,930/km^{2} (25,700/sq mi)
- Time zone: UTC+09:00 (JST)
- Symbols
- Bird: Oriental turtle dove
- Flower: Carnation
- Tree: Osmanthus

Hatogaya (鳩ヶ谷市, Hatogaya-shi) was a city located in Saitama Prefecture, Japan.

As of April 1, 2011, the city had an estimated population of 61,781, with 26,902 households, and a population density of 9,932.64 per km^{2}. The total area was 6.22 km^{2}, the second smallest among all cities in Japan.

The city was founded on March 1, 1967.

On October 11, 2011, Hatogaya was merged into the expanded city of Kawaguchi.
