= Kawaguchi Junior College =

Coordinates: 35.857630°N 139.713400°E

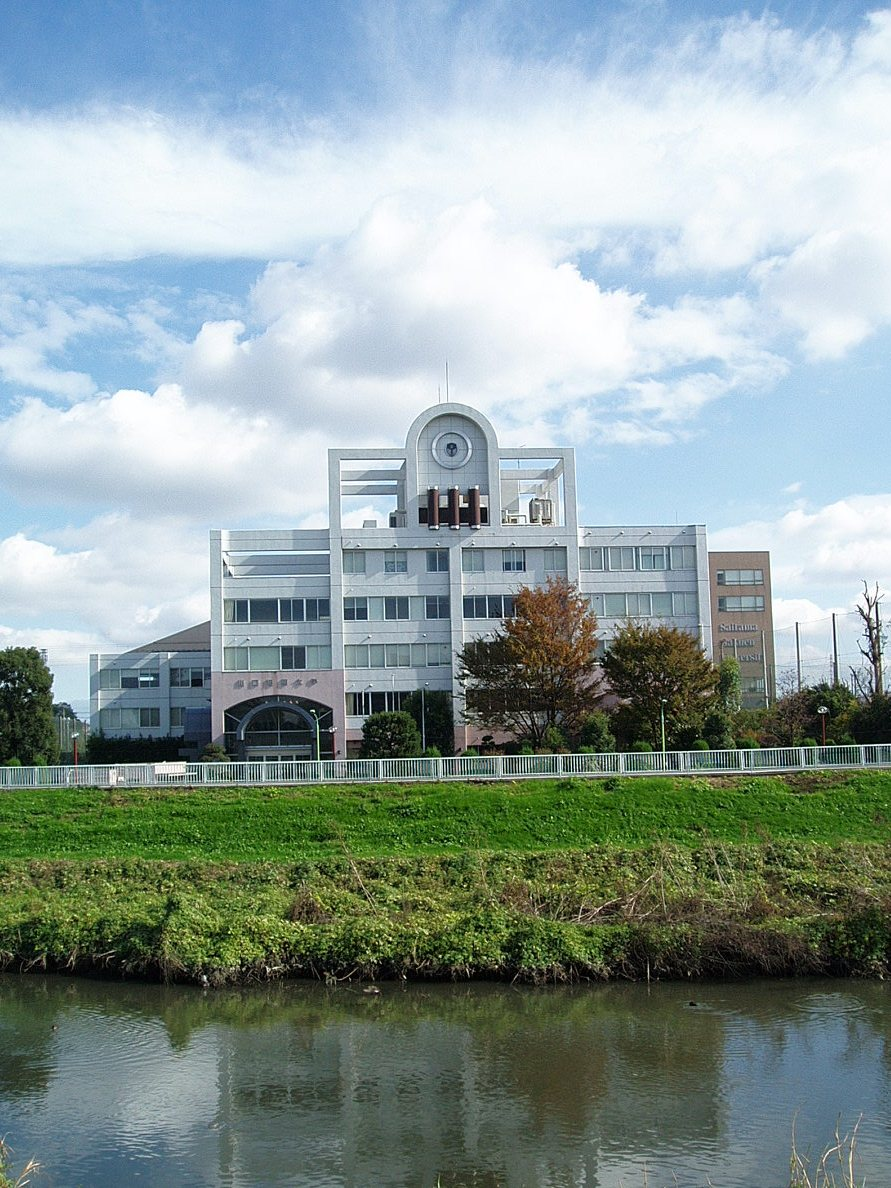
Bldg. #1 viewed across Shiba River

Kawaguchi Junior College (川口短期大学, Kawaguchi tanki daigaku) is a private junior college in Kawaguchi, Saitama, Japan. Founded in 1987 as a junior college with 144 female students, it became coeducational in 2000.
