= Shiba River =

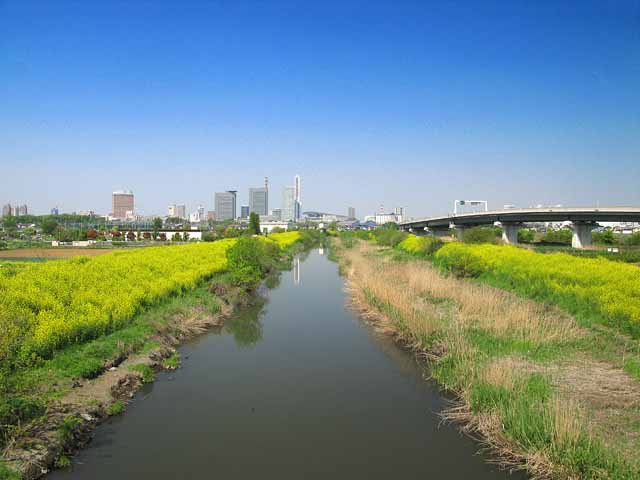

- Location within Japan

Physical characteristics
- Mouth: Arakawa River
  - location: Kawaguchi, Saitama
  - coordinates: 35°46′56″N 139°44′33″E

The Shiba River (芝川, Shiba-kawa) is a tributary of the Arakawa River that mainly runs through the eastern part of Saitama Prefecture, Japan. The river has Suehiro (末広) and Kobari-ryōke (小針領家) in Okegawa, Saitama as points of origin and flows through Ageo, Minuma, and Kawaguchi, and connects to the Arakawa River.

== History ==
Originally, the river flowed into a wetland at the current region of Minuma. In 1629, a civil engineering project by Ina Tadaharu (伊奈 忠治) created a reservoir and blocked the flow. In 1727, the reservoir levee was demolished to open up the area for creating rice paddies. In 1728, the lowest sections of the area were gouged to allow for the passage of water, which set the current position of the river.

== Water quality ==
The water quality of the river is poor, since it flows through urban areas. A report published in 2006 by the Ministry of the Environment indicates levels of dioxins and dioxin-like compounds above the standards set for public waterways. For this reason, recent years saw efforts to clear up the river.
