= Minami-Koshigaya Station =

Railway station in Koshigaya, Saitama Prefecture, Japan

JM22 Minami-Koshigaya Station 南越谷駅
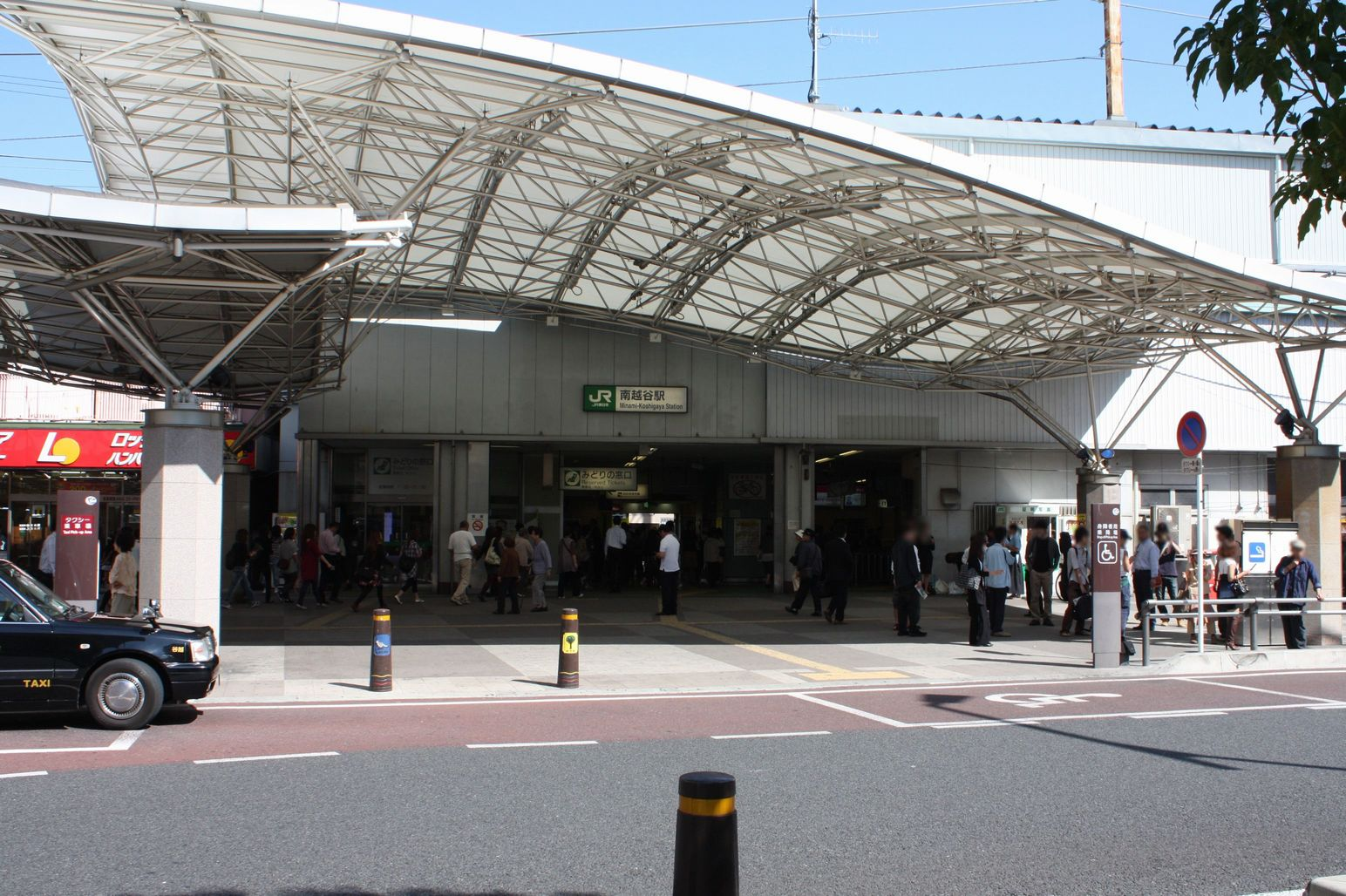
- Minami-Koshigaya Station south entrance in September 2009

General information
- Location: 1 Minami-Koshigaya, Koshigaya-shi, Saitama-ken 343-0845; Japan
- Coordinates: 35°52′33.9528″N 139°47′25.76″E
- Operator: JR East
- Line: Musashino Line
- Distance: 43.5 km from Fuchūhommachi
- Platforms: 2 side platforms
- Tracks: 2
- Connections: Shin-Koshigaya Station ( Tōbu Skytree Line); Bus terminal

Other information
- Status: Staffed (Midori no Madoguchi )
- Station code: JM22
- Website: Official website

History
- Opened: 1 April 1973

Passengers
- FY2019: 75,390 daily

Services
Preceding station	JR East	Following station
Higashi-Kawaguchi JM23 towards Ōmiya	Shimōsa	Koshigaya-Laketown JM21 towards Kaihimmakuhari
Higashi-Kawaguchi JM23 towards Fuchūhommachi	Musashino Line	Koshigaya-Laketown JM21 towards Kaihimmakuhari or Tokyo
Location
- Location within Saitama Prefecture

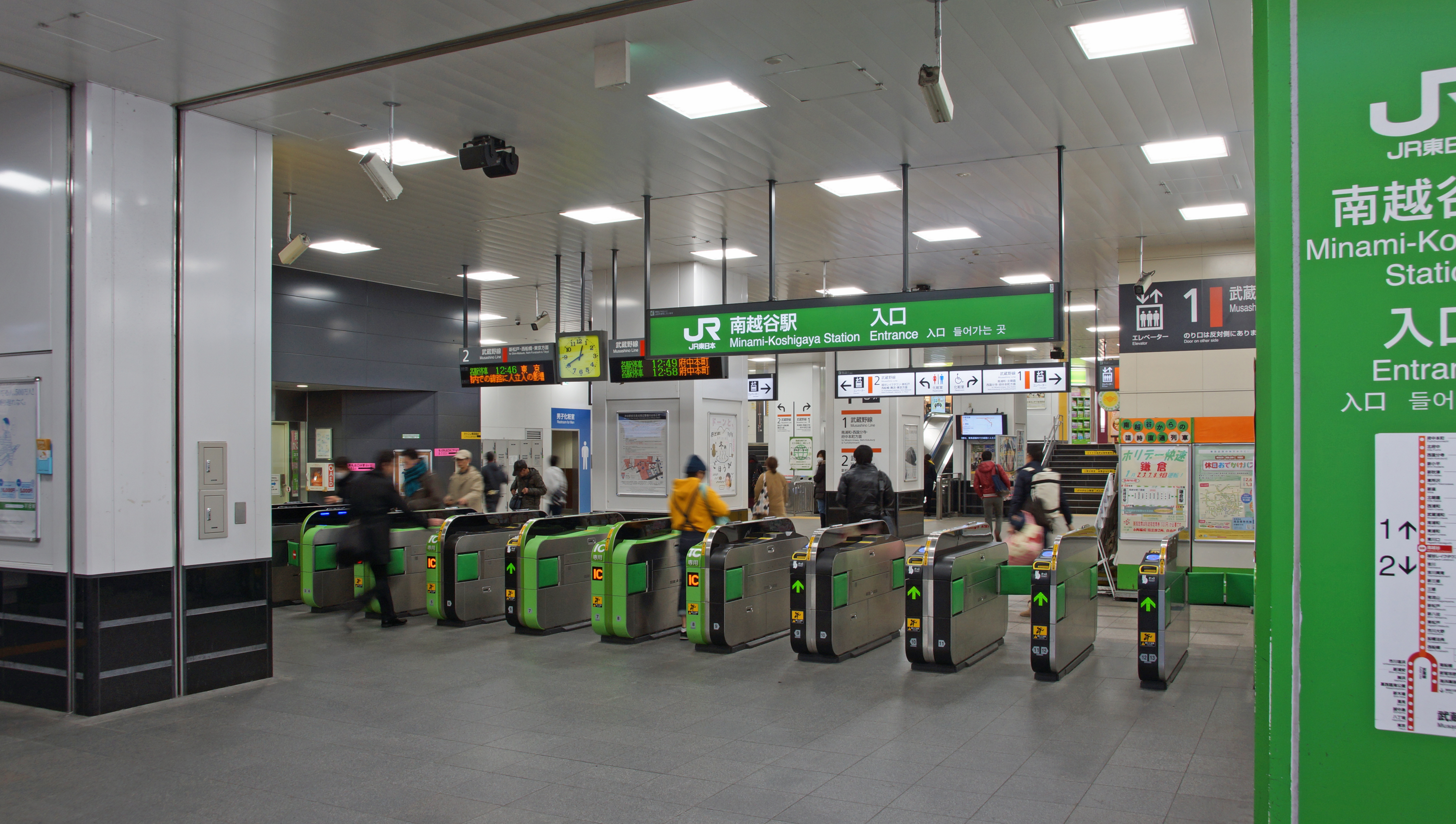
The entrance and ticket barriers in December 2016

Minami-Koshigaya Station (南越谷駅, Minami-Koshigaya-eki) is a passenger railway station located in the city of Koshigaya, Saitama, Japan, operated by East Japan Railway Company (JR East).

== Lines ==
Minami-Koshigaya Station is served by the orbital Musashino Line from Fuchūhommachi to Nishi-Funabashi and Tokyo, and lies 43.5 kilometers from Fuchūhommachi Station. It is also located adjacent to Shin-Koshigaya Station on the Tobu Skytree Line.

== Station layout ==
The elevated station consists of two side platforms serving two tracks. The station has a Midori no Madoguchi staffed ticket office.

=== Platforms ===
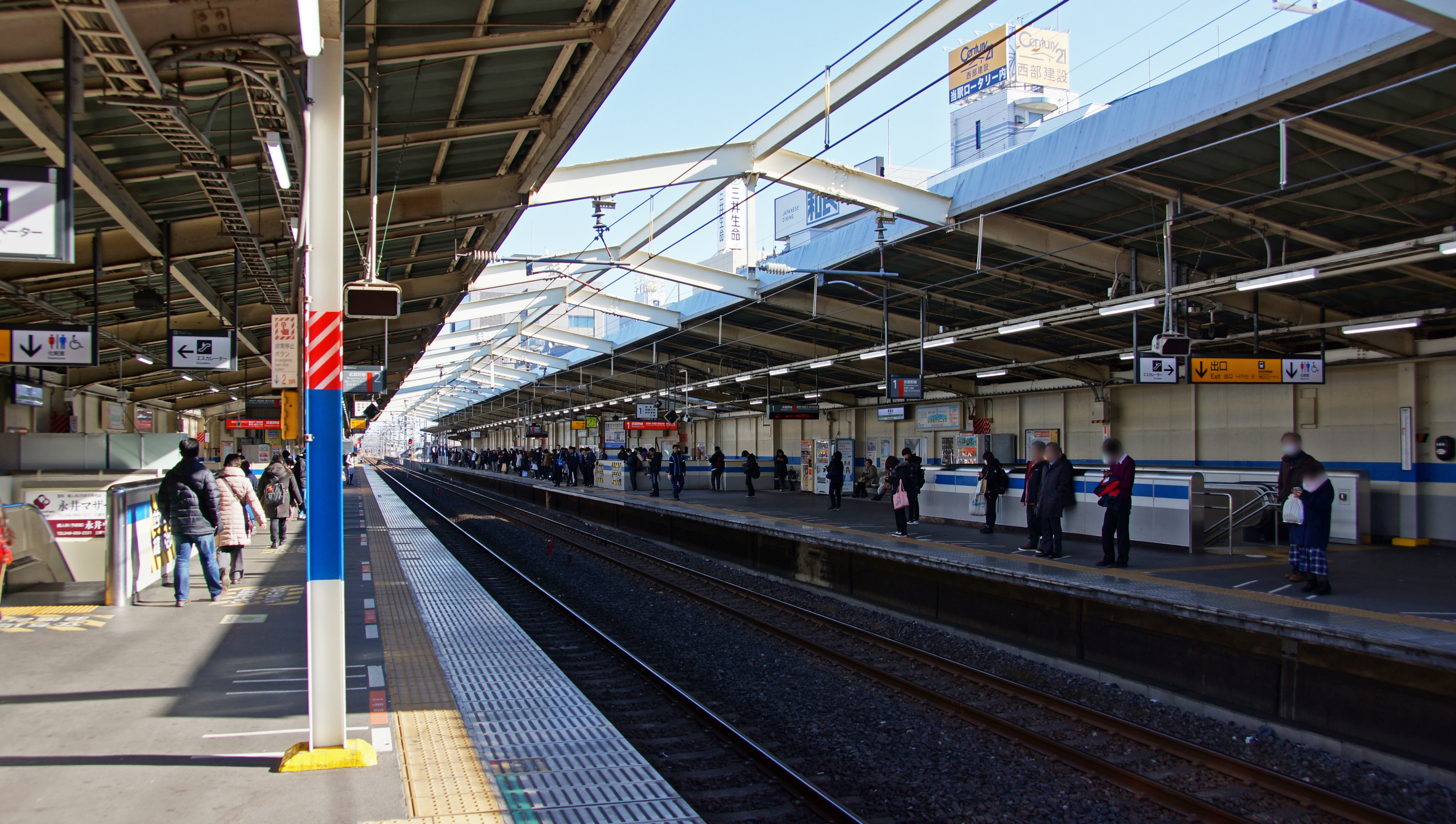
View of the platforms looking east (toward Nishi-Funabashi) from platform 2 in January 2012

1	Musashino Line	for Minami-Urawa, Musashi-Urawa, Nishi-Kokubunji, and Fuchūhommachi
2	Musashino Line	for Shim-Matsudo, Nishi-Funabashi, Tokyo, and Kaihimmakuhari

== History ==
The station opened on 1 April 1973. The adjacent Shin-Koshigaya Station opened on 23 July 1974, providing an interchange with the Tōbu Isesaki Line (now Tōbu Skytree Line).

== Passenger statistics ==
In fiscal 2019, the station was used by an average of 75,390 passengers daily (boarding passengers only). The daily average passenger figures (boarding passengers only) in previous years are as shown below.

Fiscal year	Daily average
2000	57,535
2005	60,712
2010	65,740
2015	73,285

== Surrounding area ==
- Shin-Koshigaya Station (Tōbu Skytree Line)
- Saitama Toho Junior College
- Koshigaya Freight Terminal
- Dokkyo Medical University Koshigaya Hospital

== See also ==
- List of railway stations
