= Minuma =

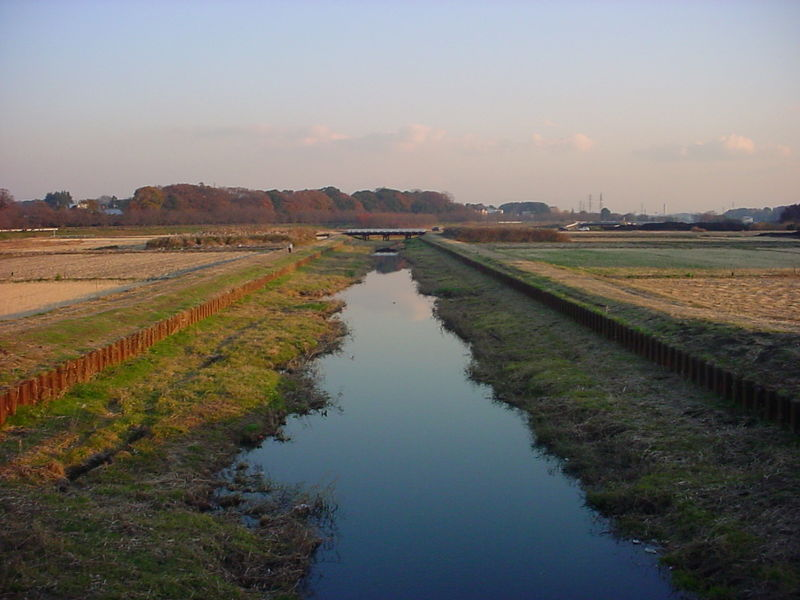
Minuma scenery

Minuma (見沼, Minuma) or Minuma Rice Paddies (見沼田んぼ, Minuma Tanbo) is an area of paddy fields and other agricultural fields along the Minuma Irrigational Canal in Saitama Prefecture, Japan. The area encompasses 1260 hectares and straddles across five wards of the city of Saitama (Kita-ku, Ōmiya-ku, Minuma-ku, Urawa-ku, and Midori-ku). Despite its close proximity to major urban areas such as Saitama-Shintoshin Station and Ōmiya Station, idyllic scenery consisting of paddy fields, farmlands, forests and rivers still remains.

== Geography ==
The area stands on the Shiba River Lowland, which is located inside of the Ōmiya Plateau in the central Kantō plain. The Shiba River and Katayagawa River constitute the region's major stream system.

== History ==
From the Jōmon to the early Edo period, the high sea level associated with the Holocene climatic optimum linked the region with Tokyo Bay and nearly two-thirds of the area occupied by the former city of Urawa was under water. This is supported by many middens found in the region which date back to the early Jōmon period. Subsequently, as the climate cooled down, the retracting shoreline left the region a countless number of marshlands and wetlands, resulting in the creation of Minuma.

Between the early Edo Period and the mid-Edo period, the area was converted into a reservoir by Ina Tadaharu (伊奈忠治) for irrigation. In 1629, the project began with constructing a levee between current Tsukishima in Saitama and Kizoro in the city of Kawaguchi. The structure was called Hatchōzutsumi (八丁堤), literally meaning eight chō levee, since the length of the levee was approximately eight chō (870 meters). The reservoir mounted to cover roughly 1200 hectares with the average depth of one meter.

The mid-Edo period to the Post-war period marked the time span during which the area was actively utilized for agriculture by draining the reservoir. In 1727, the reservoir levee was demolished and rice paddies were constructed on the reclaimed site. To ensure continual access to irrigational water in the region, an irrigation canal system supplied by the Tone River was introduced. Canals were dug roughly in a north–south direction along the two plateaus that sandwich the region.
