= Saitama Gakuen University =

Coordinates: 35°51′25″N 139°42′51″E

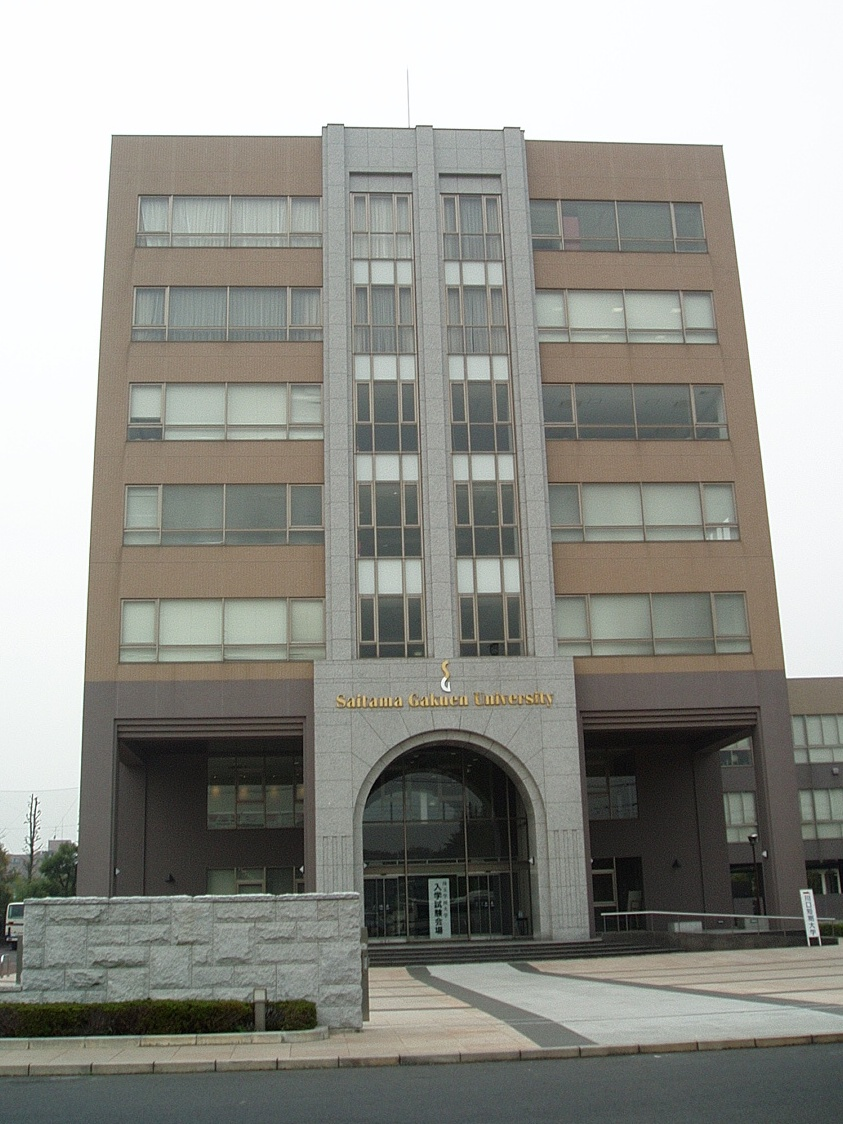
Bldg. #3

Saitama Gakuen University (埼玉学園大学, Saitama gakuen daigaku) is a private university in Kawaguchi, Saitama, Japan, established in 2001. The predecessor of the school was founded in 1972.
