= Aomori Akenohoshi Junior College =

Private women's junior college in Aomori, Aomori Prefecture, Japan

Coordinates: 40°46′43″N 140°52′55″E

- 青森明の星短期大学
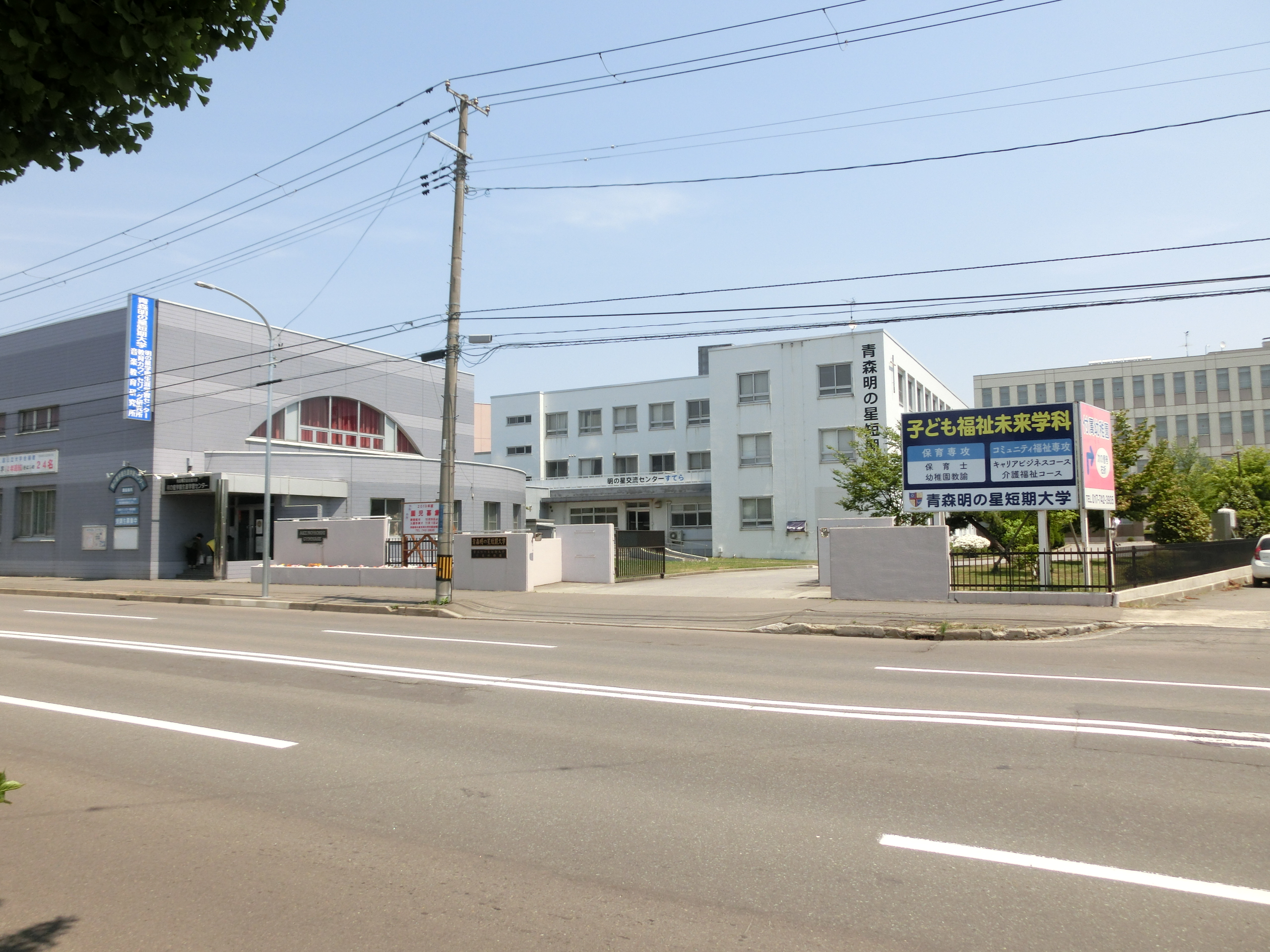
- Aomori Akenohoshi Junior College
- Motto: Florete Flores
- Type: Private
- Established: 1963, predecessor in 1937
- Affiliations: Roman Catholic
- Location: Aomori, Aomori, Japan
- Website: www.aomori-akenohoshi.ac.jp

Aomori Akenohoshi Junior College (青森明の星短期大学, Aomori Akenohoshi Tanki Daigaku) is a two-year private women's junior college in Aomori, Aomori Prefecture, Japan. The university was established in 1963, and is descended from an art school established in 1937. The school is affiliated with the Roman Catholic Church and was established by members of the Canadian Congregation of Sisters of the Assumption of the Blessed Virgin.

Prominent students include Mari Motohashi, an Olympic curler.
