= Midori-ku, Saitama =

Midori-ku, Saitama 緑区
- Ward
- Midori Ward
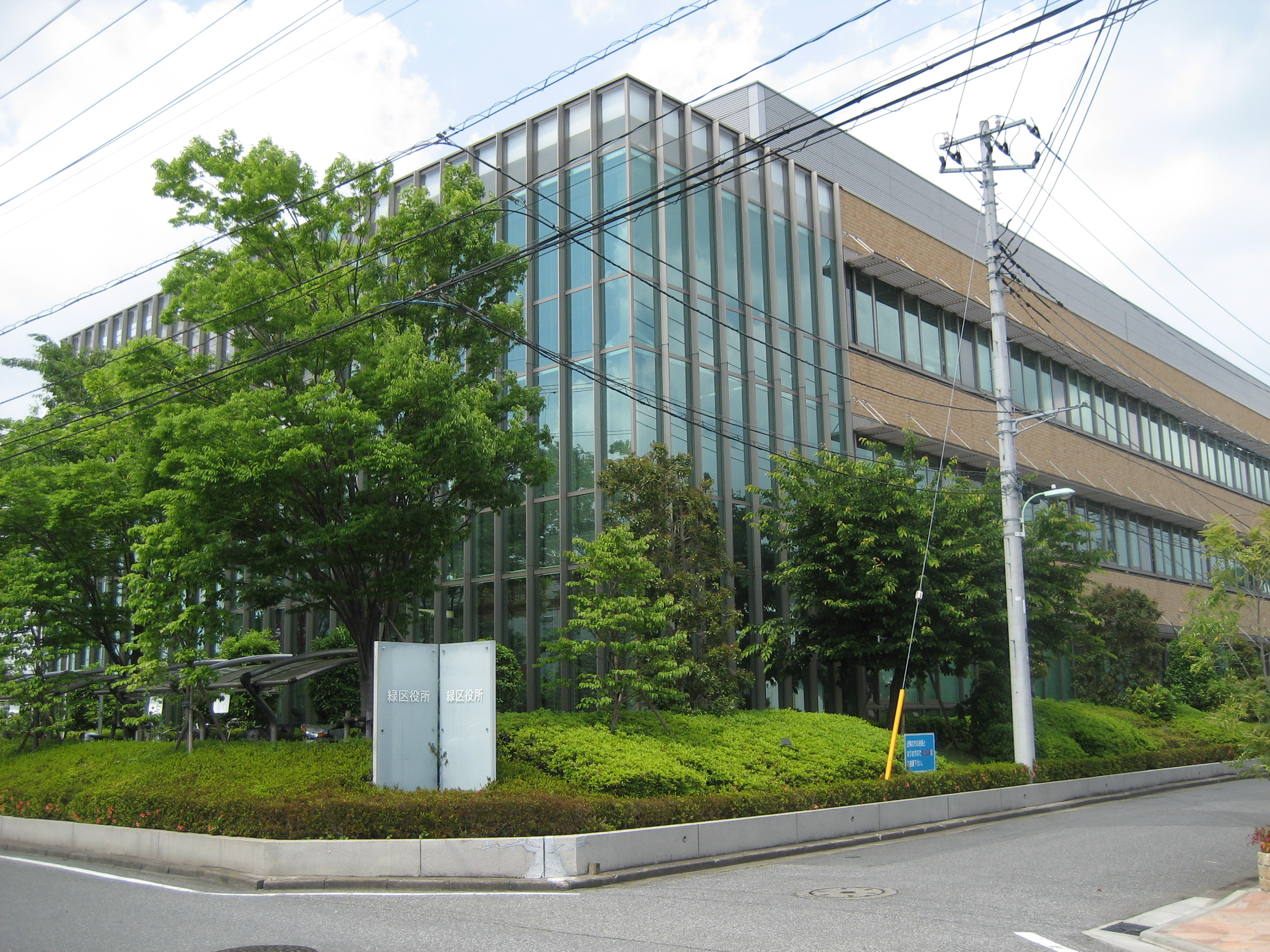
- Midori Ward Office, Saitama City

- Seal

- Location of Midori-ku in Saitama

- Coordinates: 35°52′15.9″N 139°41′2.7″E
- Country: Japan
- Region: Kantō
- Prefecture: Saitama
- City: Saitama

Area
  - Total: 26.44 km^{2} (10.21 sq mi)

Population (March 2021)
  - Total: 129,705
  - Density: 4,906/km^{2} (12,710/sq mi)
- Time zone: UTC+9 (Japan Standard Time)
- Tree: Sakura
- -Flower: Cornus florida
- -Bird: Egret
- Phone number: 048-835-3156
- Address: 975-1 Oji-Nakao Midori-ku, Saitama-shi, Saitama-ken 374-1111 338-0002
- Website: Official website

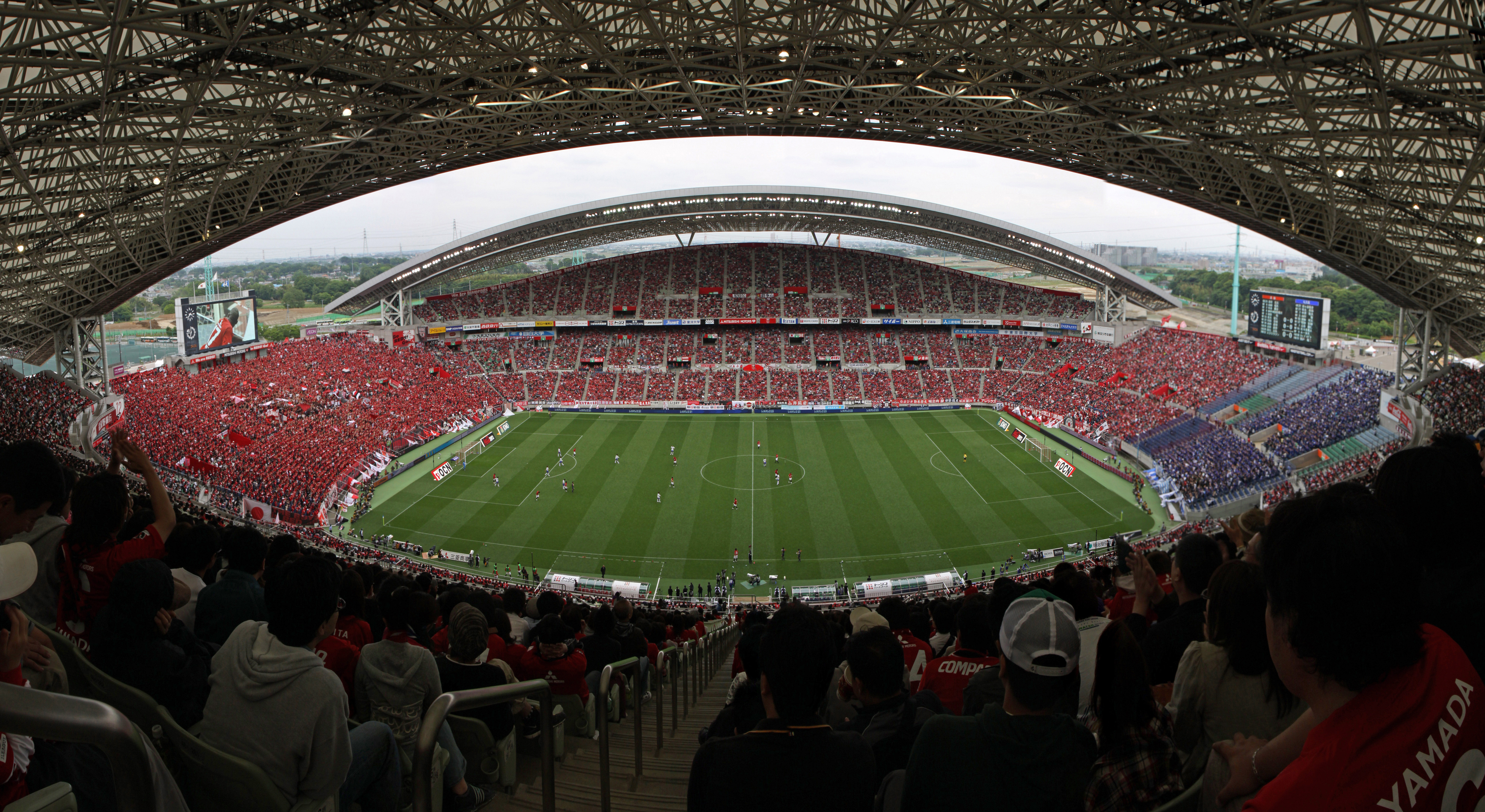
Saitama Stadium

Midori-ku (緑区, Midori-ku) is one of ten wards of the city of Saitama, in Saitama Prefecture, Japan, and is located in the southeastern part of the city. As of 1 March 2021, the ward had an estimated population of 129,705 and a population density of 4,900 persons per km^{2}. Its total area was 26.44 square kilometres (10.21 sq mi).

== Geography ==
A wide area of green farmland, Minuma Rice Paddies, forms the central part of the ward. The major river system includes the Shiba River, the Ayanose River, and the Minuma Irrigational Canal. In the southern section of the ward runs the Tōhoku Expressway.

=== Neighboring Municipalities ===
Saitama Prefecture

- Minuma-ku
- Minami-ku
- Urawa-ku
- Iwatsuki-ku
- Kawaguchi

== History ==
The first people who stayed permanently in this area are considered to have arrived approximately twenty five thousand years ago. Paleolithic archaeological sites found in the area include Matsuki (松木), Wadakita (和田北), Kitajukunishi (北宿西), and Mamiya Miyaushiro (間宮宮後). In the early modern period, the area witnessed large-scale civil engineering projects: the construction of the Minuma Reservoir (見沼溜井, Minuma Tamei), the demolition of the reservoir, and the creation of the Minuma Irrigational Canal (見沼代用水, Minumadai Yōsui). Daimon-shuku (大門宿) became one of the post stations of the Nikkō Onari Kaidō.

The villages of Tanida (谷田), Omagi (尾間木), Mimuro (三室), and Daimon (大門) were created within Kitaadachi District, Saitama with the establishment of the municipalities system on April 1, 1889. On April 1, 1932, Tanida was annexed by Urawa Town, which was elevated to city status on February 11, 1934. Omagi, Mimuro and Daimon merged to form the village of Misono on April 1, 1956. Misono was subsequently divided between Urawa and Kawaguchi on May 1, 1962. On May 1, 2001, the cities of Urawa, Yono and Ōmiya merged to form the new city of Saitama. When Saitama was proclaimed a designated city in 2003, the much area of corresponding to former villages of Tanida, Omagi, Mimuro and Daimon became Midori Ward.

== Education ==
- Urawa University
- Keio University School of Pharmacy
- Akenohoshi Women's Junior College
- Midori-ku has 10 elementary schools, six junior high schools, and three high schools, as well as two special education schools.

Municipal junior high schools:

- Harayama (原山中学校)
- Higashi Urawa (東浦和中学校)
- Mimuro (三室中学校)
- Misono (美園中学校)
- Misono Minami (美園南中学校)
- Omagi (尾間木中学校)

Municipal elementary schools:

- Daimon (大門小学校)
- Harayama (原山小学校)
- Mimuro (三室小学校)
- Misono (美園小学校)
- Misono Kita (美園北小学校)
- Nakao (中尾小学校)
- Noda (野田小学校)
- Omagi (尾間木小学校)
- Omaki (大牧小学校)
- Saido (道祖土小学校)
- Shibahara (芝原小学校)

== Transportation ==
=== Railway ===
JR East – Musashino Line

- Higashi-Urawa

Saitama Rapid Railway Line

- Urawa-Misono

=== Highway ===
- Tōhoku Expressway – Urawa Interchange
- Shuto Expressway Saitama Shintoshin Route
- National Route 122
- National Route 463

== Local attractions ==
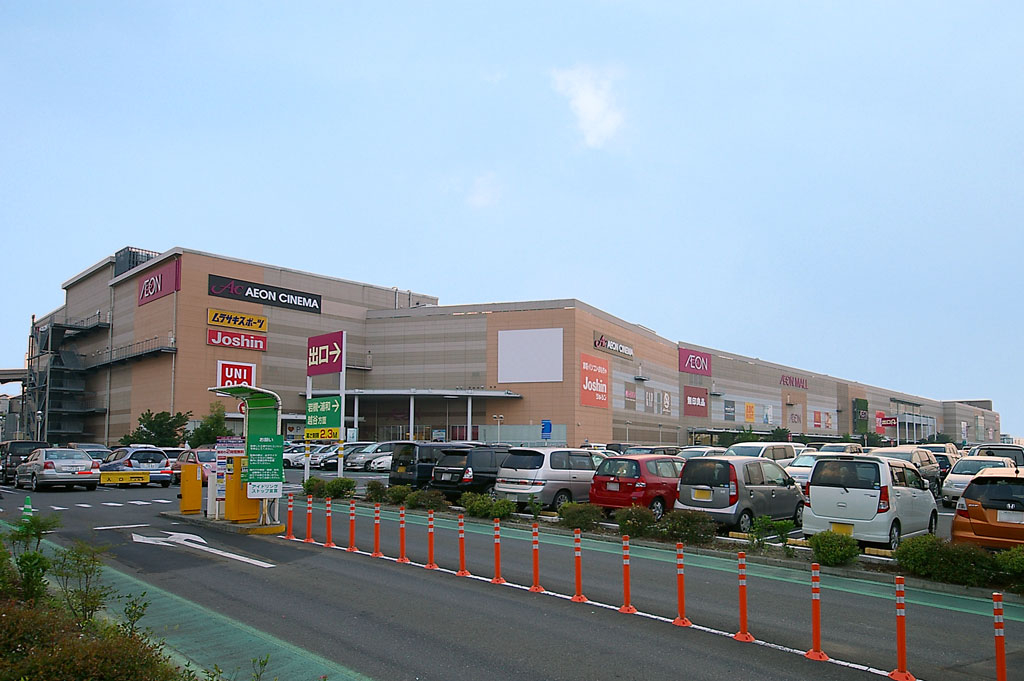
ÆON Urawa Misono shopping mall

- Saitama Stadium 2002
- ÆON Urawa Misono shopping mall
- Saitama Prefectural Urawa Museum
- Saitama Municipal Urawa Museum
