= Kawaguchi, Saitama =

Kawaguchi 川口市
- Core city
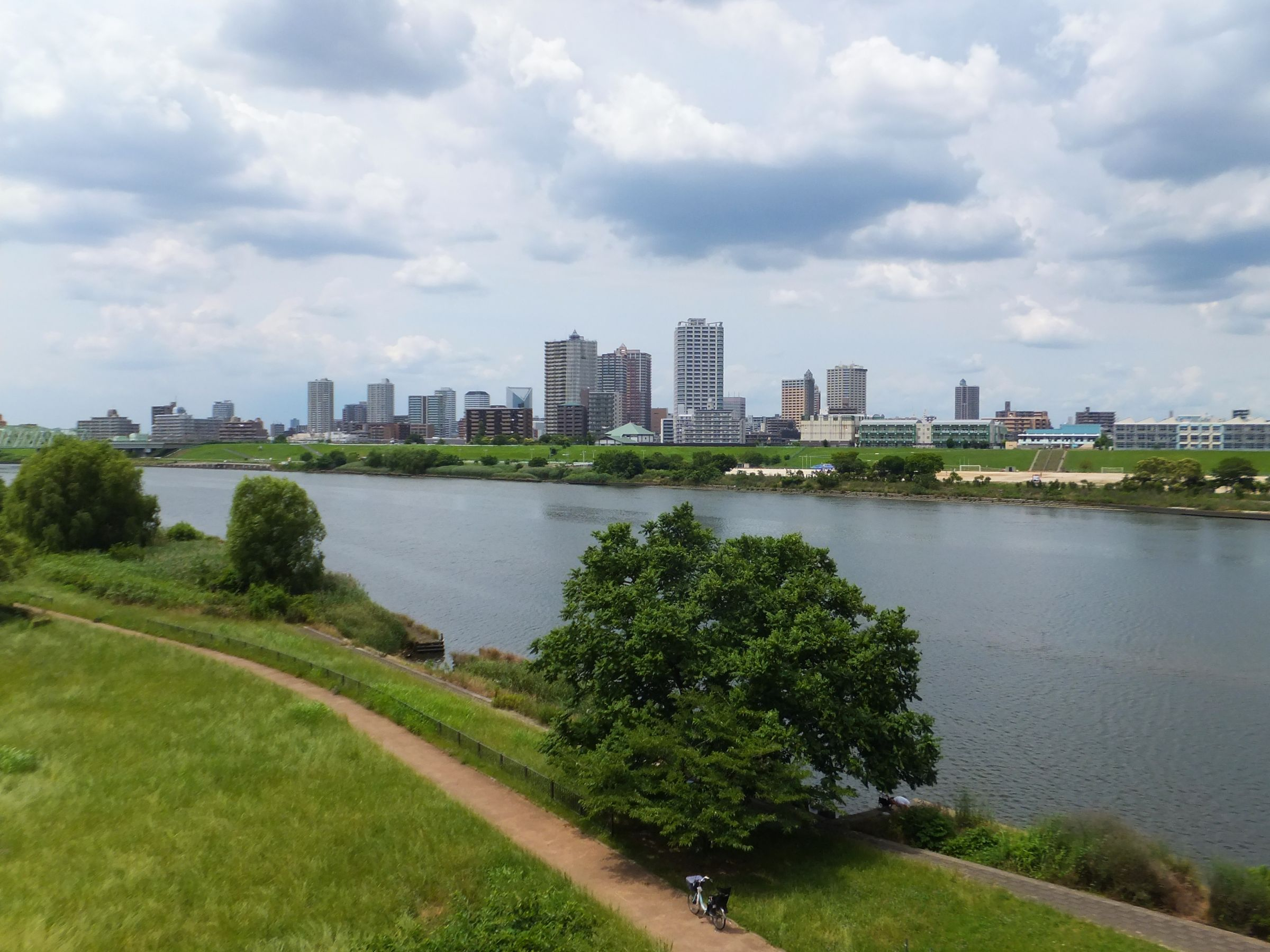
- View of downtown Kawaguchi

- Flag Seal

- Location of Kawaguchi in Saitama Prefecture

- Location within Japan Location within Kanto Area Location within Saitama Prefecture
- Coordinates: 35°48′27.7″N 139°43′26.8″E
- Country: Japan
- Region: Kantō
- Prefecture: Saitama
- First official recorded: 741 AD (official)
- Town settled: April 1, 1889
- City settled: April 1, 1933

Government
  - Mayor: Yuriko Okamura (岡村ゆり子) - from February 2026

Area
  - Total: 61.95 km^{2} (23.92 sq mi)

Population (1 April 2025)
  - Total: 595,011
  - Density: 9,605/km^{2} (24,880/sq mi)
- Time zone: UTC+9 (Japan Standard Time)
- Tree: Camellia sasanqua
- Flower: Lilium longiflorum
- Phone number: 048-258-1110
- Address: 2-1-1 Aoki, Kawaguchi-shi, Saitama-ken 332-0031
- Website: Official website

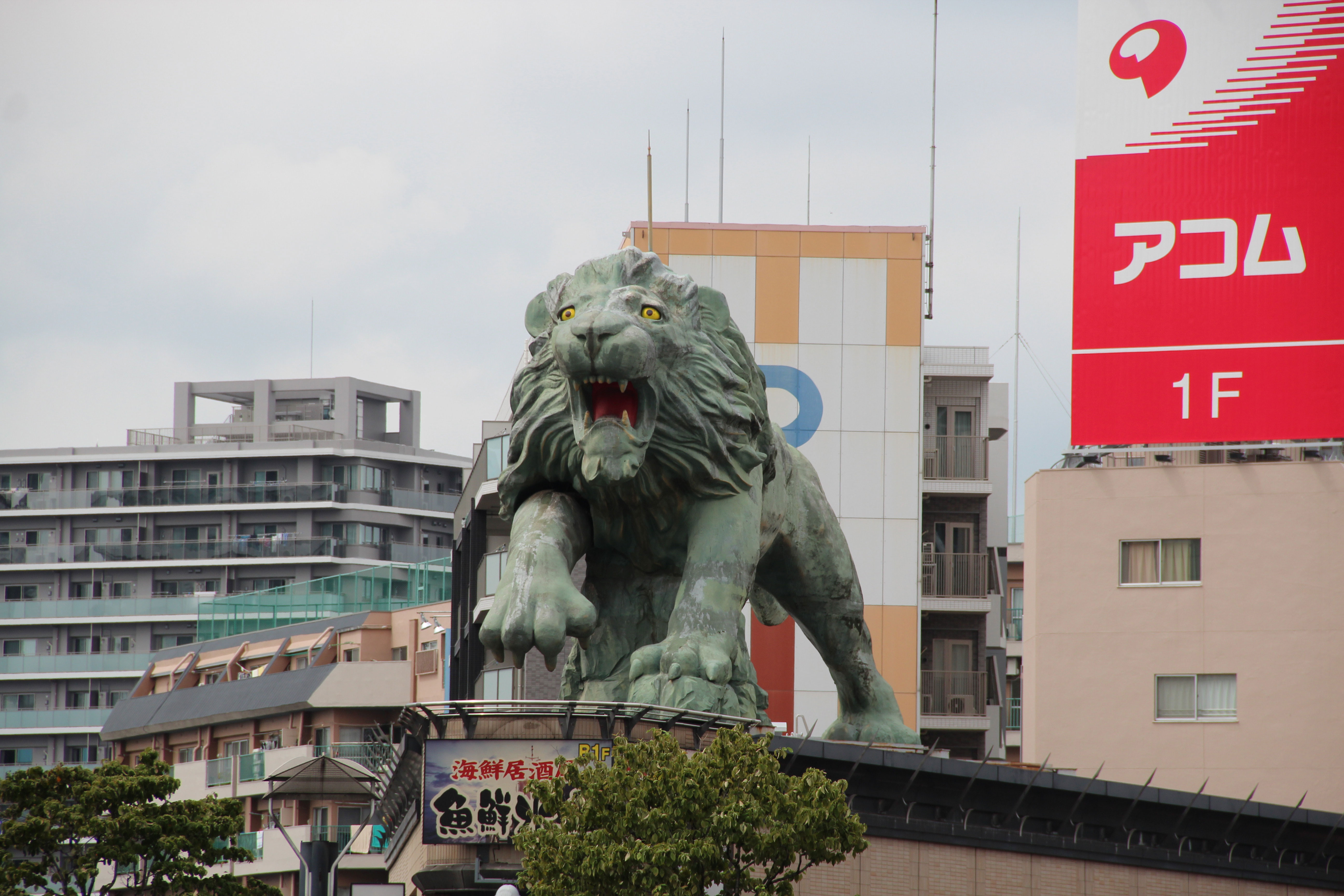
Lion statue near Kawaguchi Station

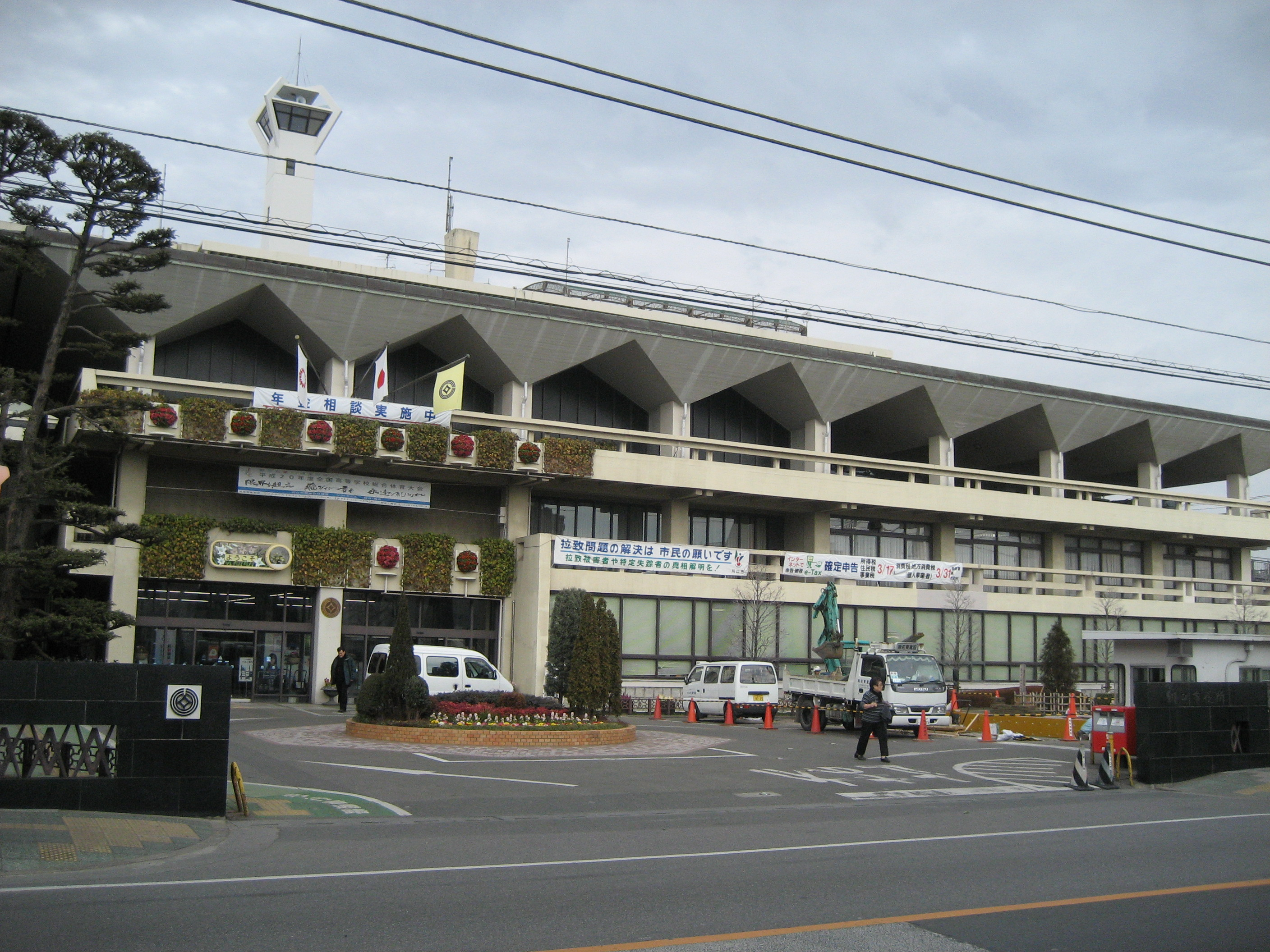
Kawaguchi City Hall

Kawaguchi (川口市, Kawaguchi-shi (Note: Japanese pronunciation: [ka.waꜜ.ɡɯ.tɕi, -ŋɯ.tɕi, ka.waꜜ.ɡɯ.tɕi̥ꜜ.ɕi, -ŋɯ.tɕi̥ꜜ.ɕi, -ɡɯꜜ.tɕi̥.ɕi, -ŋɯꜜ.tɕi̥.ɕi] (Note: The name of this city is pronounced like this with an accent. The common noun meaning "river mouth" is pronounced [ka.wa.ɡɯ.tɕi, -ŋɯ.tɕi] without an accent.))) is a city located in southeastern Saitama Prefecture, Japan. As of 1 April 2025, the city had an estimated population of 595,011 in 293,582 households and a population density of 9605 persons per km^{2}. The total area of the city is 61.95 square kilometres (23.92 sq mi). It is the Greater Tokyo Area's 8th most populated city (after passing Hachioji), and second largest in Saitama Prefecture, after eponymous Saitama.

== Geography ==
Kawaguchi is located near the center of the Kantō Plain in southwestern Saitama Prefecture in east-central Honshu, and is bordered by the Tokyo wards of Kita-ku and Adachi-ku to the south. The city area is mostly flat and mainly residential except for the Omiya tableland, which occupies part of the north and east area. The Arakawa River runs across the border with Kita-ku to the south.

=== Surrounding municipalities ===
Saitama Prefecture

- Koshigaya
- Saitama (Iwatsuki-ku, Midori-ku, Minami-ku)
- Sōka
- Toda
- Warabi

Tokyo Metropolis

- Adachi
- Kita

=== Climate ===
Kawaguchi has a humid subtropical climate (Köppen Cfa) characterized by warm summers and cool winters with minimal snowfall. The average annual temperature is approximately 14.8 °C, and the city receives about 1,482 mm of rainfall annually, with September as the wettest month. The temperatures are highest on average in August, at around 26.6 °C, and lowest in January, at around 3.2 °C.

== Demographics ==
As of 2010, the recorded population was 561,506. There had been a gradual increase in the number of non-Japanese residents living in the city because of the convenient location to Tokyo and relatively low rent. Now, the number of people from China is the largest, followed by Korea and Philippines.

Kawaguchi is a typical suburb city in the Tokyo metropolitan area, where the population greatly changes between daytime and nighttime due to commute to big cities, especially Tokyo. Its population growth rate declined in the mid-1990s, but recent apartment construction boom in the city has helped to increase the population growth rate again. The number of children continues to decrease in accordance with the declining number of births; in 2009, 4,735 live births were recorded in the city, a marked decrease from the 1971 peak of 7,932 births. By contrast, the rate of people aged 65 or over is increasing, and stood at approximately 18.5% as of 1 January 2010, although this is still below the national average.

In 2015, the recorded population was 578,112 residents.

Circa 2015, about 24,000 people in Kawaguchi were not Japanese citizens.

In June 2023, 41,471 people in Kawaguchi were not Japanese citizens; 23,637 people of them held Chinese citizenship.

In January 2025, about 48,000 people were not Japanese citizens, about twice the figure in 2015. Over 24,000 of the non-Japanese citizens were Chinese. 1,513 of them had Turkish nationality, and among those are ethnic Kurds.

Historical population
| Year | Pop. | ±% p.a. |
|---|---|---|
| 1933 | 45,573 | — |
| 1945 | 97,709 | +6.56% |
| 1955 | 130,545 | +2.94% |
| 1965 | 231,193 | +5.88% |
| 1975 | 335,864 | +3.81% |
| 1980 | 373,123 | +2.13% |
| 1990 | 433,262 | +1.51% |
| 2000 | 455,886 | +0.51% |
| 2010 | 500,598 | +0.94% |
| 2015 | 592,602 | +3.43% |
| 2020 | 594,274 | +0.06% |

=== Kurdish population ===
Beginning in the 1990s, due to Japan allowing nationals of Turkey a 90 day visa-free stay, ethnic Kurds began moving to Kawaguchi. By 2025 Kawaguchi and Warabi had the majority of ethnic Kurds in Japan.

== History ==
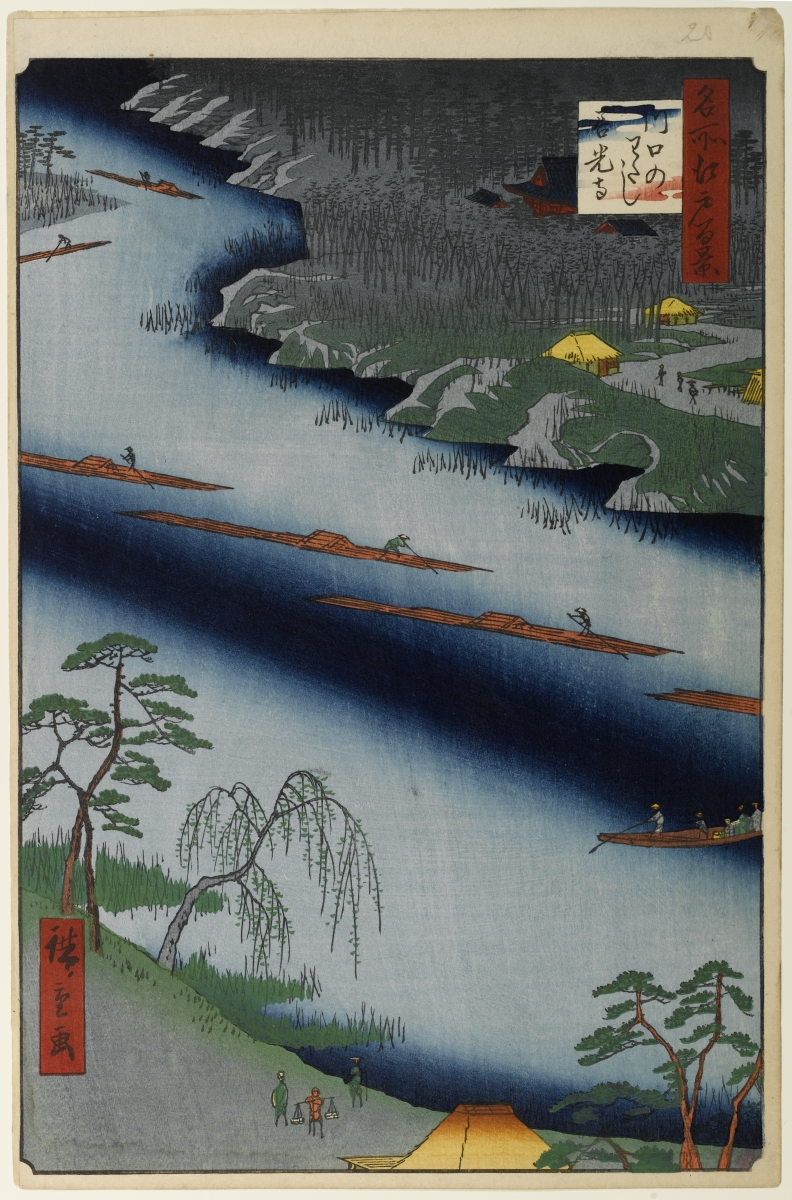
An ukiyo-e woodblock print from the One Hundred Famous Views of Edo series by Utagawa Hiroshige, depicting the crossing of the Arakawa River at Zenkō-ji Temple (1857)

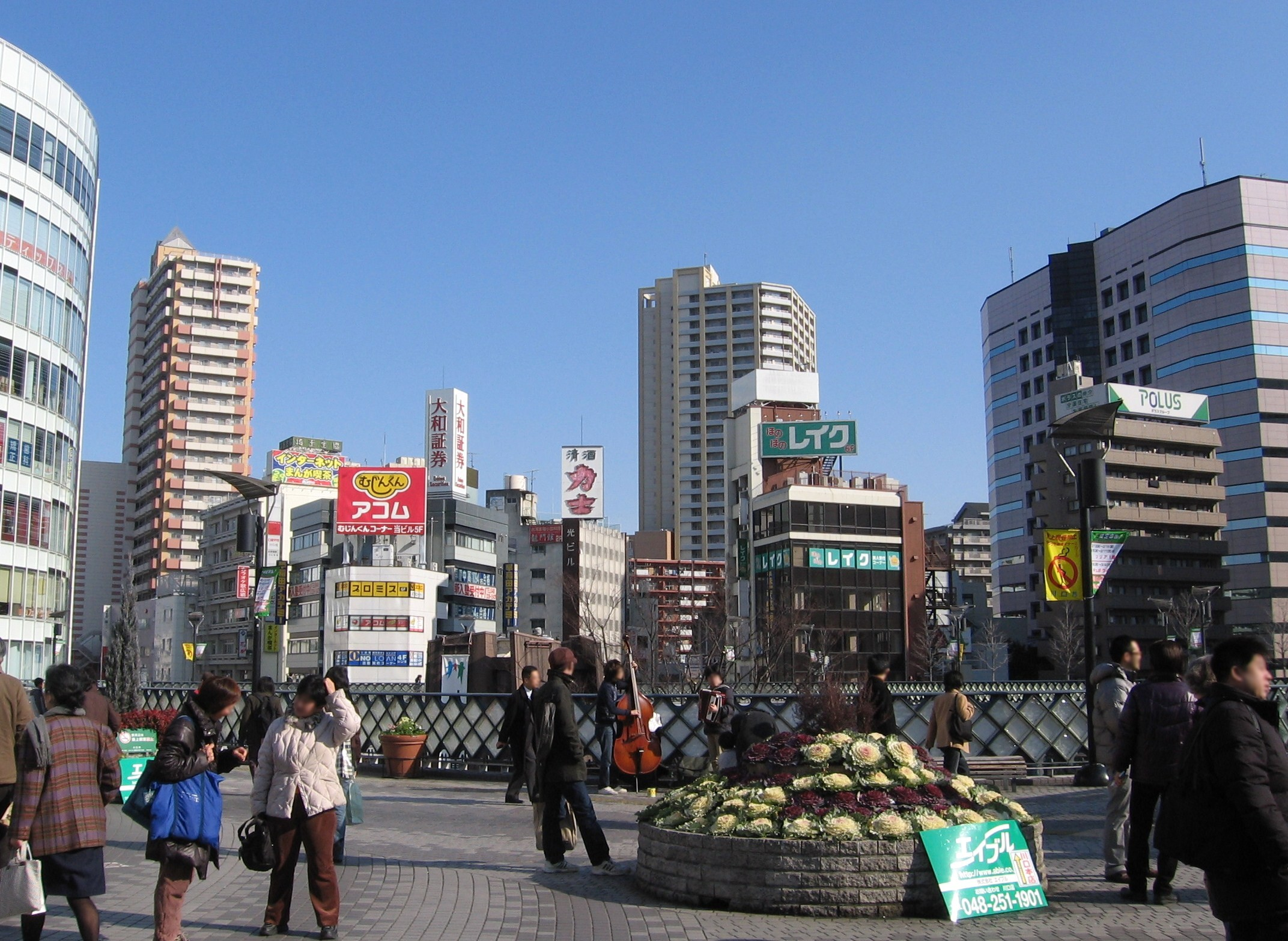
Honchō, Kawaguchi

After the last ice age, during early and middle Jōmon period, most of the area which is now Kawaguchi was under sea level except for the area which is now Omiya Tableland. Ancient peoples living in this area left several shell middens, in which shells, Jōmon pottery, and pit houses have been discovered by archaeologists. Many Kofun period barrows were also found in Kawaguchi, however many have also been destroyed by urban development. From the Heian period onwards, Kawaguchi was part of Musashi Province. The name "Kawaguchi" appears in the Kamakura period chronicle Gikeiki, but it is not proven that this name designated current area of Kawaguchi.

During the Edo period, Kawaguchi-juku developed as a post town and a local marketplace, with minimal industrial activity, on the Nikkō Onari Kaidō, a highway used by the Tokugawa shōgun and daimyō to visit Nikkō Tōshō-gū. Towards the Bakumatsu period and into the Meiji period, the demand for metal products increased. Because of proximity to Tokyo and convenient water transportation using Arakawa River, Kawaguchi became the center of metal casting industry, for which it has remained famous until modern times.

The town of Kawaguchi was established within Kitaadachi District, Saitama on 1 April 1889, with the establishment of the modern municipalities system.

In the early 20th century, the city experienced rapid growth in metal casting production. Kawaguchi was elevated to city status on 1 April 1933 by the merger of Kawaguchi with the neighboring villages of Aoki, Minami-Hirayanagi and Yokozone. The city expanded by annexing the town of Hatogaya and villages of Shiba, Kamine and Shingō in 1940. However, Hatogaya separated from Kawaguchi in 1948 in accordance with the results of a referendum. After World War II, Kawaguchi diversified its industrial base by introducing textile manufacturing, precision instrument production, and brewing industries.

Kawaguchi has experienced many disasters, including flood, earthquake, and war. The Arakawa River has inundated Kawaguchi countless times and ruined agriculture, which resulted in famines. Also, the 1923 Great Kantō earthquake damaged buildings in Kawaguchi, killing 99 people.

Currently, the population of Kawaguchi continues to increase, and many tall apartment buildings are being built around train stations. This is because many casting foundries moved to suburban industrial parks and the former sites were turned into residential areas.

On 1 April 2001, Kawaguchi was designated a special city, with increased local autonomy.

On 11 October 2011, Kawaguchi re-absorbed the city of Hatogaya.

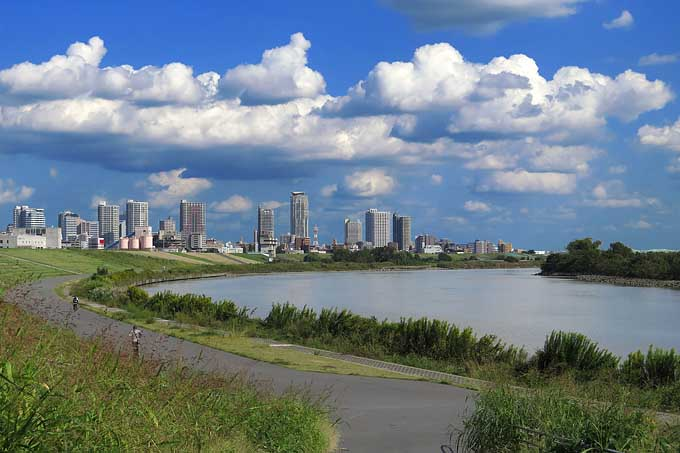
Arakawa River at Kawaguchi

On 16 August 2018, the city of Kawaguchi and the City of Findlay, Ohio signed a "Friendship City Agreement". The city of Findlay houses seven Japanese businesses such as Bridgestone, Hitachi Astemo, Nissin Brake, and more.

== Government ==
Kawaguchi has a mayor-council form of government with a directly elected mayor and a unicameral city council of 42 members. Kawaguchi contributes seven members to the Saitama Prefectural Assembly. In terms of national politics, the city is divided between Saitama 2nd district and Saitama 15th district of the lower house of the Diet of Japan.

=== Shibafuji ===
Shibafuji Elementary School's efforts to accommodate foreign students have gained attention from the Kawasaki Municipal Board of Education, which noted that the concentration of foreign students at this school is rare even across Japan. The municipal education board has supported the school's initiatives, recognizing the unique challenges and solutions involved in integrating a growing number of foreign students.

== Education ==
Authorized by the Tokyo Bureau of Immigration Services Agency of Japan

- SAI International Education Academy

=== Universities and colleges ===
- Saitama Gakuen University
- Kawaguchi Junior College
- Kawaguchi Art School of Waseda University

=== High schools ===
Saitama Prefectural Board of Education operates:

- Saitama Prefectural Kawaguchi High School
- Saitama Prefectural Kawaguchi Kita High School
- Saitama Prefectural Kawaguchi Technical High School
- Saitama Prefectural Kawaguchi Seiryo High School
- Saitama Prefectural Kawaguchi Higashi High School
- Saitama Prefectural Hatogaya High School

The Kawaguchi Municipal Board of Education operates:

- Kawaguchi Municipal High School

=== Junior high schools ===
(all managed by the city)

- Angyo Junior High School
- Angyo-higashi Junior High School
- Aoki Junior High School
- Haimatsu Junior High School
- Higashi Junior High School
- Kamiaoki Junior High School
- Kamine Junior High School
- Kishikawa Junior High School
- Kita Junior High School
- Koyaba Junior High School
- Minami Junior High School
- Motogo Junior High School
- Nakacho Junior High School
- Nishi Junior High School
- Ryoke Junior High School
- Sachinami Junior High School
- Shiba Junior High School
- Shiba-higashi Junior High School
- Shiba-nishi Junior High School
- Shibazono Junior High School
- Shiwasuda Junior High School
- Tozuka Junior High School
- Tozuka-nishi Junior High School
- Zaike Junior High School
- Hatogaya Junior High School
- Sato Junior High School
- Hachimangi Junior High School

=== Elementary schools ===
(all managed by the city)

- Angyo Elementary School
- Angyo-higashi Elementary School
- Aoki-kita Elementary School
- Aoki-chuo Elementary School
- Asahi-higashi Elementary School
- Asahi-nishi Elementary School
- Funato Elementary School
- Haramachi Elementary School
- Higashihongo Elementary School
- Higashiryoke Elementary School
- Honcho Elementary School
- Iinaka Elementary School
- Iizuka Elementary School
- Jirin Elementary School
- Kamiaoki Elementary School
- Kamiaoki-minami Elementary School
- Kamine Elementary School
- Kamine-higashi Elementary School
- Kizoro Elementary School
- Nakacho Elementary School
- Namiki Elementary School
- Negishi Elementary School
- Hatogaya Elementary School
- Sato Elementary School
- Sakuramachi Elementary School
- Tuji Elementary School
- Nakai Elementary School
- Minamihatogaya Elementary School
- Ryoke Elementary School
- Saiwaicho Elementary School
- Sashima Elementary School
- Shiba Elementary School
- Shiba-chuo Elementary School
- Shibafuji Elementary School
- Shiba-higashi Elementary School
- Shiba-hinotume Elementary School
- Shiba-minami Elementary School
- Shiba-nishi Elementary School
- Shingo Elementary School
- Shingo-higashi Elementary School
- Shingo-minami Elementary School
- Shiwasuda Elementary School
- Tozuka Elementary School
- Tozuka-ayase Elementary School
- Tozuka-higashi Elementary School
- Tozuka-kita Elementary School
- Tozuka-minami Elementary School
- Yanagisaki Elementary School
- Zaike Elementary School

=== Special schools ===
- Saitama Prefectural Kawaguchi Special Needs School
- Saitama Korean Kindergarten (埼玉朝鮮幼稚園) - North Korean school -- (Abolished on 31 March 2014 )

== Transportation ==
=== Railway ===
JR East – Keihin-Tohoku line

- Kawaguchi - Nishi-Kawaguchi

JR East – Musashino line

- Higashi-Kawaguchi

Saitama Rapid Railway Line

- Kawaguchi-motogō - Minami-hatogaya - Hatogaya - Araijuku - Tozuka-angyō - Higashi-Kawaguchi

=== Buses ===
Kawaguchi has a highly developed bus network, mainly operated by Kokusai Kogyo Bus. The east region of the city is relatively far from train stations, many people use buses to the nearest train stations. Some bus routes have over 20 bus services an hour in the morning.

==== Bus operators ====
- Kokusai Kogyo Bus
- Tobu Bus Central

=== Highway ===
- Tōhoku Expressway – Kawaguchi Junction
- Tokyo Gaikan Expressway – Kawaguchi-Nishi Interchange, Kawaguchi-Chūō Interchange, Kawaguchi Junction, Kawaguchi-Higashi Interchange
- Kawaguchi Route – Kawaguchi Junction, Araijuku, Angyō, Shingo, Higashi Ryoke
- National Route 122
- National Route 298

== Local attractions ==
=== Kawaguchi Green Centre ===
- The Kawaguchi Green Center is a large botanical garden featuring themed gardens, greenhouses, and ponds. It showcases seasonal flowers such as cherry blossoms in spring and vibrant autumn leaves later in the year. The park also has a small zoo with rabbits, goats, and birds, making it a popular family-friendly destination. Visitors can explore its walking paths, attend flower festivals, or participate in gardening workshops. The garden blends Japanese and Western landscaping styles, offering a picturesque retreat in every season.

=== Kawaguchi Shrine ===
- Kawaguchi Shrine is a historic Shinto shrine that has been a place of worship for centuries. It is dedicated to Ukanomitama-no-Mikoto, the deity of agriculture and prosperity. At the entrance, a large torii gate welcomes visitors to the sacred grounds. The shrine hosts various festivals throughout the year, including New Year's celebrations, where many people come to make their first prayers of the year. Traditional wooden buildings and stone lanterns enhance its cultural significance. Visitors can also purchase charms and amulets for good luck, health, and success.

=== Former Tanaka Family Residence ===
- A historic landmark from the Edo period, the Former Tanaka Family Residence provides insight into traditional Japanese architecture. Once home to a wealthy merchant family, the house features wooden structures, tatami-mat rooms, and sliding paper doors. It is surrounded by a meticulously maintained Japanese garden with carefully arranged stones and plants. The residence also includes storage buildings used to safeguard valuables. More recently, it serves as an educational site for those interested in Edo-period history and architecture.

=== Mitsuzoin Temple ===
- Mitsuzoin Temple is renowned for its early-blooming Angyo cherry trees, which blossom in February, much earlier than most cherry trees in Japan. These vibrant pink blossoms contrast beautifully with the temple's wooden buildings, making it a popular photography spot. The temple grounds also feature stone pathways, Buddhist statues, and gardens, providing a serene atmosphere for meditation and relaxation. Each year, the arrival of the cherry blossoms signals the coming of spring, attracting both locals and tourists.

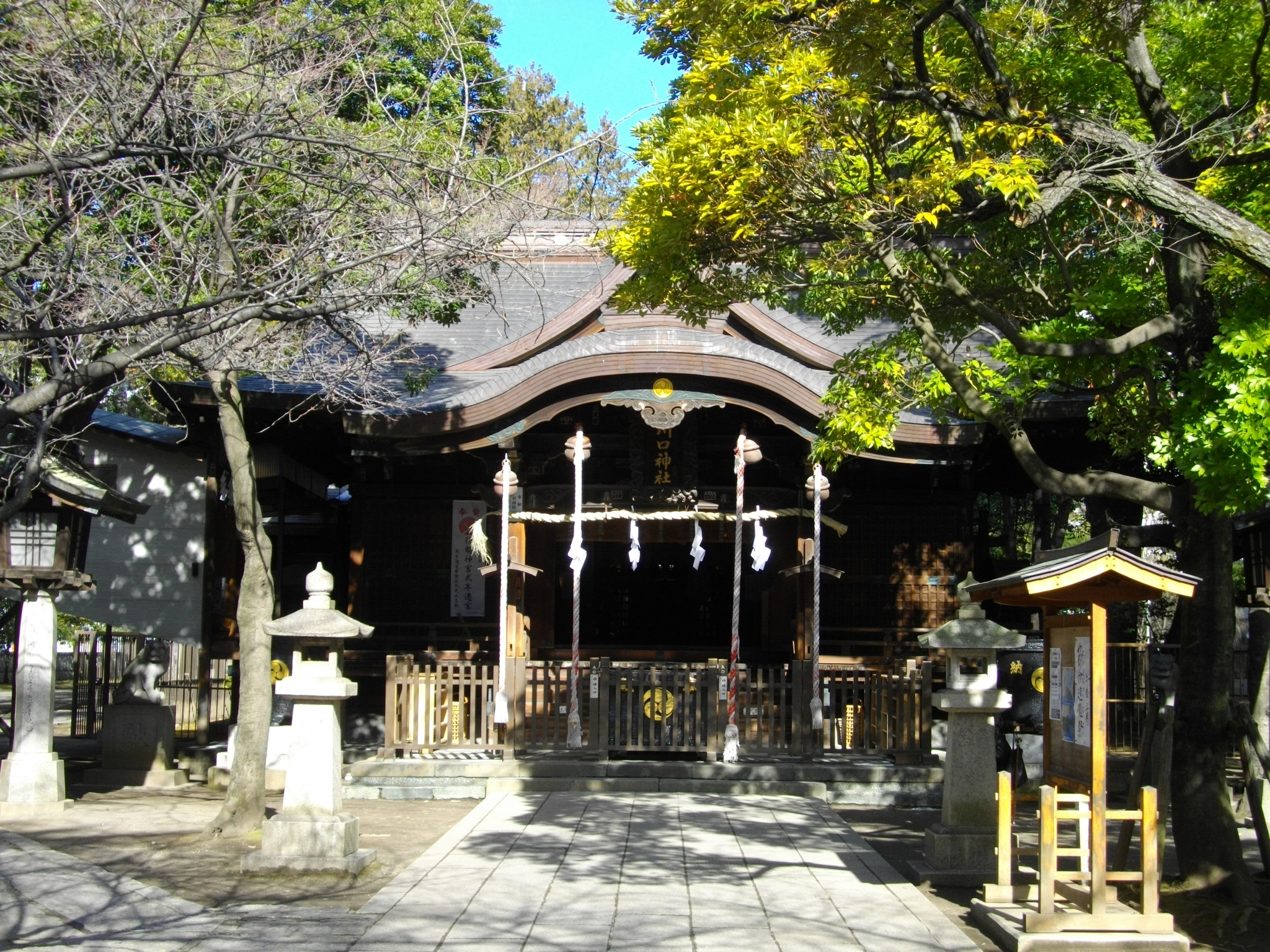
Kawaguchi Jinja

== Notable people from Kawaguchi ==
- Hiroyuki Endo, retired badminton player
- Hiromi Mimura, is a Japanese former professional wrestler and stage actress
- Nekojiru, Manga artist
- Yukio Ninagawa, stage director
- Kumiko Ohba, actress
- Yoshitaka Shindō, politician
- Nanae Takahashi, Professional wrestler
- Yukio Tomioka, politician
