= Akabane =

Akabane may refer to:

- Akabane virus
- Akabane, a neighborhood in Kita, Tokyo
- Akabane Station, a railway station in Kita, Tokyo, Japan
- Akabane Line, a railway line in Tokyo, Japan

== People with the surname ==
- Kenji Akabane (赤羽根 健治, born 1984), Japanese voice actor
- Shigeru Akabane (赤羽 茂, 1941–2011), better known as Little Tokyo, Japanese professional midget wrestler

=== Characters ===
- Karma Akabane (赤羽 業 (カルマ)), a character in the manga series Assassination Classroom
- Aiger Akabane (赤刃アイガ/Akaba Aiga in Japanese), a character in the anime Beyblade Burst Turbo
