= Paper Museum =

Museum in Tokyo, Japan

Coordinates: 35°45′00″N 139°44′19″E

- 紙の博物館
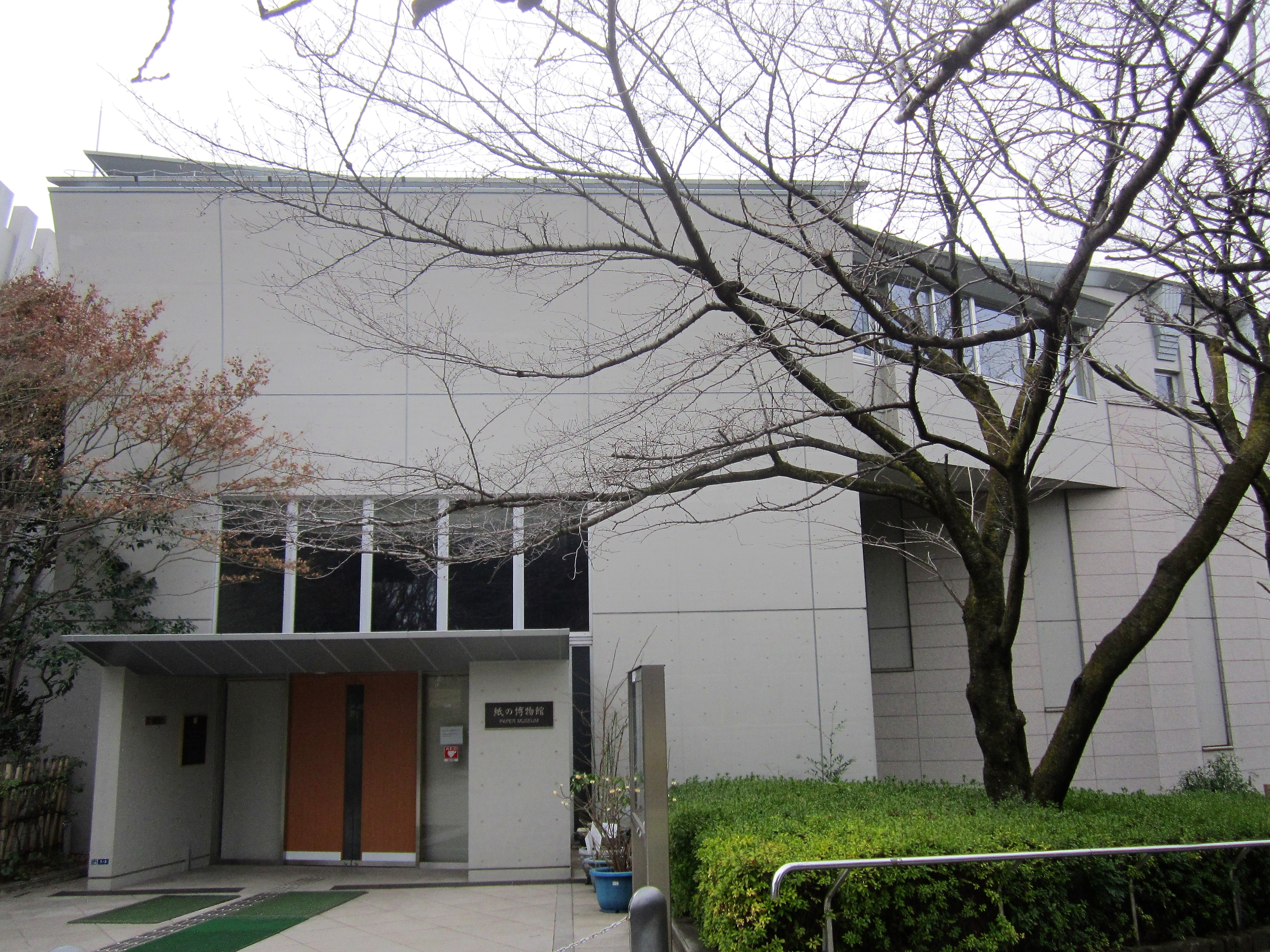
- Established: 1950
- Location: Kita, Tokyo, Japan
- Type: Paper museum
- Website: www.papermuseum.jp

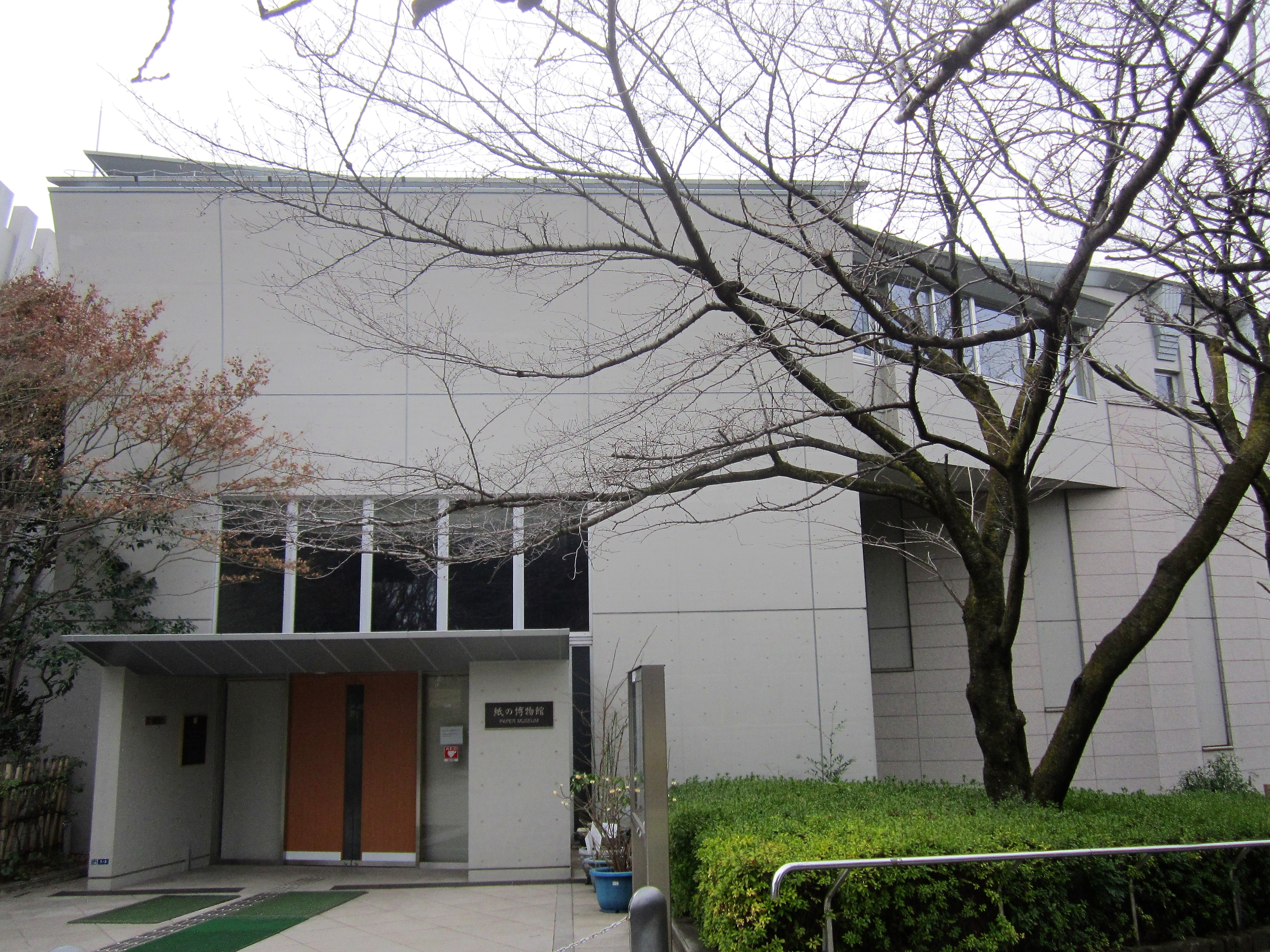
Paper Museum

The Paper Museum is a museum about paper in Asukayama Park in Kita-ku, Tokyo, Japan. Its area of focus is the production of Western paper in Japan, which was manufactured there as early as 1873.

It is operated by the Paper Museum Public Interest Incorporated Foundation.

== Museum exhibitions ==
The museum is in a four-story building. On the first floor, there are lecture halls and libraries. The entrance and first exhibition room are on the second floor, a second exhibition room is on the third floor, and third and fourth exhibition rooms are on the fourth floor.

The first exhibition room covers the modern paper industry, with explanation panels on pulp and paper raw materials and manufacturing processes. Actual manufacturing machines and models are displayed.

In the second exhibition room, there is a "paper classroom" where you can experience the properties of paper and exhibits about recycling used paper.

The third exhibition room covers the history of paper and the paper industry.

Special exhibitions are held in the fourth exhibition room.

== See also ==
- Ino Paper Museum
