= Jūjō Station (Tokyo) =

Railway station in Tokyo, Japan

Coordinates: 35.76025°N 139.7222°E

JA14 Jūjō Station 十条駅
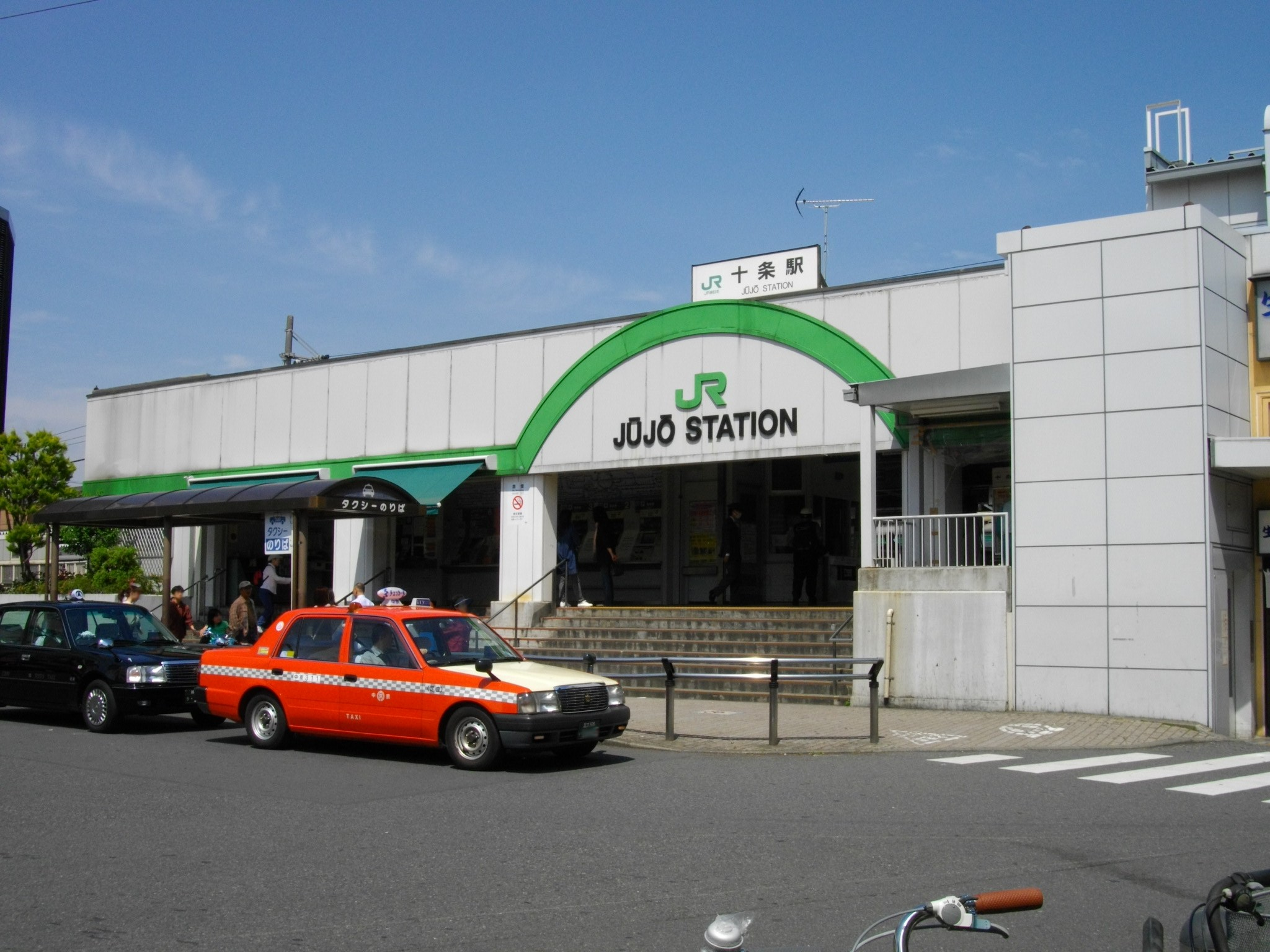
- Station entrance, May 2010

General information
- Location: 1 Kamijūjō, Kita, Tokyo （東京都北区上十条1丁目） Japan
- Operator: JR East
- Line: Saikyō Line
- Connections: Bus stop

History
- Opened: 1 November 1910

Passengers
- FY2011: 34,044 daily

Services
Preceding station	JR East	Following station
Itabashi JA13 towards Ōsaki	Saikyō Line Commuter Rapid Rapid Local	Akabane towards Ōmiya
Location

Jūjō Station (十条駅, Jūjō-eki) is a railway station on the Saikyō Line in Kita, Tokyo, Japan, operated by East Japan Railway Company (JR East).

== Lines ==
Jūjō Station is served by the Akabane Line between Ikebukuro and Akabane stations, which forms part of the Saikyō Line which runs between Ōsaki in Tokyo and Ōmiya in Saitama Prefecture. Some trains continue northward to Kawagoe via the Kawagoe Line and southward to Shin-Kiba via the TWR Rinkai Line. The station is located 3.5 km north of Ikebukuro Station.

== Station layout ==
The station consists of two side platforms serving two tracks.

=== Platforms ===
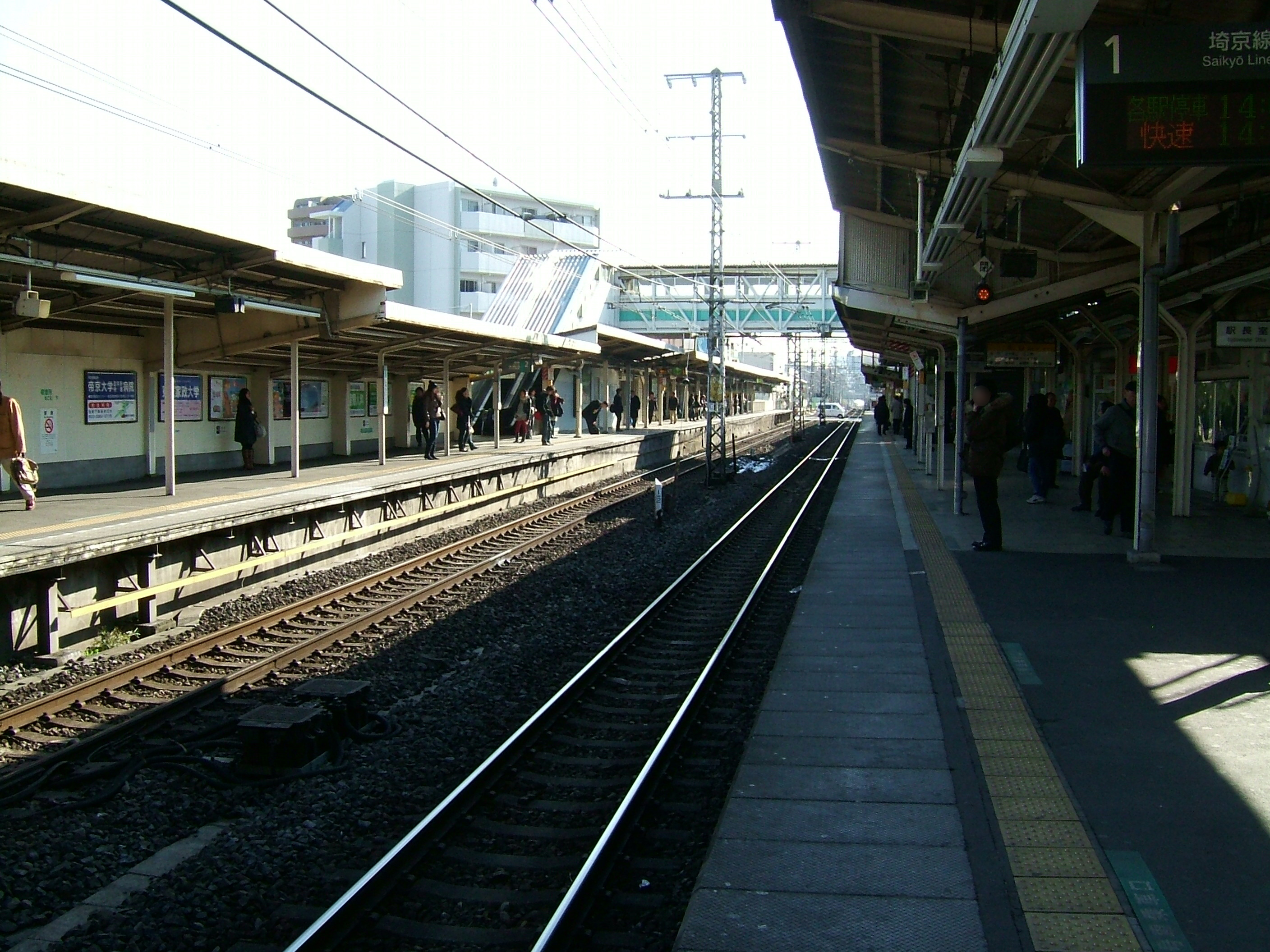
View of the platforms looking south, February 2008

1	Saikyō Line	for Akabane, Musashi-Urawa, Ōmiya ■ Kawagoe Line through service to Kawagoe
2	Saikyō Line	for Ikebukuro, Shinjuku, and Ōsaki; Rinkai Line through service to Shin-Kiba; Sotetsu Line through service to Hazawa Yokohama-Kokudai and Ebina

== History ==
Jūjō Station opened on 1 November 1910, serving the Akabane line.

== Passenger statistics ==
In fiscal 2011, the station was used by an average of 34,044 passengers daily (boarding passengers only).

The passenger figures for previous years are as shown below.

Fiscal year	Daily average
2000	30,764
2005	30,517
2010	34,134
2011	34,044

== Surrounding area ==
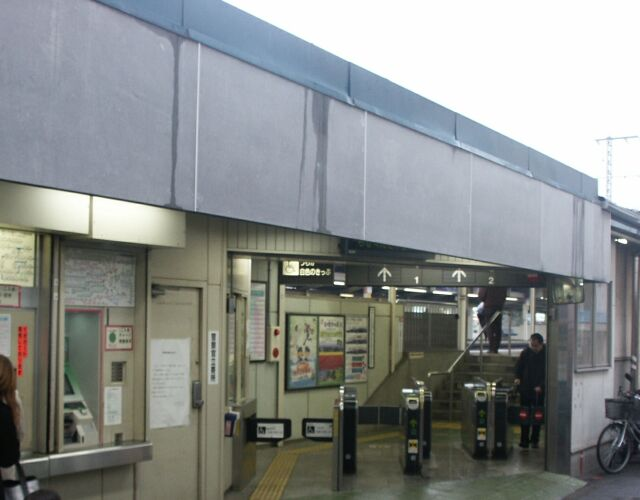
South entrance, March 2004

- Higashi-Jūjō Station (on the Keihin-Tohoku Line)
- Kitaku Central Park
- Teikyo University Itabashi campus
- Tokyo Kasei University
- Tokyo Seitoku University
- Tokyo Seitoku College
- JGSDF Camp Jujo
