= Ino Paper Museum =

Museum in Kochi Prefecture, Japan

Coordinates: 33°32′52″N 133°25′23.1″E

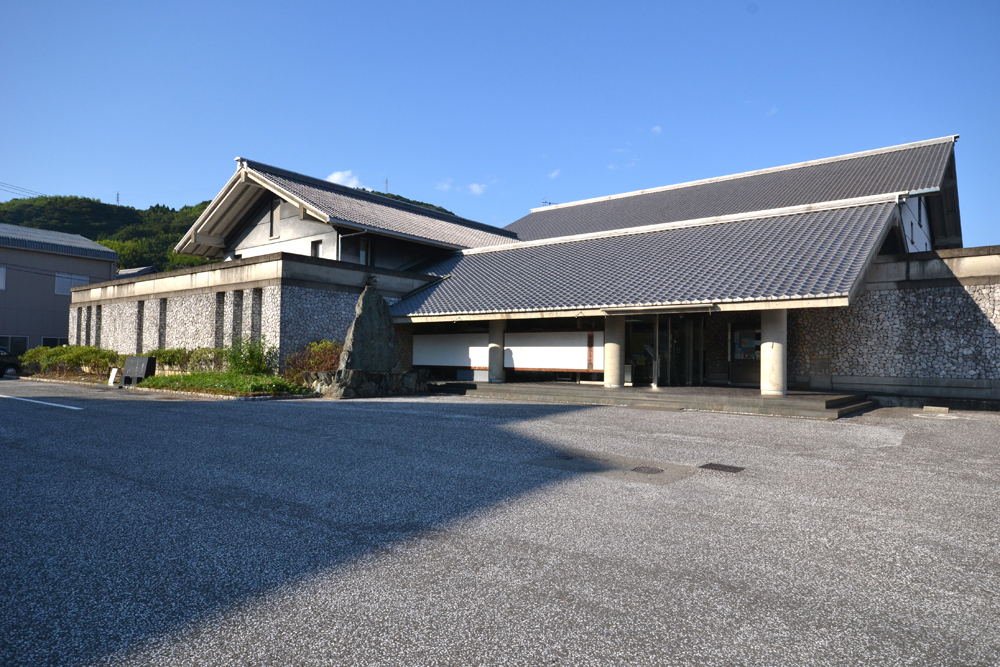
Ino Paper Museum

Ino Paper Museum (いの町紙の博物館, Ino-chō kami no hakubutsukan) is a museum of Japanese paper in Ino, Kōchi Prefecture, Japan. It focuses on the production of Tosa Washi, dating back over a thousand years, and paper is also made by hand in a workshop on site.

== See also ==
- Paper Museum in Kita, Tokyo
- Washi
- List of washi
