= Higashi-Jūjō Station =

Railway station in Tokyo, Japan

Coordinates: 35°45′47″N 139°43′40″E

JK37 Higashi-Jūjō Station 東十条駅
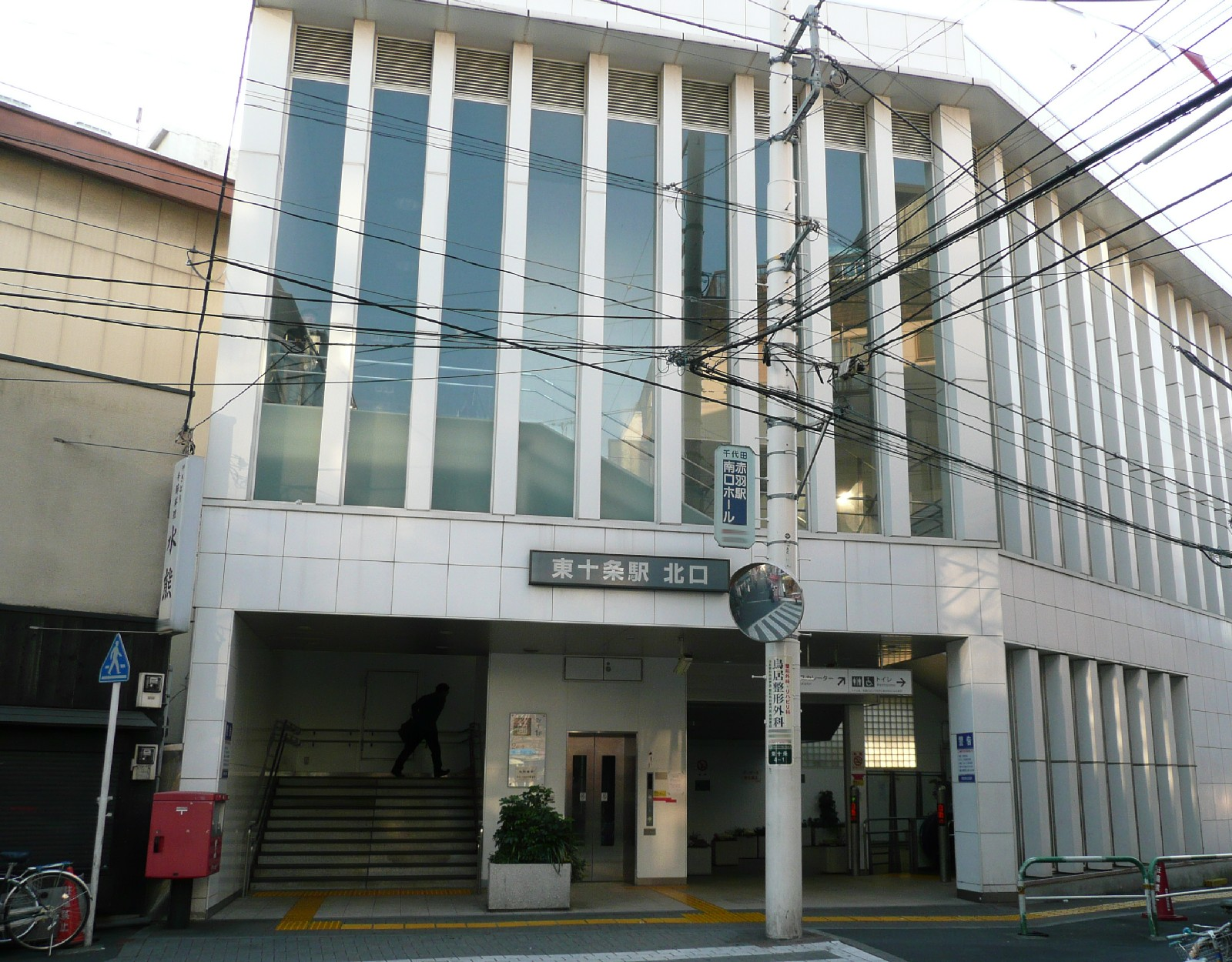
- North entrance of the station, January 2010

General information
- Location: 3 Higashi-Jūjō, Kita-ku, Kita, Tokyo （東京都北区東十条3丁目） Japan
- Operator: JR East
- Line: Keihin-Tōhoku Line
- Platforms: 2 island platforms

History
- Opened: 1931
- Former names: Shimo-Jūjō (until 1957)

Passengers
- 21,762 daily

Services
Preceding station	JR East	Following station
Ōji JK36 towards Yokohama	Keihin–Tōhoku Line Rapid Local	Akabane JK38 towards Ōmiya
Location

Higashi-Jūjō Station (東十条駅, Higashi-Jūjō-eki) is a railway station in Kita, Tokyo, Japan, operated by East Japan Railway Company (JR East).

== Lines ==
Higashi-Jūjō Station is served by the Keihin-Tōhoku Line from Ōmiya to Ōfuna. It is located 18.9 km from Ōmiya and 11.4 km from Tokyo.

== Station layout ==
The station has two ground-level island platforms serving three tracks (platforms 2 and 3 are located on either side of the same track).

=== Platforms ===
1/2	Keihin-Tōhoku Line	for Ueno, Tokyo, Yokohama, and Ōfuna
3	Keihin-Tōhoku Line	Terminating services only
4	Keihin-Tōhoku Line	for Akabane, Urawa, and Ōmiya

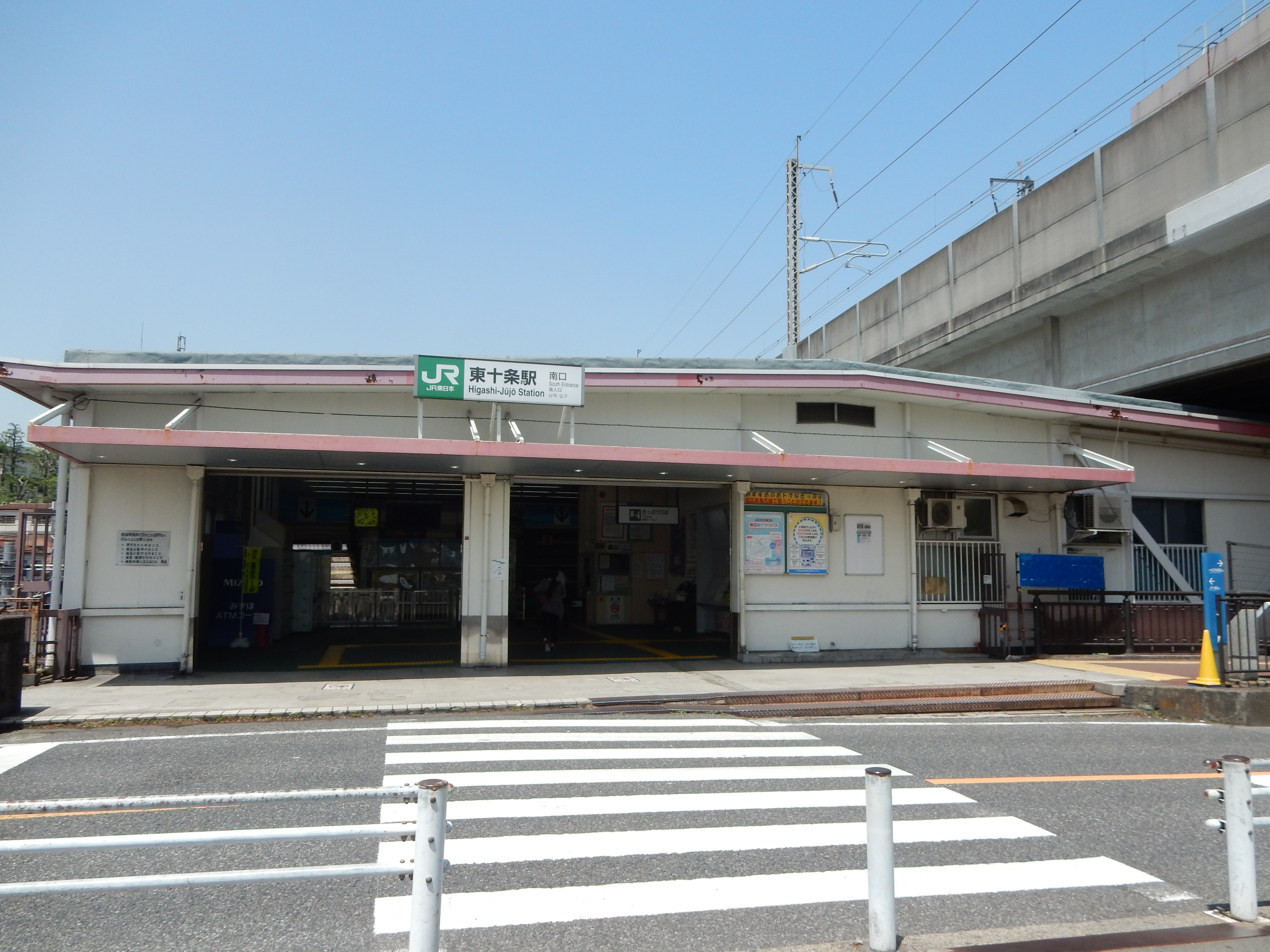
South entrance of the station, May 2017

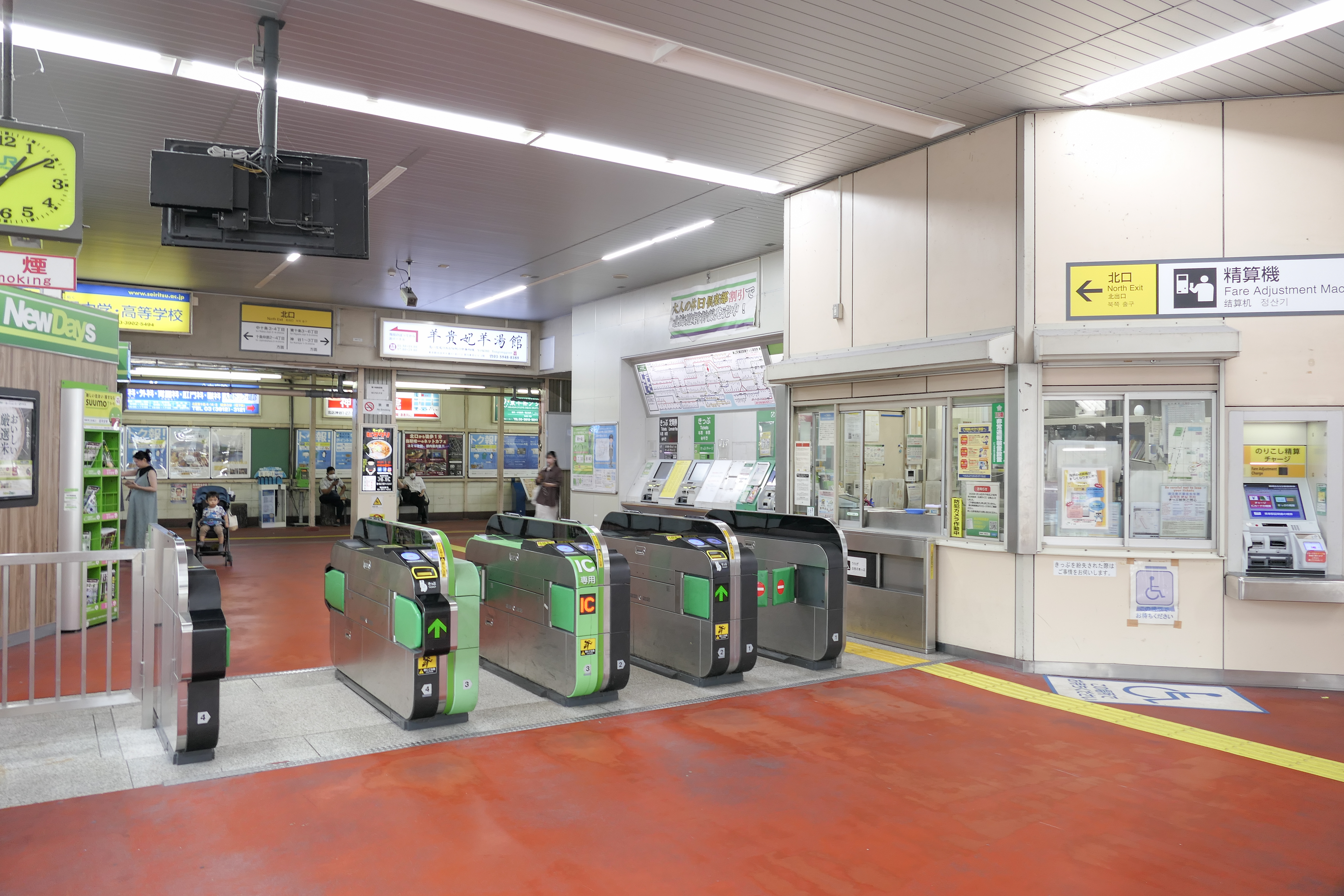
North ticket gate, May 2023

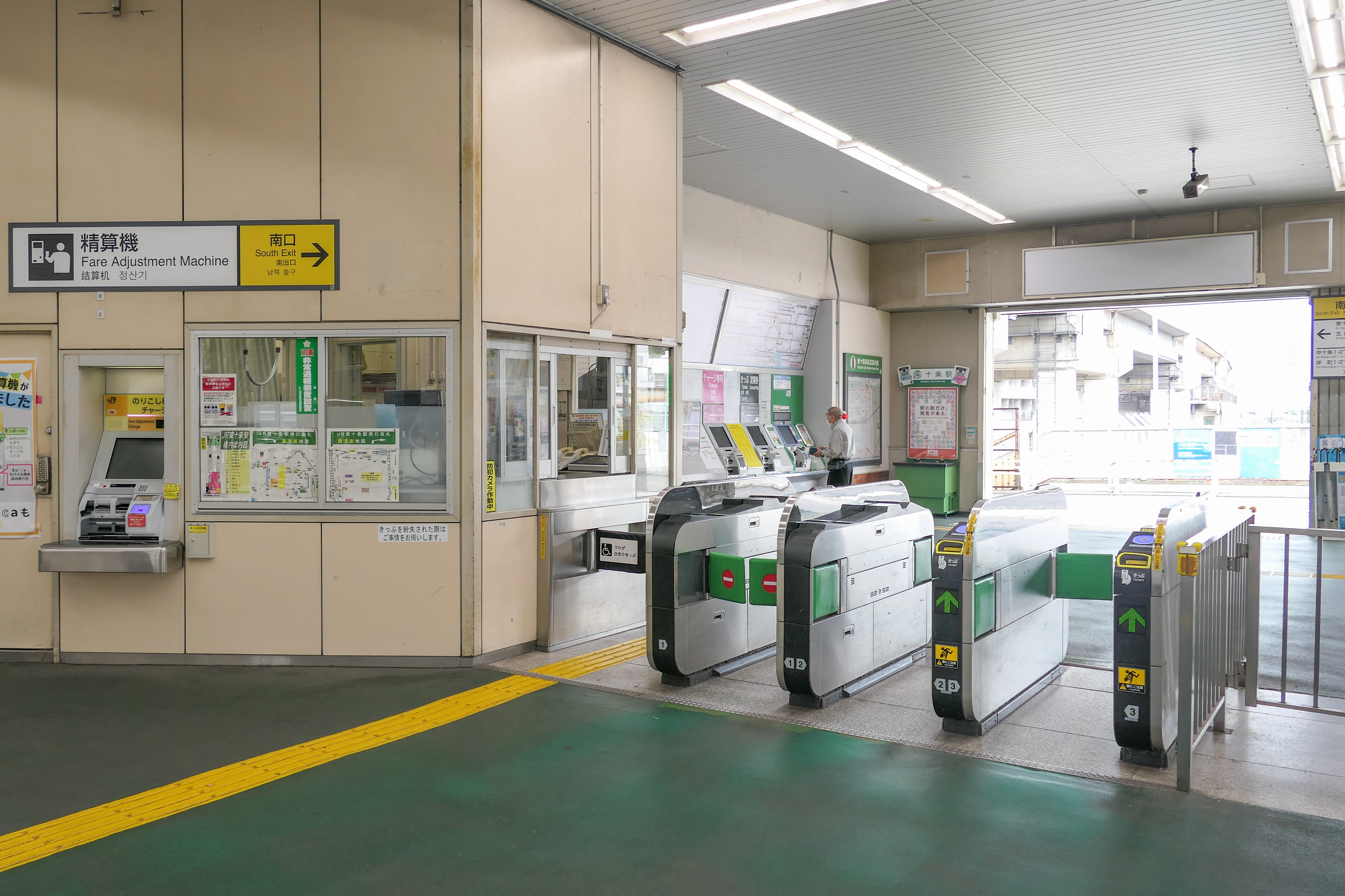
South ticket gate, May 2023

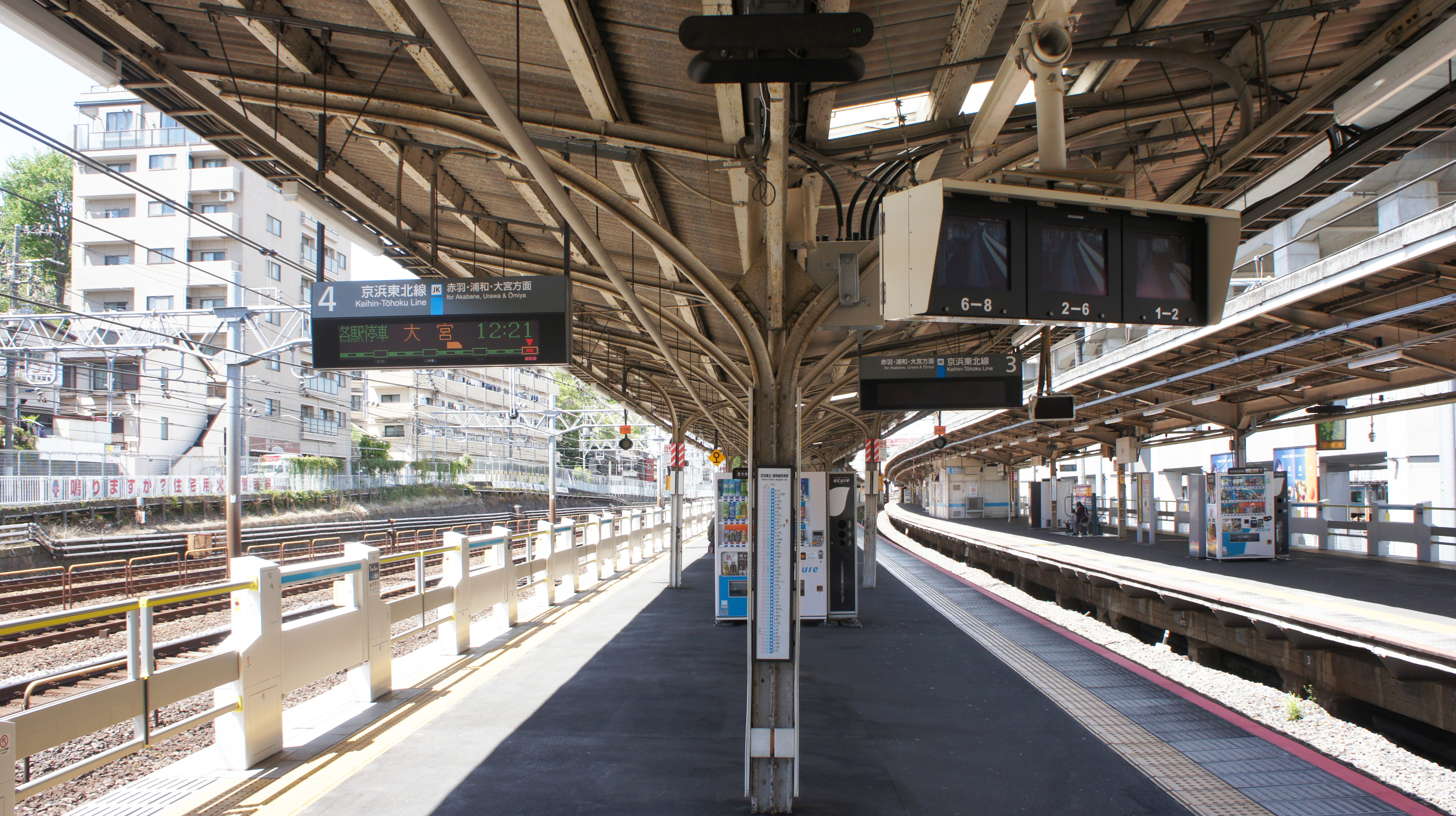
View of the platforms, April 2021

== History ==
The stations opened on 1 August 1931, initially named Shimo-Jūjō Station. On 1 April 1957, the station was renamed Higashi-Jūjō.

== Surrounding area ==
- Jūjō Station (Saikyō Line)
- Fuji Shrine
- Saionji Temple
