= Seiyu Group =

Japanese retail group

- Type: Public (Kabushiki gaisha)
- Industry: Retail
- Founded: 1946; 80 years ago
- Headquarters: Kichijoji Honmachi, Musashino City, Tokyo
- Number of locations: 328 (January 31, 2021)
- Key people: Tsuneo Okubo (CEO)
- Products: Grocery, general merchandise
- Owner: Trial Holdings (100%)
- Parent: Seibu Group (1956–1980); Walmart (2008–2020); KKR (2021–2025)
- Website: Commercial website

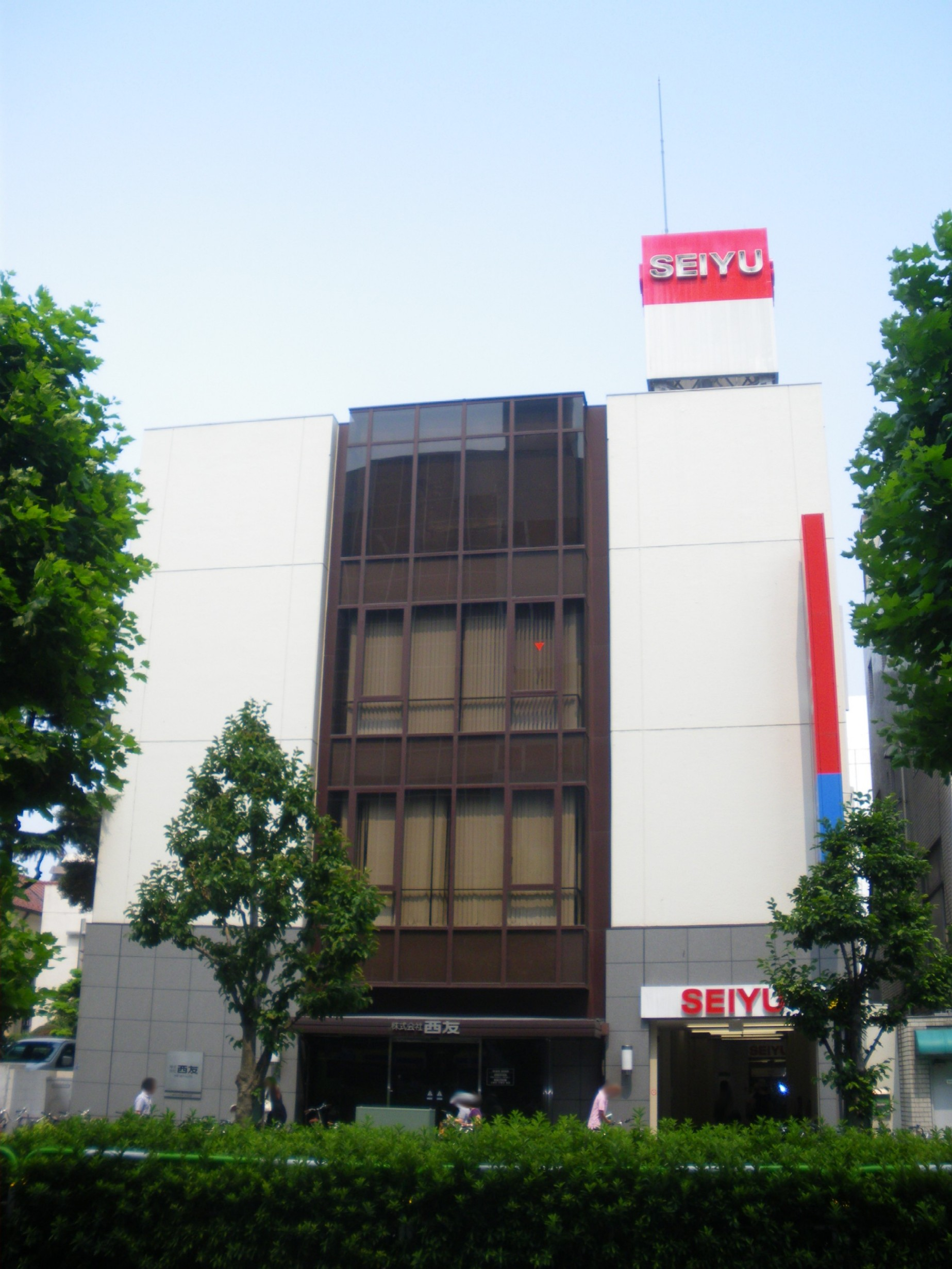
Main shop in Akabane (赤羽), Kita, Tokyo

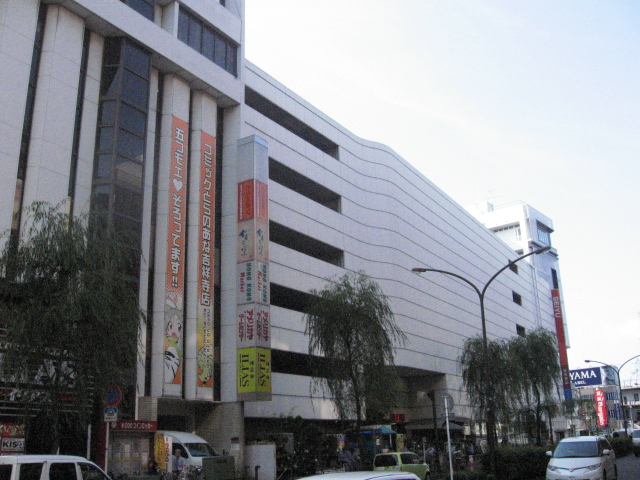
Seiyu Headquarters and Supermarket in Kichijoji, Tokyo

Seiyu KK (株式会社西友, Kabushiki-gaisha Seiyū; lit. 'Friend of Seibu Department Stores' or 'Friend of West'), or Seiyu Group (西友グループ, Seiyū Gurūpu), is a Japanese group of supermarkets, shopping centers and department stores, headquartered in Akabane (赤羽), Kita, Tokyo. On May 8, 2023, the Akabane headquarters office was relocated due to the redevelopment of Seiyu's Akabane store site. The current head office location is Kichijoji Honmachi, Musashino City, Tokyo.

Its company name means "innovation, leadership and excellence".

== History ==
The group was established in December 1946, and was formed in 1956 by Seibu Department Stores, a group company of Seibu Railway. In 1980, Seiyu launched its private brand Mujirushi-Ryōhin (commonly known as MUJI outside Japan). MUJI was transferred to the Ryohin Keikaku Company in 1990, and is no longer part of Seiyu. Also in 1980, Seiyu launched the "All-Value-No-Frills" brand, an innovation in product-line development. Over 1,450 high quality items in the brand are sold at a moderate price.

In 1991, Seiyu formed a consortium with six Asian retailers and one Hawaiian company to exchange expertise and set up joint ventures across Asia.

In 1996, Seiyu expanded to Thailand with local realtor Bang Chang, with its first outlet opened on September 26. It targets to have 20 stores by 2000.

On December 31, 2003, Seiyu and the US retail chain Walmart signed a partnership agreement in which Walmart would teach global supply chain practices. Numazu, Shizuoka was the site of the first Seiyu store using Walmart methods.

Walmart bought a 37 percent stake in Seiyu in 2003, and according to a company press release, in late 2005, Walmart acquired a majority stake in the company, buying out the remainder in 2008.

Previously, the company had a registered office in Higashi-Ikebukuro, Toshima, Tokyo.

In 2019, Walmart named Lionel Desclée, formerly of Delhaize and the Belgian pet shop chain Tom & Co, president and CEO of both Seiyu and Walmart Japan. In remarks after his appointment, he said Walmart had no interest in selling Seiyu. However, that June, Walmart outlined plans to relist Seiyu on the stock market.

Over the 2019-2020 period, Seiyu comparative-store sales grew 180 basis points faster than the market and EBITDA increased by nearly 40%. In addition, Rakuten Seiyu Netsuper, jointly operated by Seiyu and Rakuten, recorded a nearly 40% year-on-year increase in gross merchandise sales in the fourth quarter of 2020.

In 2020, Walmart announced they would be selling 65% of their shares in the company to private-equity firm KKR in a deal valuing 329 stores and 34,600 employees at $1.6 billion. Walmart is supposed to retain 15% and a seat on the board, while Japanese e-commerce giant Rakuten Inc. will receive 20%.

In 2023, Rakuten announced that it would sell its 20% stake in Seiyu to KKR.

In 2025, Trial Holdings agreed to acquire Seiyu from KKR, Walmart and the remaining shareholders, making Seiyu a wholly owned subsidiary. The transaction valued Seiyu at approximately ¥382.6 billion and was completed on July 1, 2025.

== Past regional expansion plans ==
In addition to its Japanese operations, Seiyu also had department stores operating under its name in Singapore and Hong Kong. The group used to directly operate these stores, but in October 2005, its three Singapore stores were sold to CapitaLand Limited, which transferred them to Beijing Hualian Group later the same year. The group's Hong Kong store in New Town Plaza, Sha Tin was sold to Sun Hung Kai Properties Limited in June 2005, but like the stores in Singapore. Until April 2008, the Hong Kong store was renamed to "Yata", and it had been expanded to twelve stores until December 2019. On the other hand, the Singapore stores were then renamed BHG, which stands for "Beijing Hualian Group".

== Group companies ==
Seiyu Group refers to an association of companies, of which The Seiyu, Ltd. is the parent. The companies in Seiyu Group are:

- The Seiyu, Ltd.
- Hokkaido Seiyu Co., Ltd.
- Tohoku Seiyu Co., Ltd.
- S.S.V. Inc.
- Kyushu Seiyu Co., Ltd.
- Sunny Co., Ltd.
- Wakana Co., Ltd.
- Smile Corp.
- The SCC, Ltd.
- Nicoh Inc.
- Nijicom Ltd.
- Smis Co., Ltd.
- Seiyu Service Co., Ltd.

== Further information ==
- Why Walmart Is Failing In Japan. CNBC. October 23, 2018. Archived from the original on December 22, 2021. - About Walmart's ownership of Seiyu Group
