= Kitaku Central Park =

Park in Kita, Tokyo, Japan

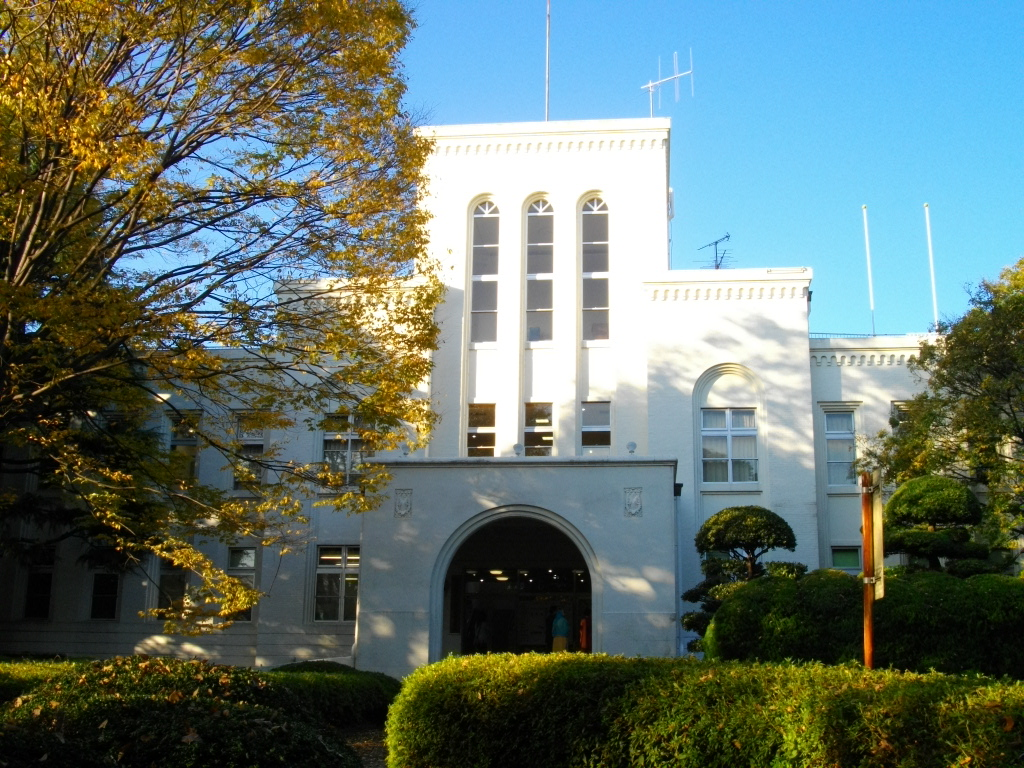
- Kita-ku Chuokoen Bunka Center
- Interactive map of Kitaku Central Park
- Location: Kita, Tokyo, Japan
- Coordinates: 35.7531955°N 139.7270348°E
- Area: 65,620 square metres (16.22 acres)
- Created: 1976
- Public transit: Ōji Station; Jujo Station

Kitaku Central Park (東京都北区立中央公園, Tōkyō-to Kita Kuritsu Chūō Kōen) is a public park in Kita, Tokyo, Japan.

== Facilities ==
- Baseball fields (2, night games allowed)
- Tennis courts (2 hard courts, night games possible)
- Open space
- Play equipment
- Cycling course (for children)
- Sowa Pond
- Central Park Cultural Center
- Central Library

== Access ==
- By train: 15 minutes’ walk from Ōji Station.

== See also ==
- Parks and gardens in Tokyo
- National Parks of Japan
