= Tokyo Seitoku College =

Private junior college in Kita, Tokyo, Japan

Coordinates: 35°45′19.48″N 139°43′24.62″E

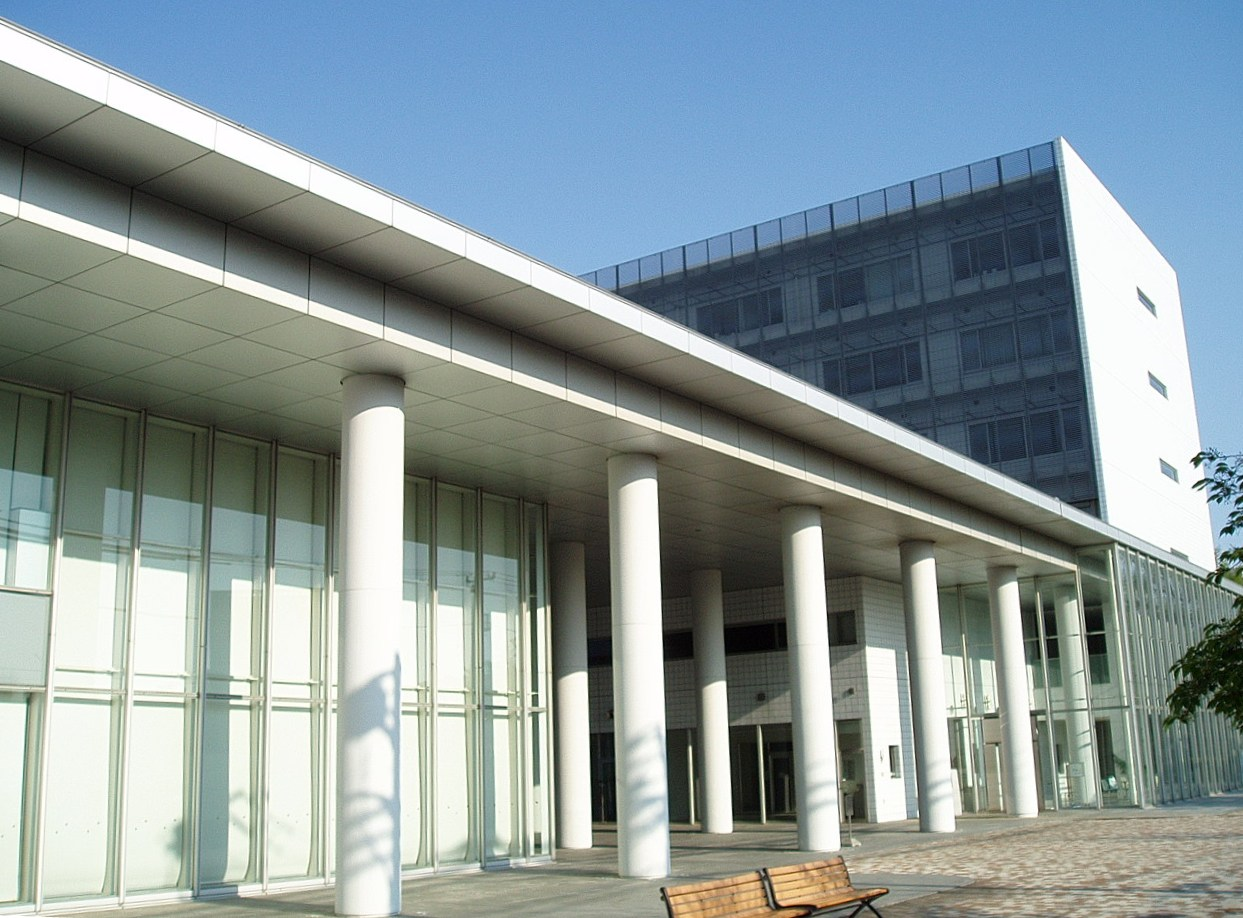

Tokyo Seitoku College (東京成徳短期大学, Tōkyō seitoku tanki daigaku) is a private junior college in Kita, Tokyo, Japan. The precursor of the school was founded in 1925, and it was chartered as a university in 1965.
