= Akabane Station =

Railway station in Tokyo, Japan

ABNJK38 JU04 JA15 JS22 Akabane Station 赤羽駅
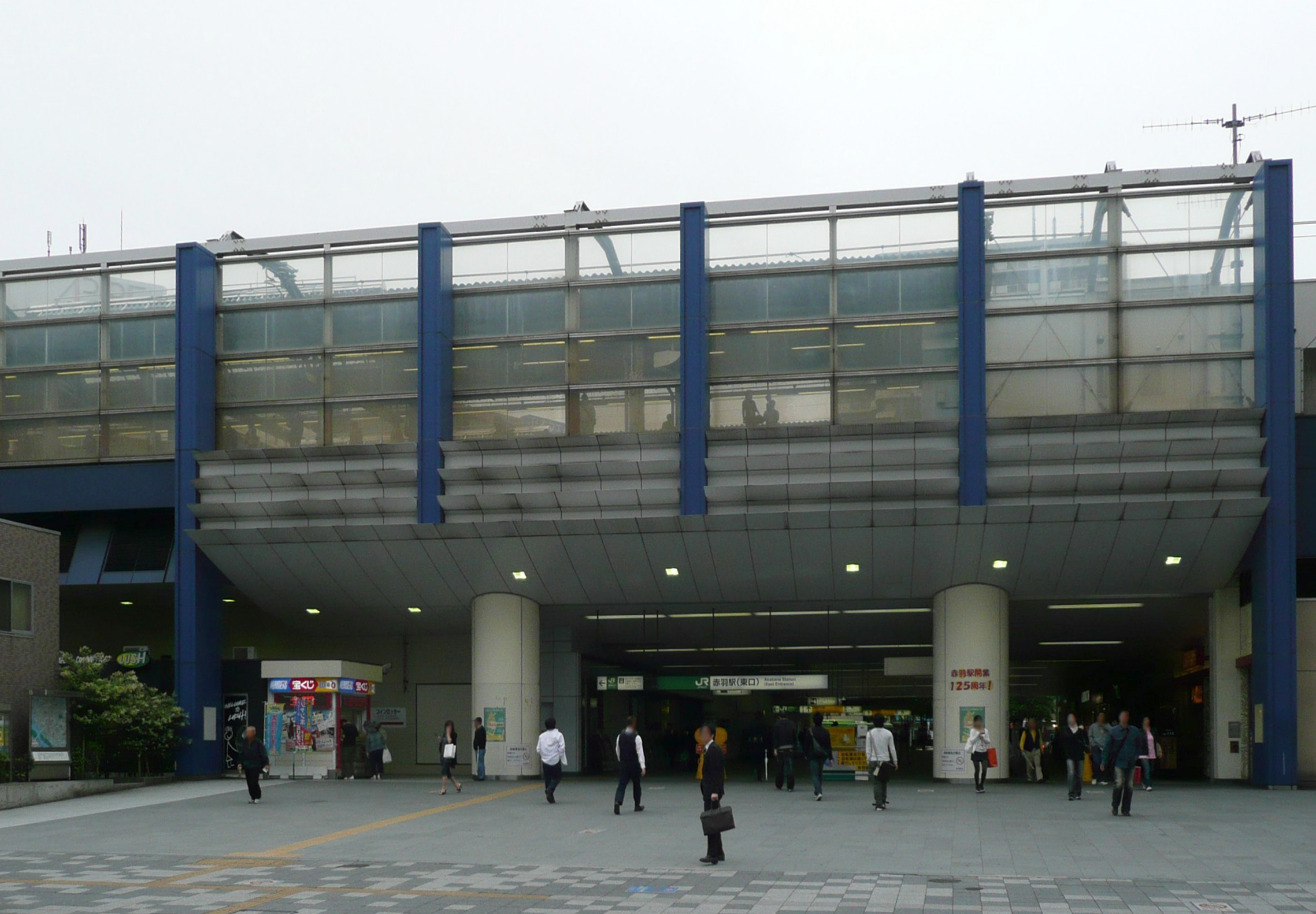
- Akabane Station east exit, May 2010

General information
- Location: 1 Akabane, Kita, Tokyo （東京都北区赤羽1丁目） Japan
- Coordinates: 35°46′41″N 139°43′15″E
- Operator: JR East
- Line: Tōhoku Main Line
- Connections: Bus terminal

History
- Opened: 1 March 1885

Passengers
- FY2013: 89,742 daily
Services
| Preceding station | JR East | Following station |
|---|---|---|
| Higashi-Jūjō JK37 towards Yokohama | Keihin–Tōhoku Line Rapid Local | Kawaguchi JK39 towards Ōmiya |
| Ueno Terminus | Kusatsu | Urawa towards Naganohara-Kusatsuguchi |
| Ueno Terminus | Akagi | Urawa towards Takasaki |
| Ueno One-way operation | Utsunomiya / Takasaki lines Rapid Rabbit & Urban | Urawa towards Utsunomiya or Takasaki |
| Oku JU03 towards Tokyo | Utsunomiya / Takasaki lines Local | Urawa towards Kuroiso or Maebashi |
| Ikebukuro towards Odawara or Zushi | Shōnan–Shinjuku Line Special Rapid Rapid Local | Urawa towards Takasaki, Maebashi or Utsunomiya |
| Jūjō JA14 towards Ōsaki | Saikyō Line Commuter Rapid | Musashi-Urawa JA21 towards Ōmiya |
| Jūjō JA14 towards Ōsaki | Saikyō Line Rapid | Toda-Kōen JA18 towards Ōmiya |
| Jūjō JA14 towards Ōsaki | Saikyō Line Local | Kita-Akabane JA16 towards Ōmiya |
Location

Akabane Station (赤羽駅, Akabane-eki) is a railway station in Kita, Tokyo, Japan, operated by the East Japan Railway Company (JR East).

== Lines ==
Akabane Station is served by the following lines.

- Tōhoku Main Line (Utsunomiya Line)
- Takasaki Line
- Keihin-Tōhoku Line
- Shōnan-Shinjuku Line
- Saikyō Line

== Station layout ==
The station consists of four elevated island platforms serving eight tracks. The tracks of the Tōhoku Shinkansen also cross this station, above the Saikyō Line platforms.

The station has a "Midori no Madoguchi" staffed ticket office and a "View Plaza" travel agency.

=== Platforms ===
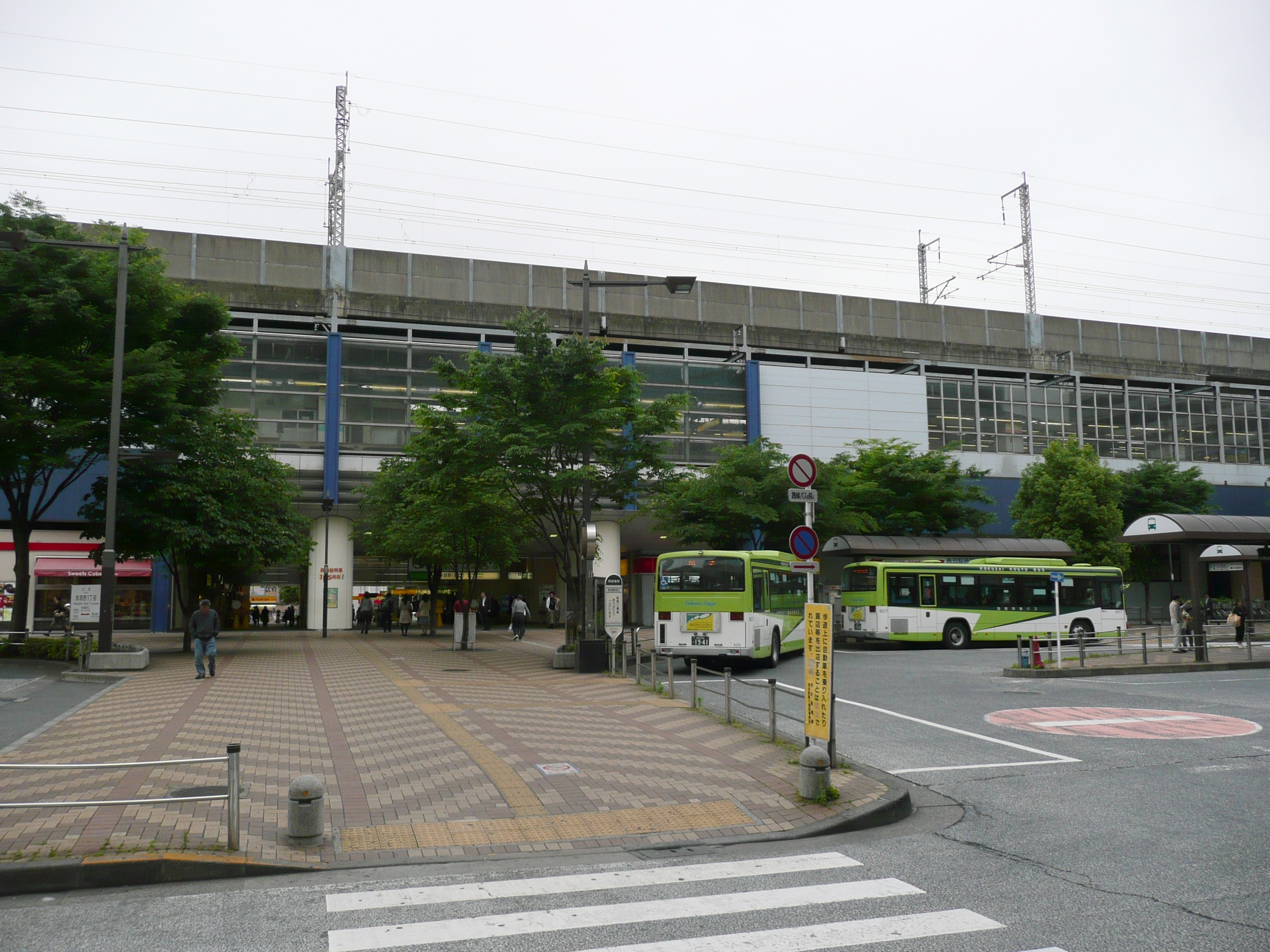
Akabane Station west exit, May 2010

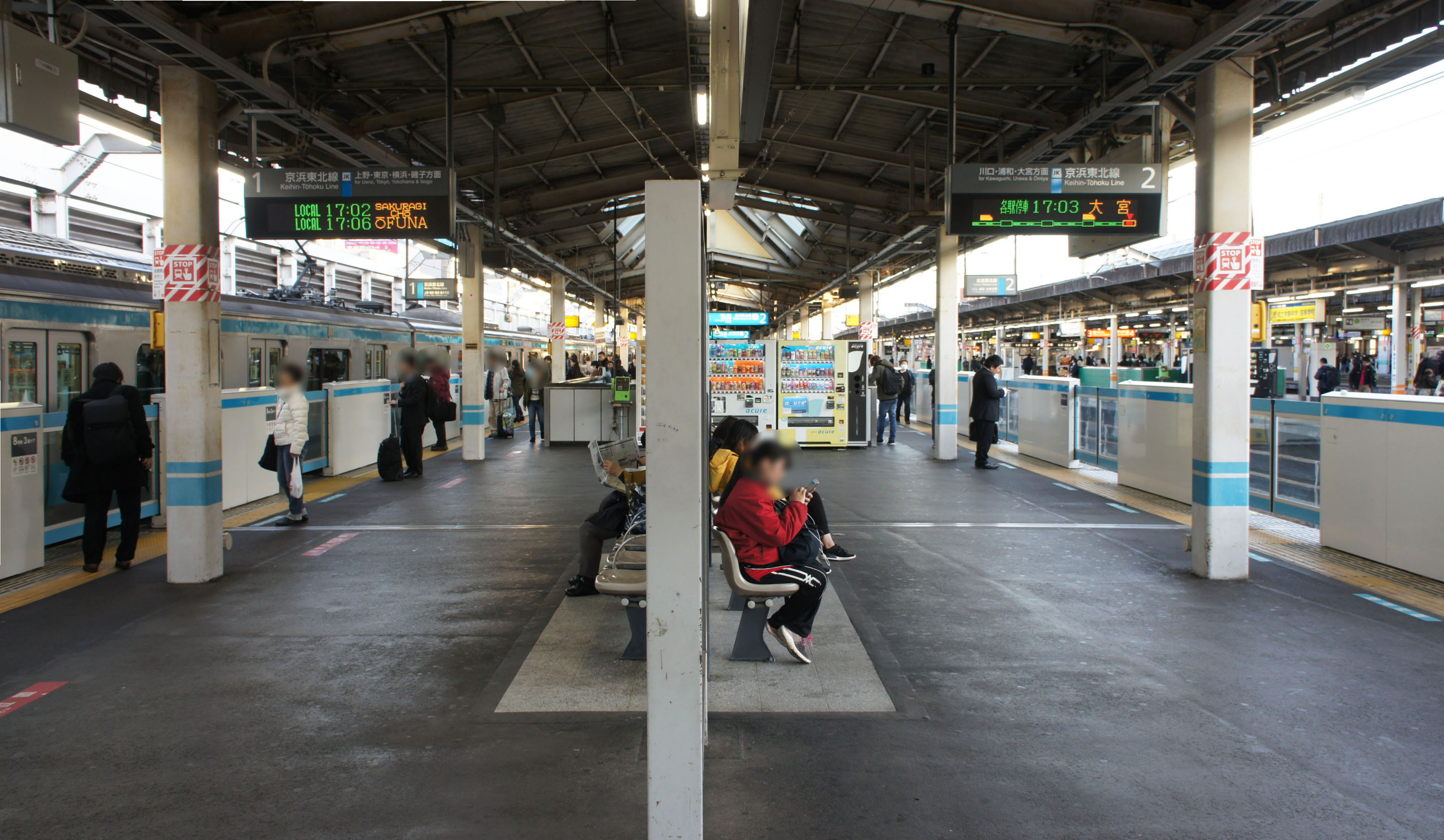
View from platform 1/2

| 1 | Keihin-Tōhoku Line | for Ueno, Tokyo, Yokohama and Ofuna |
| 2 | Keihin-Tōhoku Line | for Urawa and Ōmiya |
| 3 | Utsunomiya Line | for Ueno; Ueno-Tokyo Line for Tokyo, Yokohama, and Atami |
| 3 | Takasaki Line | for Ueno; Ueno-Tokyo Line for Tokyo, Yokohama, and Atami |
| 4 | Utsunomiya Line | for Ōmiya, Oyama, and Utsunomiya |
| 4 | Takasaki Line | for Ōmiya, Kumagaya, and Takasaki |
| 5 | Shōnan-Shinjuku Line | for Ikebukuro, Shinjuku, Yokohama and Ofuna; Yokosuka Line for Zushi; Tokaido Line for Odawara |
| 6 | Shōnan-Shinjuku Line | for Ōmiya; Takasaki Line for Takasaki; Utsunomiya Line for Utsunomiya |
| 7 | Saikyō Line | for Ikebukuro, Shinjuku, and Ōsaki; Rinkai Line for Shin-Kiba; Sotetsu Line for Hazawa yokohama-kokudai and Ebina |
| 8 | Saikyō Line | for Musashi-Urawa, Ōmiya ■ Kawagoe Line for Kawagoe |

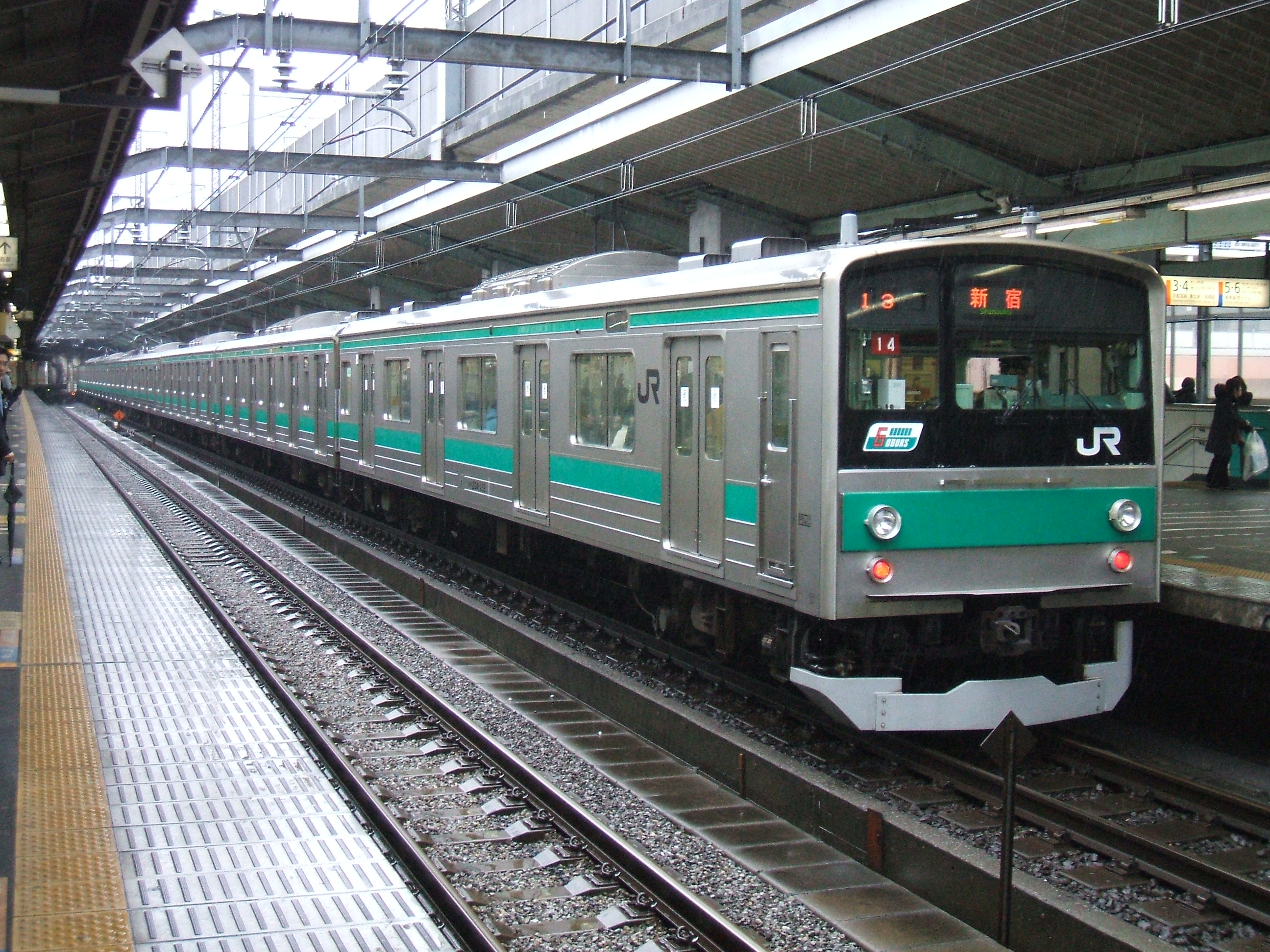
A Saikyo Line 205 series EMU at Akabane Station, March 2008

== History ==
Akabane Station opened on 1 March 1885.

== Passenger statistics ==
In fiscal 2013, the station was used by an average of 89,742 passengers daily (boarding passengers only), making it the 47th-busiest station operated by JR East. The passenger figures for previous years (boarding passengers only) are as shown below.

| Fiscal year | Daily average |
|---|---|
| 2000 | 82,041 |
| 2005 | 86,459 |
| 2010 | 86,869 |
| 2011 | 87,346 |
| 2012 | 88,140 |
| 2013 | 89,742 |

== Surrounding area ==
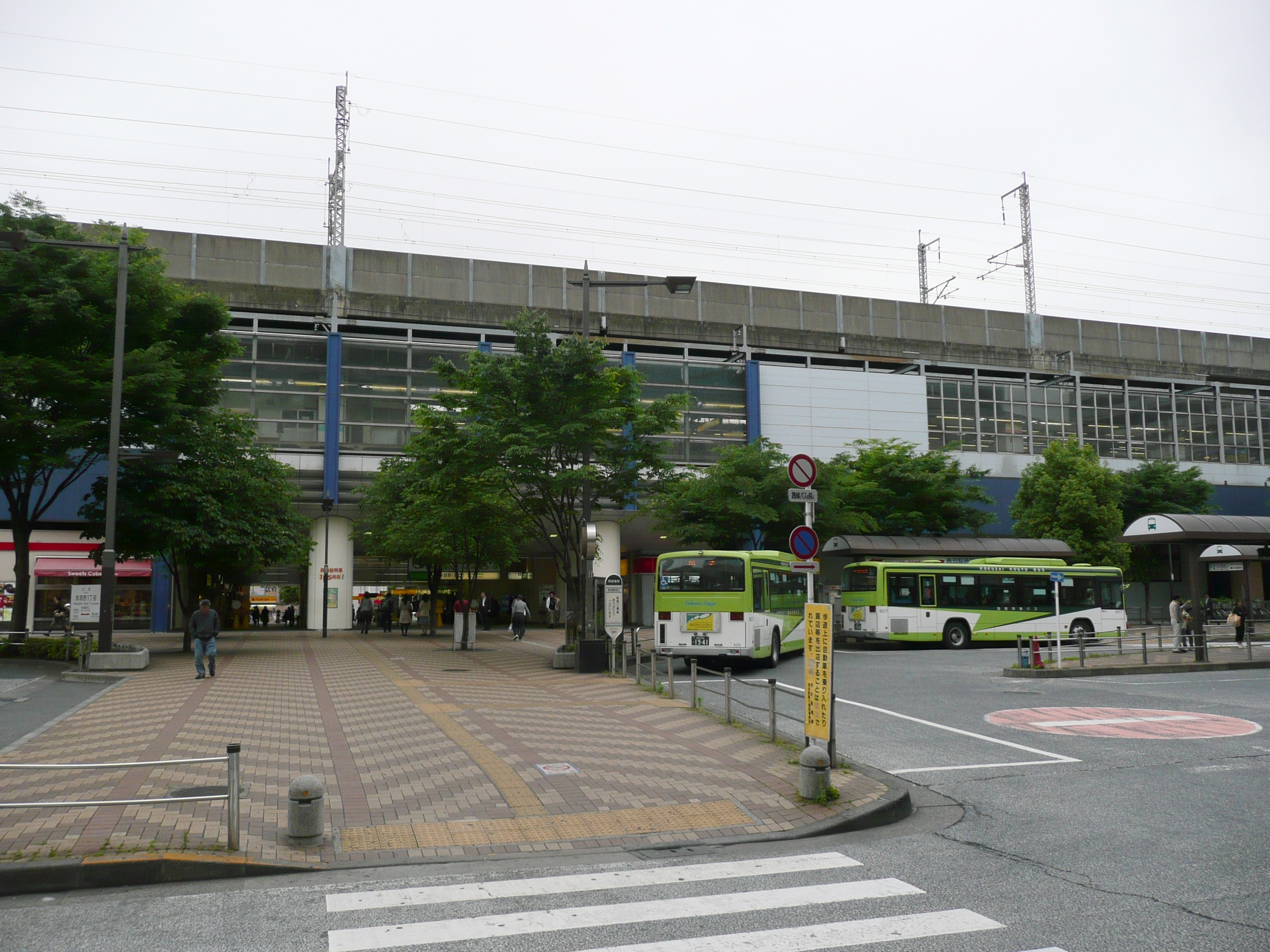
West side of the station, May 2010

- Akabane-iwabuchi Station (Tokyo Metro Namboku Line)
- Arakawa River
- Shingashi River
- Sumida River
- Toyo University Akabane campus
- Nishigaoka Soccer Stadium
