= List of washi =

This is a list of Japanese papers and names of washi. All these washi are still made today.

== A ==
- Awa Aizomegami (阿波藍染紙)
- Awajigami
- Awagami (阿波紙) or Awawashi (阿波和紙)

== B ==
- Bashōshi (芭蕉紙)
- Bitchū Torinokogami (備中鳥子紙)
- Birutangami (蛭谷紙)

== C ==
- Chigusagami
- Chirimen (縮緬) or Chirimengami(縮緬紙) cf.縮緬本
- Chochingami (提灯紙)

== D ==
- Danshi

== E ==
- Etchu washi (越中和紙)
- Etchu Katasomegami
- Echizen Bijutsu Kogeishi
- Echizen Hoshoshi (越前奉書紙)
- Echizen Torinokogami (越前鳥子紙)
- Edo Chiyogami (江戸千代紙)
- Edo Karakami (江戸からかみ)

== G ==
- Gokayama washi

== H ==
- Haigushi
- Honminogami
- Hosokawagami (細川紙)

== I ==
- Inshu Gasenshi
- Ise-katagami
- IseWashi (伊勢和紙)
- Iyo Hoshoshi
- Izumo Mingeishi

== J ==
- Jumonjigami

== K ==
- Kadodegami
- Kaga Ganpishi
- Kaga Hoshoshi
- Kairyo Hanshi
- Kamikawasakigami
- Kamogami
- Karasuyamagami
- Kasagami
- Kashinishigami
- Kiryugami
- Koidegami
- Koyagami
- Kurotanigami (黒谷紙)
- Kyo Chiyogami (京千代紙)
- Kyo Karakami (京からかみ)

== M ==
- Maniaigami
- Marumorigami
- Mashi
- Mimitsugami
- Mino Bijutsu Kogeishi (美濃美術工芸紙)
- Mino washi (美濃和紙) or Minogami (美濃紙)
- Misugami
- Miyachigami
- Miyamagami
- Momigami

== N ==
- Najio Torinokogami
- Naogami
- Nishijima Gasenshi
- Nishi no Uchigami

== O ==
- Obara Bijutsu Kogeishi
- Ogunigami
- Ohmi Ganpisi

== S ==
- Sanchushi
- Sekishu Hanshi
- Senkashi
- Shinsatsushi
- Shiroishigami
- Shuzenjigami
- Sugiharagami or Suibaragami (杉原紙)
- Suruga Yunogami

== T ==
- Tosa Bijutsu Kogeishi
- Tosa Shodō Yōshi (土佐書道用紙)
- Tosa Tengujyoshi (土佐典具帖紙)
- Tosa washi (土佐和紙)
- Tozanshi
- Tsurutagami

== U ==
- Udagami
- Uchiyama Shojigami
- Usuminogami (薄美濃紙)

== W ==
- Wakasa Katasomegami

== Y ==
- Yamegami
- Yanagifugami
- Yasudagami
- Yoshinogami
