= Akabane, Tokyo =

Neighborhood in Kita, Tokyo, Japan

Akabane (赤羽, Akabane), is a neighborhood in Kita, Tokyo, located near the border with Saitama Prefecture. Its postal code is 115–0045. Akabane is popular as a residential neighborhood due to its direct train access to much of central Tokyo.

== Education ==
Akabane's elementary and junior high schools are operated by the City of Kita Board of Education.

Different portions of Akabane are zoned to different elementary schools depending on what address the resident has:

- Akabane Elementary School (赤羽小学校)
- No. 4 Iwabuchi Elementary School (第四岩淵小学校)

All of Akabane is zoned to Akabaneiwabuchi Junior High School (赤羽岩淵中学校).

== Transport ==
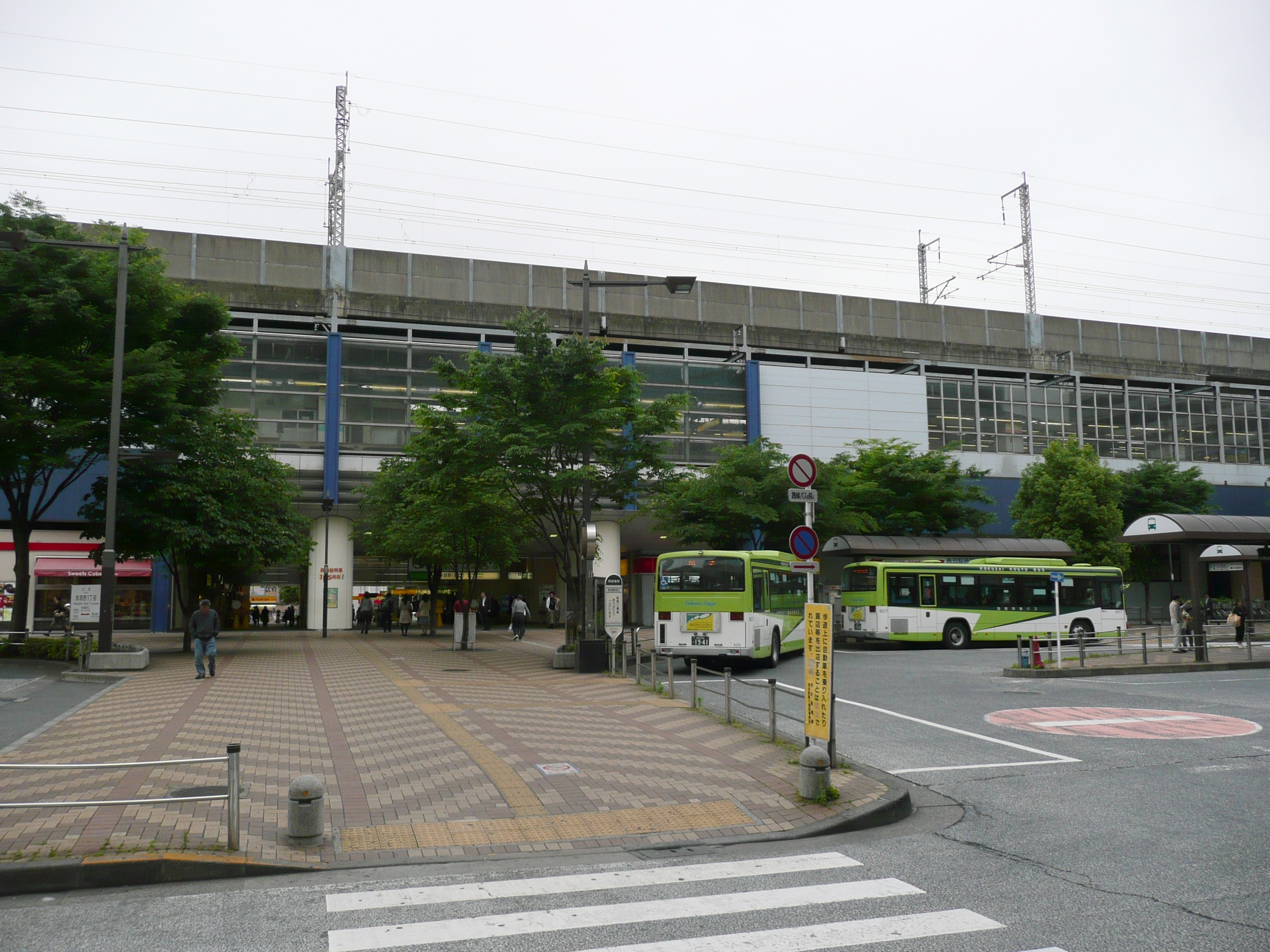
The west side of Akabane Station

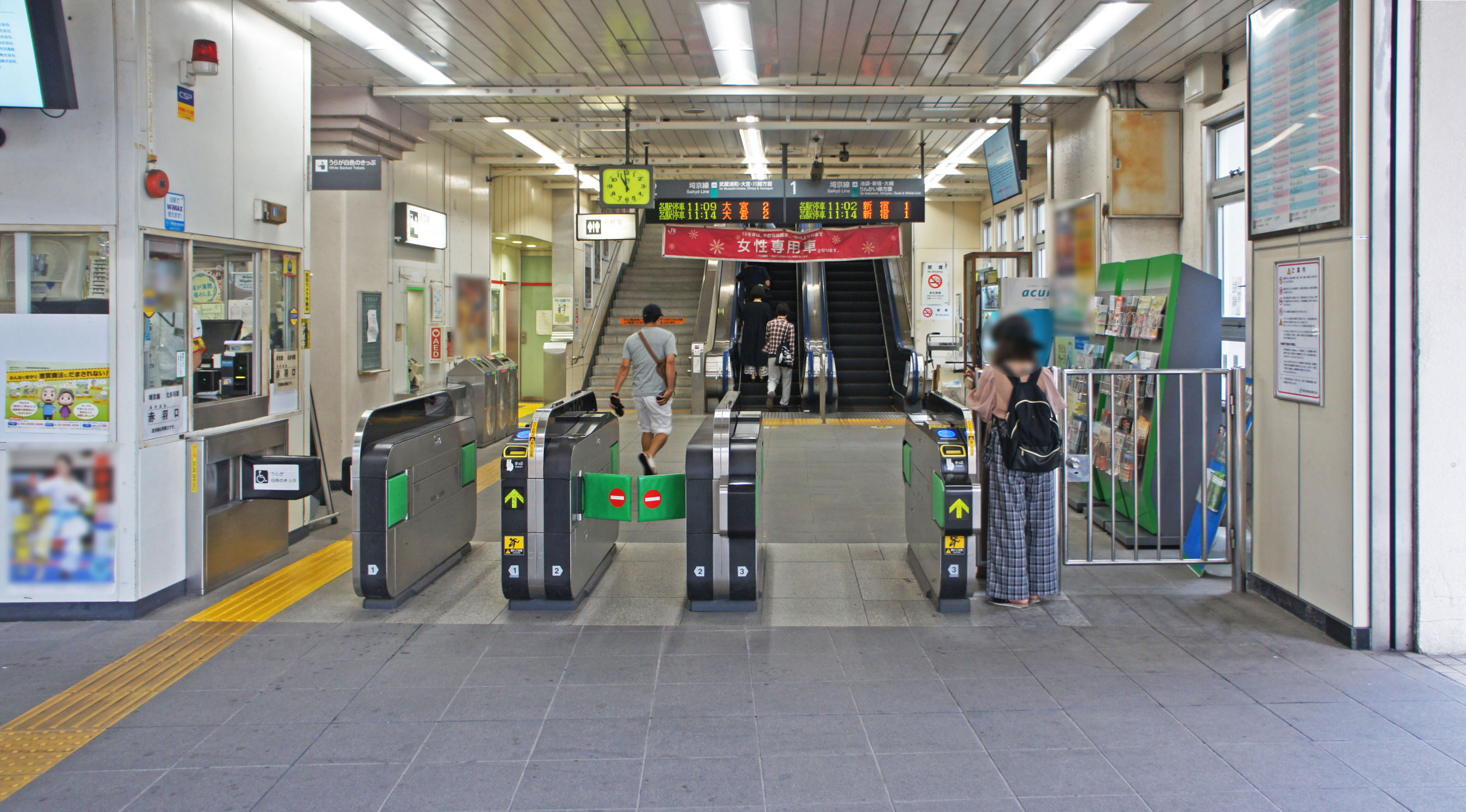
The Akabane Station gates

Akabane Station is located in the neighborhood and is a stop on four different train lines operated by the East Japan Railway Company.
