= Asukayama Park =

Public park in Kita, Tokyo, Japan

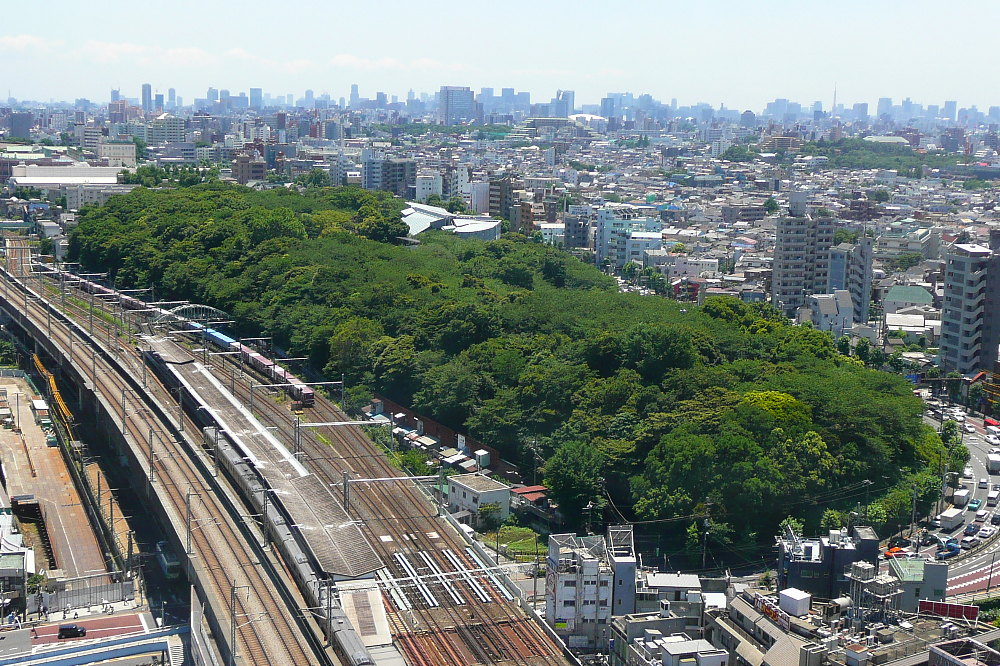
- Asukayama Park
- Interactive map of Asukayama Park
- Location: Kita, Tokyo, Japan
- Coordinates: 35°45′2″N 139°44′20″E
- Area: 73,000 square metres (18 acres)
- Created: 1873

Asukayama Park (飛鳥山公園, Asukayama Kōen) is a public park in Kita, Tokyo, Japan.

== History ==
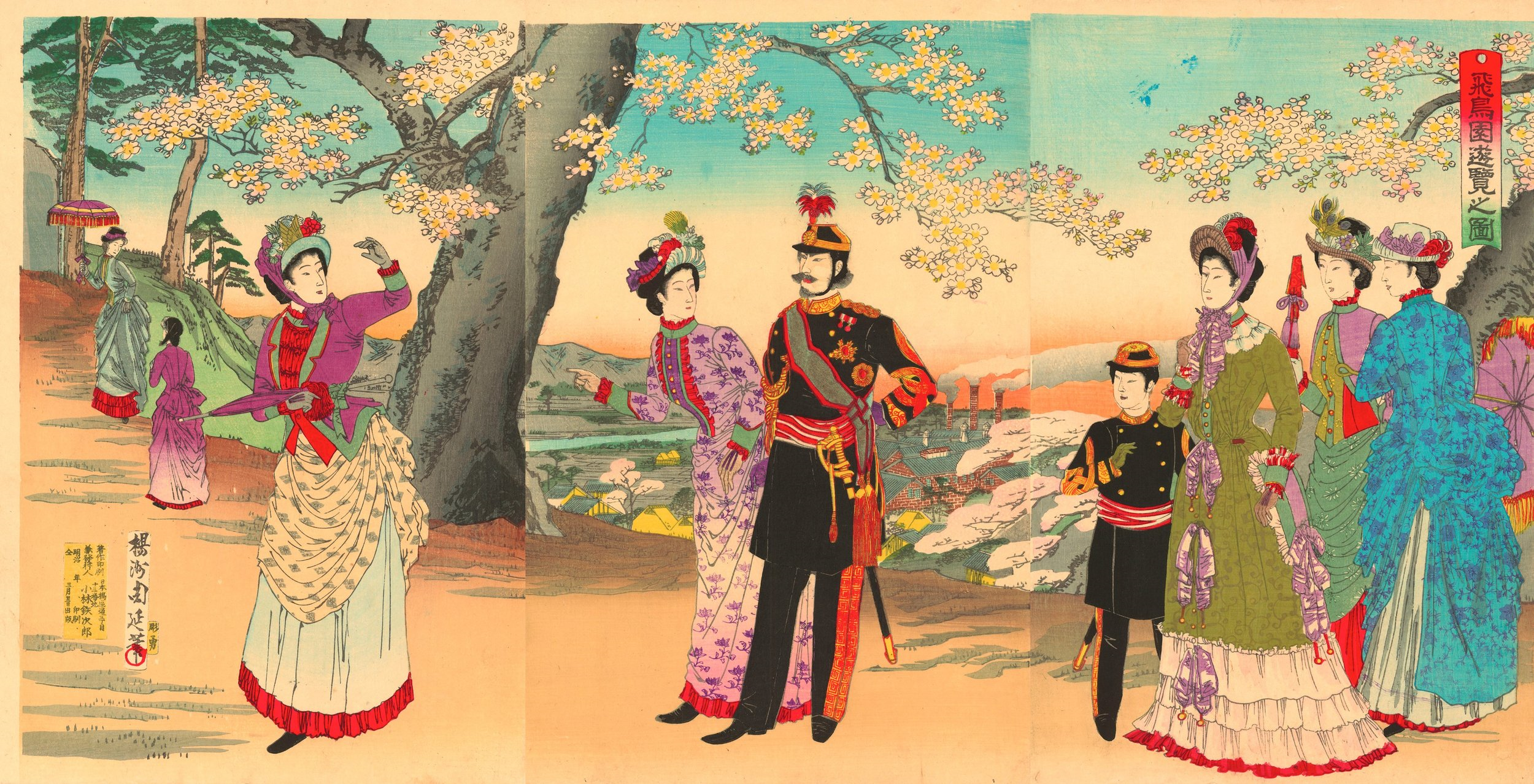
A woodblock print showing Emperor Meiji at Asukayama Park

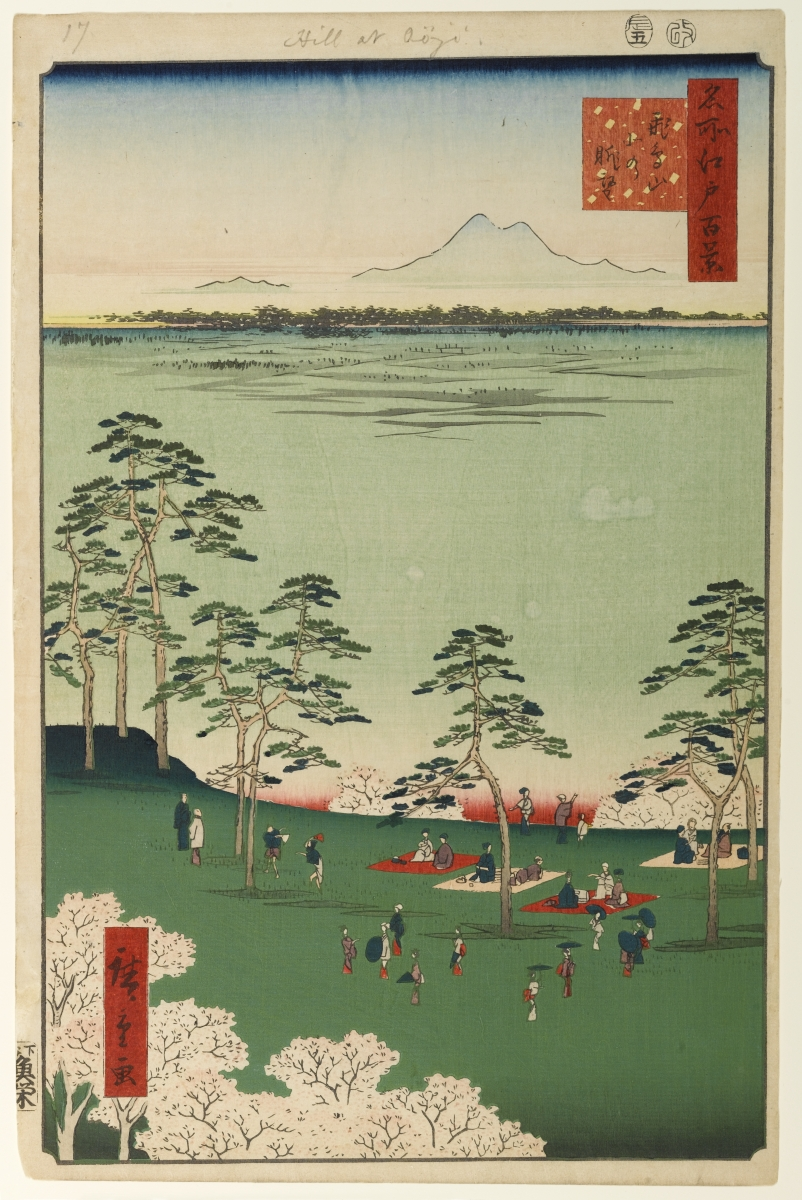
Hiroshige

In the early eighteenth century, shōgun Tokugawa Yoshimune planted many cherry trees in the area and opened up the land for the enjoyment of the "Edokko" or citizens of Tokyo. The park was formally established, alongside Ueno Park, Shiba Park, Asakusa Park, and Fukagawa Park, in 1873 by the Dajō-kan, as Japan's first public parks. In 1998, three museums were opened inside the park, designed by AXS Satow: the Kita City Asukayama Museum (北区飛鳥山博物館), the Shibusawa Memorial Museum (渋沢史料館), and the Paper Museum (紙の博物館).

== Preserved railway vehicles ==
The park is home to two preserved railway vehicles: former Toei 6000 series tram car number 6080 and JNR Class D51 steam locomotive number D51 853.

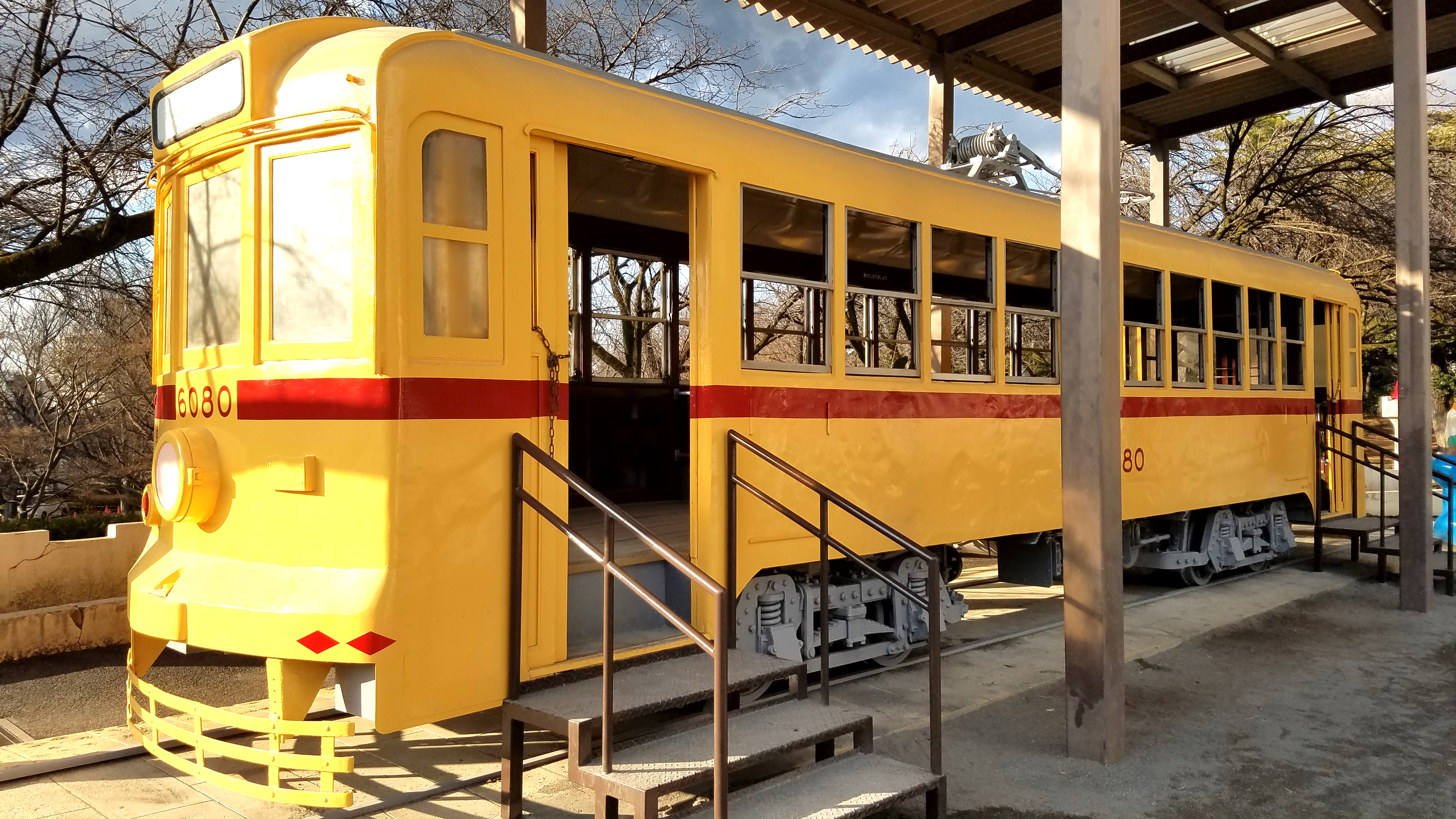
Former Toei 6000 series tramcar number 6080 in February 2021

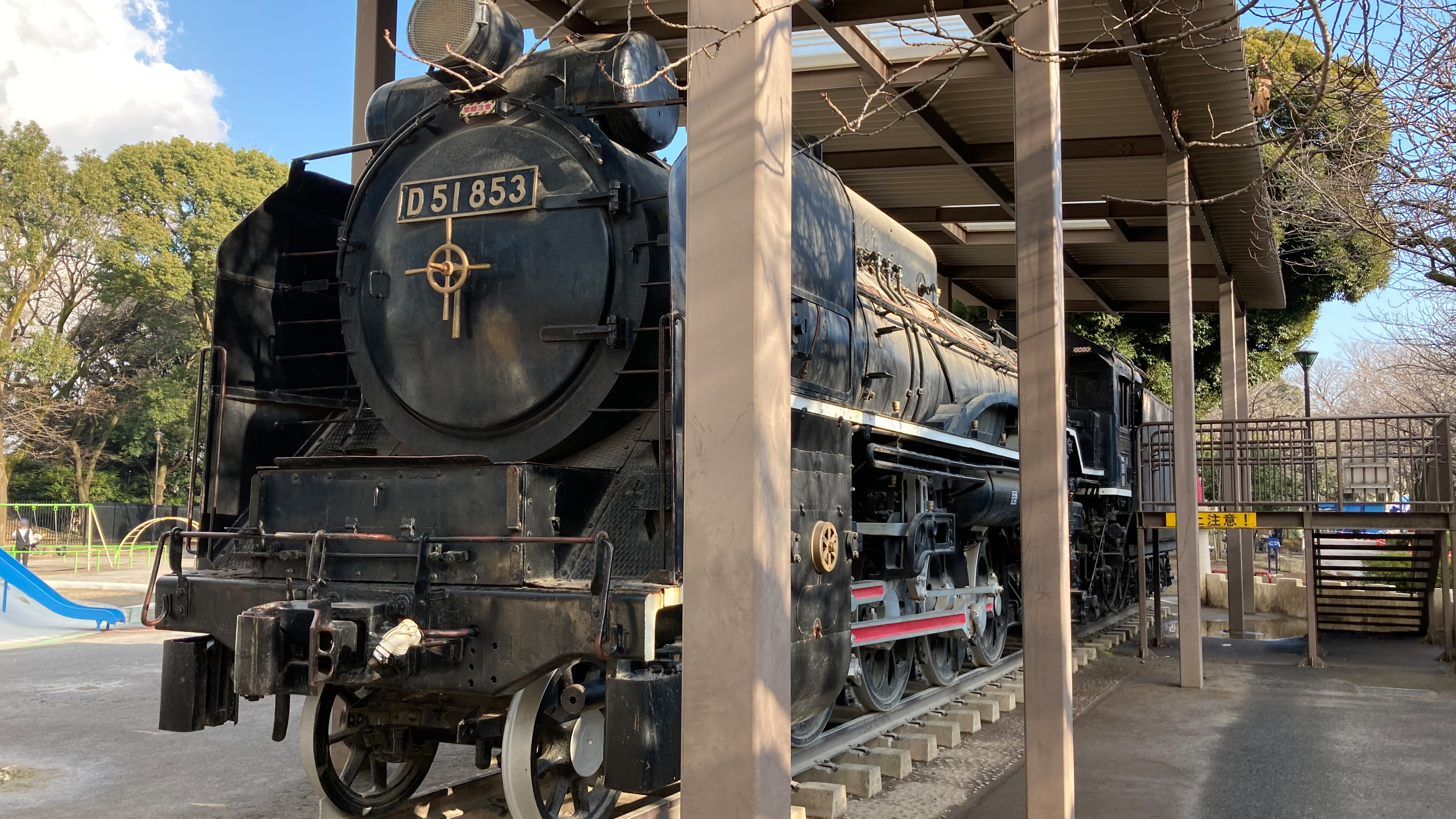
D51 853, February 2021

== Access ==
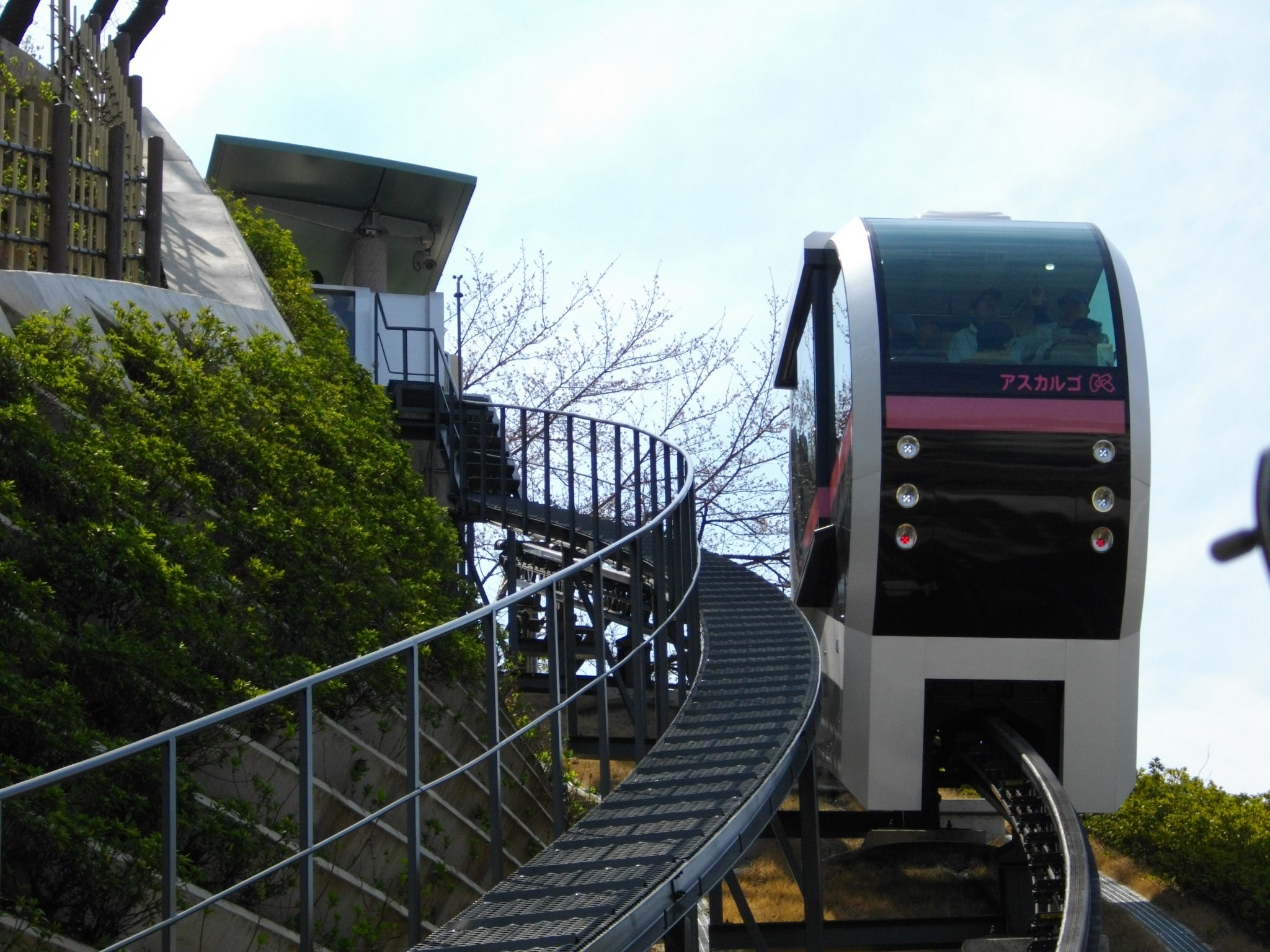
The "Ascargot" car ascending the Asukayama Park Monorail, March 2010

June 2015

June 2015

The closest station to the park is Ōji Station on the JR Keihin-Tohoku Line. A small inclined monorail called the Asukayama Park Monorail (飛鳥山公園モノレール) is provided on the north side of the park to provide access free-of-charge to the park for the mobility-impaired.

== See also ==
- Parks and gardens in Tokyo
- One Hundred Famous Views of Edo (View 17)
