= Gokayama washi =

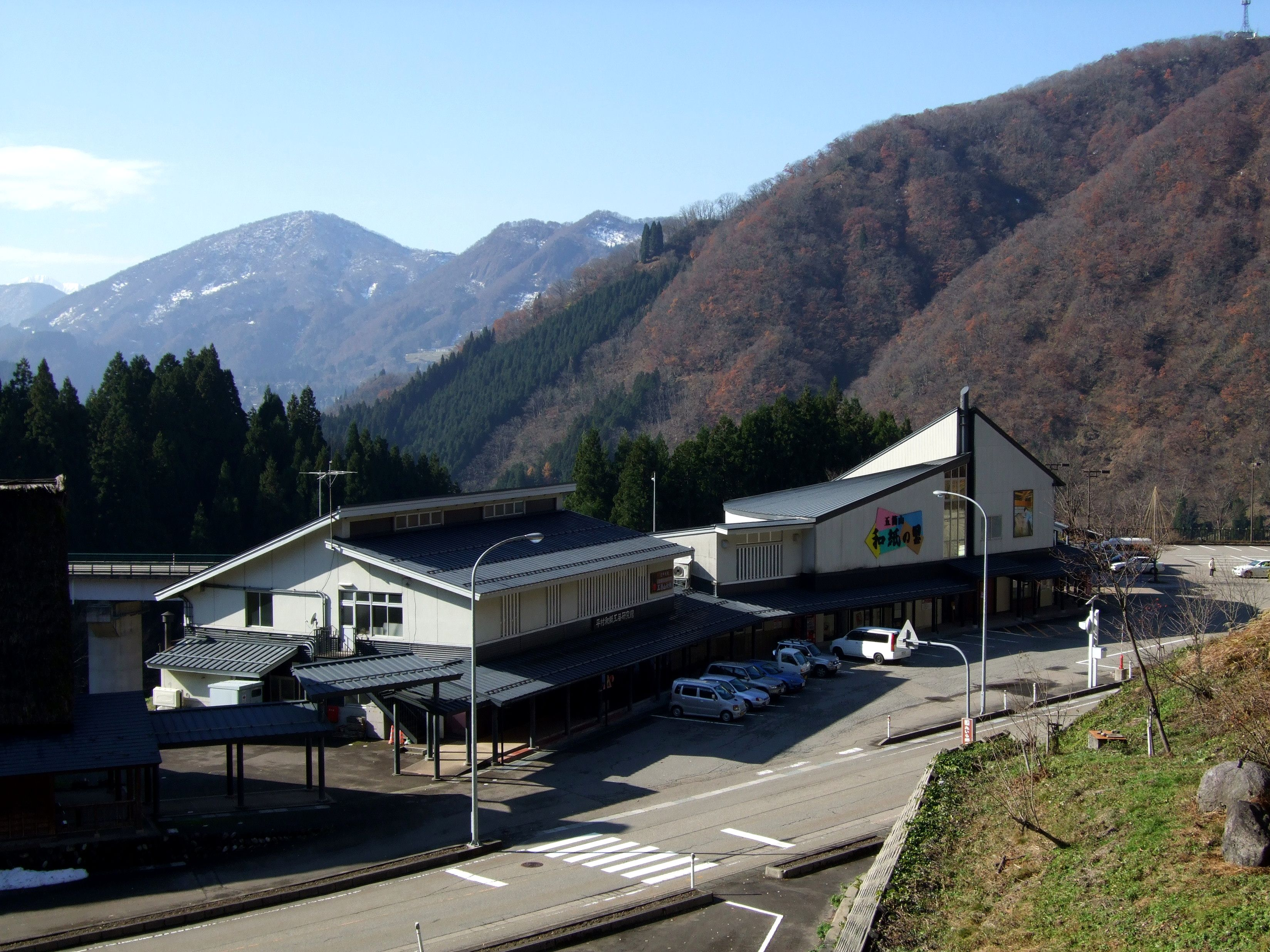
Gokayama Washi Village (Roadside Station Taira)

Gokayama Washi (五箇山和紙) is a traditional Japanese paper (washi) produced in the Gokayama region of Nanto City, Toyama Prefecture, Japan.

During the Edo period, the papermaking technique flourished as it became the official paper (goyōshi) for the Kaga Domain. It is particularly well known for its durability and longevity. Today, the tradition is maintained through the "Gokayama Washi no Sato" (Roadside Station Taira), which focuses on product development and the training of successors.

== Overview ==
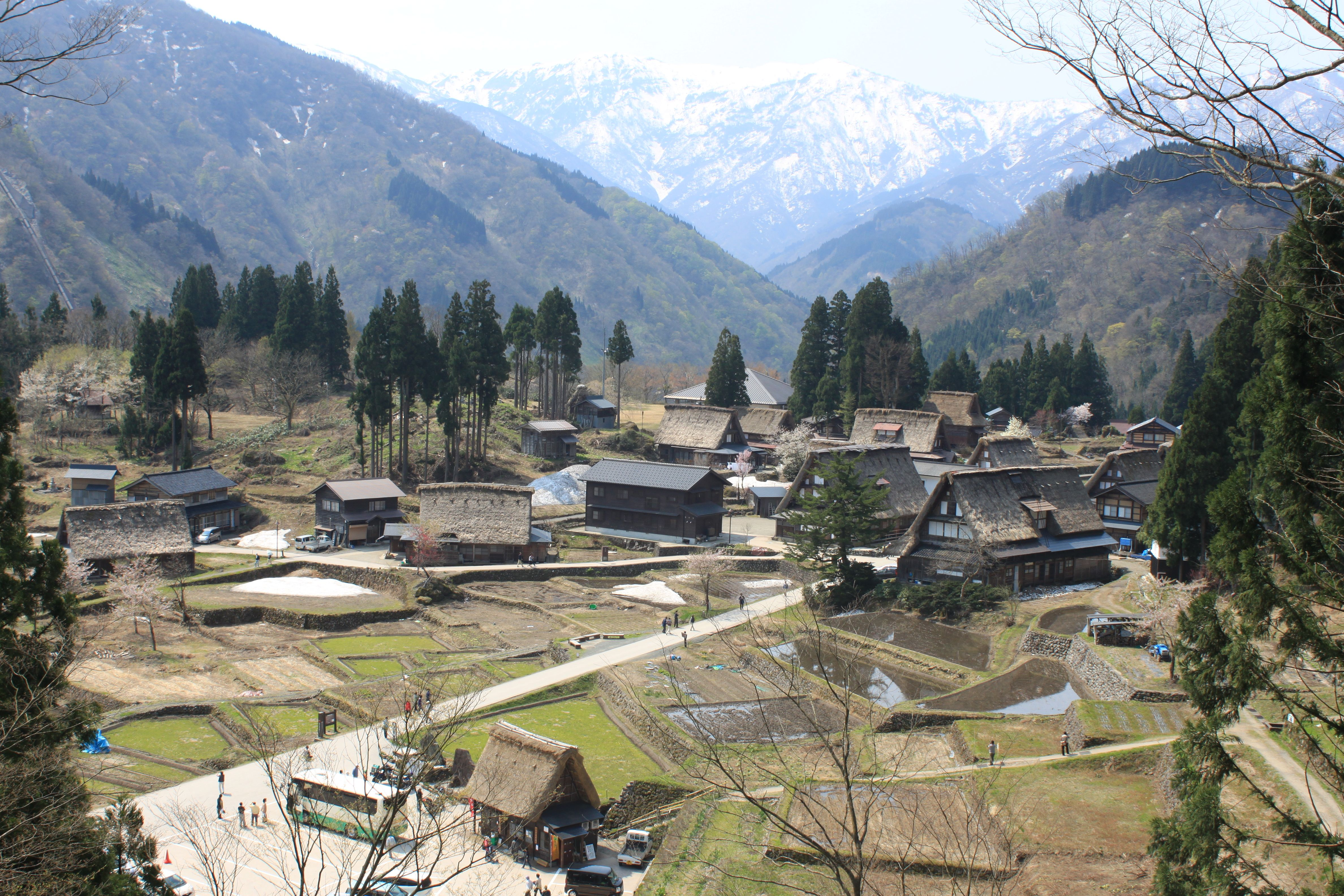
The current World Heritage Site Ainoura Gassho-zukuri Village. There were also Gokayama washi paper mills in Ainokura.

Located in a steep mountainous area, Gokayama has historically struggled with agricultural yield. Consequently, household industries such as gunpowder (enshō) production, sericulture, and papermaking became vital to the local economy. Papermaking, in particular, was an ideal winter industry for the heavy snowfall region, earning it the title of "the primary winter industry."

At its peak during the Edo period, there were 253 papermakers across 45 villages in Gokayama. While Futamata Washi (also from the Kaga Domain) was used for high-end items like domain banknotes, Gokayama Washi was valued for its strength and everyday practicality.

In modern times, its durability is highly regarded for the restoration of cultural properties. It is often sold under the name "Gokayama Yukyūshi" (Eternal Paper of Gokayama), specifically used as the underlayer for repairing historical artifacts.

== History ==
=== Origins ===
While there are no definitive records of its origin, local legend suggests that remnants of the Southern Court who fled to Gokayama during the Nanboku-chō period introduced papermaking techniques. Specifically, the clan of Hata Tokiyoshi, who fought in Echizen Province, is said to have brought methods from Kōzuke Province (modern-day Gunma Prefecture).

As the techniques used in Gokayama share similarities with those of Echizen Washi (from modern-day Echizen, Fukui), the theory that technology was introduced from Echizen is considered highly probable.

=== Expansion of Production ===
By the late Muromachi period, the spread of Jōdo Shinshū Buddhism in the Hokuriku region led to increased demand for paper. The oldest surviving example of Gokayama Washi is believed to be the "Kokoroe-nijyuichi-ka-jo(21rules)”(1501), written by the devout follower Akaono Doshu(赤尾道宗).

In the late 16th century, the region came under the control of Maeda Toshiie of the Kaga Domain. The first documentary evidence of Gokayama Washi appears in the Tenshō era (late 1500s), recording that Ichisuke from Shimonashi Village presented ten bundles of paper to Toshiie.

=== Official Paper of Kaga Domain ===
As production grew, Gokayama Washi attained the status of goyōshi (official paper) for the Kaga Domain. Most of the official paper was nakaorigami (folded paper). The domain established a centralized collection point in Noda Village to oversee the purchase of raw materials (kōzo bark), quality inspection, and distribution. This system remained in place until the Meiji Restoration.

=== Meiji Era and Modern Period ===
Following the Meiji Restoration in 1867, the domain's protection and distribution systems were abolished. Gokayama Washi was forced into the capitalist market, leading to a decline in the number of papermakers as they faced harsh competition from merchants. To protect the industry, the Gokayama Papermaking Company was established in 1883.

Post-World War II, the industry saw a brief resurgence in the 1950s, but the number of practitioners declined steadily during Japan's period of rapid economic growth. Currently, a few organizations, including the "Gokayama Washi no Sato" and local cooperatives, continue to preserve the craft and its traditional techniques.

== See also ==
- Washi
- Gokayama

== Literature ==
- Takakuwa, Keishin (1955). "Washi of Gokayama (五ヶ山の和紙)". Etchu Shidan (越中史壇) (5). Etchu Shidan Kai: 13–18.
- Takakuwa, Keishin (1969). "Washi of Gokayama (五ヶ山の和紙)". Toyama Shidan (富山史壇) (44/45). Etchu Shidan Kai: 157–163.
- Takada, Choki (1965a). "A Study of Paper Produced in Etchu Gokayama, Part 1 (越中五ヶ山産紙考（一）)". Toyama Shidan (富山史壇) (31). Etchu Shidan Kai: 41–47.
- Takada, Choki (1965b). "A Study of Paper Produced in Etchu Gokayama, Part 2 (越中五ヶ山産紙考（二）)". Toyama Shidan (富山史壇) (32). Etchu Shidan Kai: 16–22.
- Takada, Choki (1966). "A Study of Paper Produced in Etchu Gokayama, Part 3 (越中五ヶ山産紙考（三）)". Toyama Shidan (富山史壇) (33). Etchu Shidan Kai: 14–21.
- Taira village History Compilation Committee, ed. (1985). History of Taira village (in Japanese). Taira village.
- Toga village History Compilation Committee, ed. (1999). History of Toga village 2. Toga village.
