= City of Kita Board of Education =

City agency in Kita, Tokyo, Japan

City of Kita Board of Education (北区教育委員会 Kita-ku Kyōiku Iinkai) is a city agency that operates public elementary and middle schools in Kita, Tokyo, Japan.

== Schools ==
=== Junior high schools ===
Junior high schools include:

- Akabane Iwabuchi Junior High School (赤羽岩淵中学校)
- Asuka Junior High School (飛鳥中学校)
- Horifune Junior High School (堀船中学校)
- Inatsuke Junior High School (稲付中学校)
- Jujo Fujimi Junior High School (十条富士見中学校)
- Kamiya Junior High School (神谷中学校)
- Kirigaoka Junior High School (桐ケ丘中学校)
- Meio Junior High School (明桜中学校)
- Ouji Sakura Junior High School (王子桜中学校)
  - Its attendance boundary is: Ōji (王子) 1-4 chōme and 5 chōme 1-4 ban, Higashi Jūjō (東十条) 1-4 chōme, Ōjihonmachi (王子本町) 1-chōme 1-18 and 21-30 ban, Kishimachi 1-chome, and Kamiya 1-chome
- Tabata Junior High School (田端中学校)
- Takinogawa Koyo Junior High School (滝野川紅葉中学校)
- Ukima Junior High School (浮間中学校)

Former junior high schools:

- Akabane Junior High School (赤羽中学校)
- Fujimi Junior High School (富士見中学校)
- Iwabuchi Junior High School (立岩淵中学校)
- Jujo Junior High School (十条中学校)
- Koyo Junior High School (紅葉中学校)
- Shinmachi Junior High School (新町中学校)
- Takinogawa Junior High School (滝野川中学校)

=== Elementary schools ===
Elementary schools:

- No. 4 Iwabuchi Elementary School (第四岩淵小学校)
- Akabane Elementary School (赤羽小学校)
- Akabanedai Elementary School (赤羽台西小学校)
- Fukuro Elementary School (袋小学校)
- Hachiman Elementary School (八幡小学校)
- Higashi-Jujo Elementary School (東十条小学校)
- Horifune Elementary School (堀船小学校)
- Inada Elementary School (稲田小学校)
- Iwabuchi Elementary School (岩淵小学校)
- Jujo Elementary School (十条小学校)
- Kamiya Elementary School (神谷小学校)
- Kirigaokasato Elementary School (桐ケ丘郷小学校)
- Nadeshiko Elementary School (なでしこ小学校)
- Nishigahara Elementary School (西ケ原小学校)
- Nishigaoka Elementary School (西が丘小学校)
- Nishi Ukima Elementary School (西浮間小学校)
- Oji Elementary School (王子小学校)
  - Its attendance boundary is: Ōji 2-4 chōme and 5-chōme 1-4 ban, and Higashi Jūjō 3-chōme 10-ban.
- Oji First Elementary School (王子第一小学校)
- Oji Second Elementary School (王子第二小学校)
- Oji Third Elementary School (王子第三小学校)
- Oji No. 5 Elementary School (王子第五小学校)
- Tabata Elementary School (田端小学校)
- Takinogawa Elementary School (滝野川小学校)
- Takinogawa No. 2 Elementary School (滝野川第二小学校)
- Takinogawa No. 3 Elementary School (滝野川第三小学校)
- Takinogawa No. 4 Elementary School (滝野川第四小学校)
- Takinogawa No. 5 Elementary School (滝野川第五小学校)
- Takinogawa Momiji Elementary School (滝野川もみじ小学校)
- Toshima Wakaba Elementary School (としま若葉小学校)
- Toyokawa Elementary School (豊川小学校)
- Ukima Elementary School (浮間小学校)
- Umenoki Elementary School (梅木小学校)
- Yabata Elementary School (谷端小学校)
- Yanagida Elementary School (柳田小学校)

Former schools

- No. 3 Iwabuchi Elementary School (第三岩淵小学校)
- Akabanedai Nishi Elementary School (赤羽台西小学校)
- Arakawa Elementary School (荒川小学校)
- Jujodai Elementary School (十条台小学校)
- Momiji Elementary School (紅葉小学校)
- Takinogawa No. 1 Elementary School (滝野川第一小学校)
- Takinogawa No. 6 Elementary School (滝野川第六小学校)
- Takinogawa No. 7 Elementary School (滝野川第七小学校)
