= Kita, Tokyo =

Kita 北区
- Special ward
- Kita City
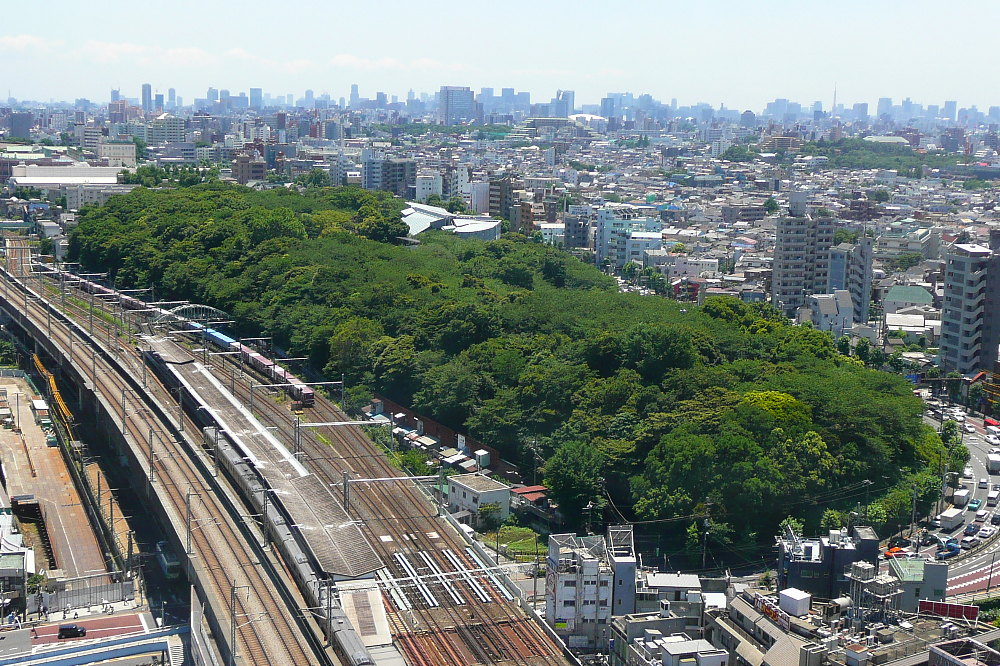
- Asukayama Park in Ōji, Kita, Tokyo

- Flag Emblem

- Location of Kita in Tokyo Metropolis

- Location in Japan Location within Tokyo Metropolis Location within the Special wards of Tokyo
- Coordinates: 35°45′N 139°44′E
- Country: Japan
- Region: Kantō
- Prefecture: Tokyo Metropolis

Government
  - Mayor: Kanako Yamada (from April 27, 2023)

Area
  - Total: 20.61 km^{2} (7.96 sq mi)

Population (October 1, 2020)
  - Total: 355,213
  - Density: 17,234/km^{2} (44,640/sq mi)
- Time zone: UTC+09:00 (JST)
- Website: www.city.kita.tokyo.jp
- Symbols
- Flower: Rhododendron
- Tree: Cherry blossom

Kita (北区, Kita-ku; Japanese pronunciation: [k̟ʲi̥.tä́(.kɯ̈̀)]; lit. 'Northern Ward') is a special ward in the Tokyo Metropolis in Japan. The English translation of its Japanese self-designation is City of Kita. The ward was founded on March 15, 1947.

As of May 1, 2015, the ward has an estimated population of 340,287, and a population density of 16,510 persons per km^{2}. The total area is 20.61 km^{2}.

== Districts and neighborhoods ==
Akabane-Iwabuchi Area (Note: Formerly part of the pre-1946 Ward of Ōji.)

- Akabane
- Akabanedai
- Akabanekita
- Akabaneminami
- Akabanenishi
- Iwabuchimachi
- Kamiya
- Kirigaoka
- Nishigaoka
- Shimo
- Ukima

Ōji Area

- Higashijūjō
- Horifune
- Jūjōdai
- Jūjōnakahara
- Kamijūjō
- Kishimachi
- Nakajūjō
- Ōji
- Ōjihonmachi
- Toshima

Takinogawa Area (Note: Formerly part of the pre-1946 Ward of Takinogawa.)

- Higashitabata
- Kaminakazato
- Nakazato
- Nishigahara
- Sakaemachi
- Shōwachō
- Tabata
- Tabatashin-machi
- Takinogawa

== History ==
The area was a collection of rural villages and towns until the 1880s, when it was connected by rail to central Tokyo (Oji Station opening in 1883). Parts of the area joined Tokyo City in 1932 as the Ōji (former Ōji and Iwabuchi towns) and Takinogawa (former Takinogawa town) Wards. Kita was officially formed in 1947 by the merger of these wards.

== Demographics ==
Historical population
Year	Pop.	±%
1920	96,653	—
1930	227,633	+135.5%
1940	347,771	+52.8%
1945	137,832	−60.4%
1950	267,209	+93.9%
1960	418,603	+56.7%
1970	431,219	+3.0%
1980	387,458	−10.1%
1990	354,647	−8.5%
2000	326,764	−7.9%
2010	335,544	+2.7%
2020	355,213	+5.9%
Source: Censuses (Note: For years prior to 1950, figures cover the area of present-day Kita-ku.)

== Geography ==
The name Kita, meaning "north," reflects the location among the wards of Tokyo. To its north lie the cities of Kawaguchi and Toda in Saitama Prefecture. To the east, south and west lie other special wards: Adachi, Arakawa, Itabashi, Bunkyō, and Toshima.

Four rivers run through Kita:

- Arakawa River
- Shakujii River
- Shingashi River
- Sumida River

== Famous sites ==
- Asukayama Park
- Chūō Park (formerly Camp Oji)
- Kyu-Furukawa Gardens, designated a National Place of Scenic Beauty.
- Nanushi-no-taki Park
- Oji Shrine, one of the Tokyo Ten Shrines (東京十社, Tokyo Jissha).
- Oji Inari shrine
- Ukima Park

== Economy ==
The head office of Seiyu Group is in Kita.

== Education ==
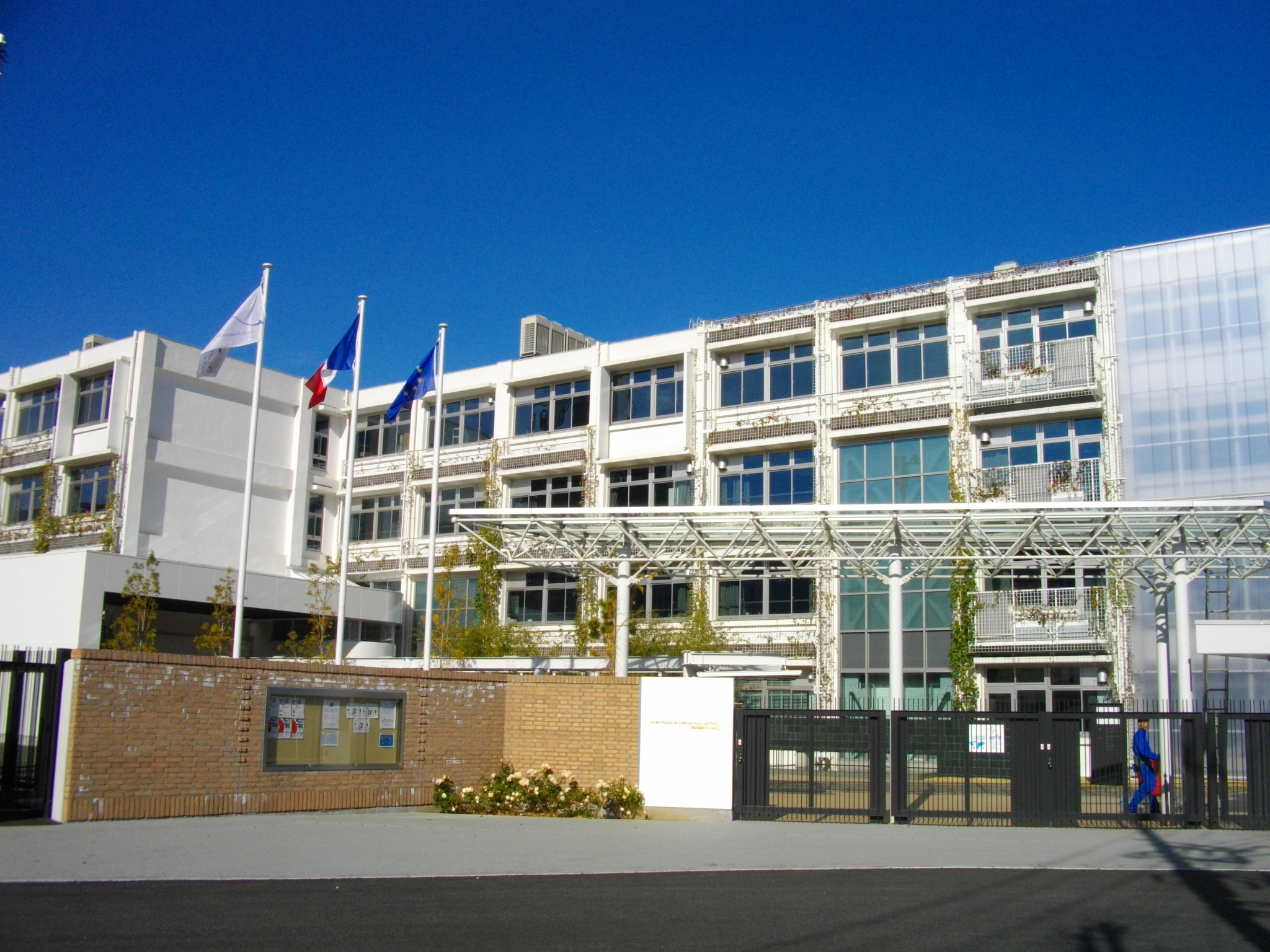
Lycée Français International de Tokyo

The city's public elementary and middle schools are operated by the City of Kita Board of Education.

The city's public high schools are operated by the Tokyo Metropolitan Government Board of Education.

- Asuka High School (東京都立飛鳥高等学校)
- Akabane Commercial High School (東京都立赤羽商業高等学校)
- Kirigaoka High School (東京都立桐ケ丘高等学校)
- Oji Technical High School (東京都立王子総合高等学校)

The following private domestic schools are in the ward:

- Joshi Seigakuin Junior & Senior High School (for girls) – Nakazato
- Seigakuin Junior & Senior High School (for boys) – Nakazato

The following international schools are in the ward:

- École Internationale Franco-Japonaise 東京日仏国際学園 EIFJ Tokyo (French-English-Japanese)
- Lycée Français International de Tokyo (French)
- Tokyo Korean Junior and Senior High School (North Korean)

The following universities are in the ward:

- Tokyo Seitoku University
- Tokyo University of Social Welfare

== Transportation ==
=== Rail ===
- JR East
  - Tōhoku Main Line, Takasaki Line, Utsunomiya Line: Oku, Akabane Stations
  - Saikyō Line (Akabane Line): Itabashi, Jujo, Akabane, Kita Akabane, Ukima Funado Stations
  - Keihin-Tōhoku Line: Tabata, Kami Nakazato, Ōji, Higashi Jujo, Akabane Stations
  - Yamanote Line: Tabata Station
- Tokyo Metropolitan Bureau of Transportation Tokyo Sakura Tram: Nishigahara-yonchome, Takinogawa-ichome, Asukayama, Oji-ekimae, Sakaecho, Kajiwara Stations
- Tokyo Metro Namboku Line: Nishigahara, Ōji, Ōji Kamiya, Shimo, Akabane Iwabuchi Stations
- Saitama Rapid Railway Line (Sainokuni Stadium Line): Akabane-Iwabuchi Station

=== Highways ===
- Shuto Expressway C2 Central Loop (Itabashi JCT – Kasai JCT)
- Route 17 (Nakasendō)

== Notable people from Kita ==
- Kōbō Abe, Japanese writer, playwright, musician, photographer, inventor and novelist
- Kyoko Fukada, model, actress, and singer
- Megumi Hayashibara, seiyuu, musician, singer, writer, radio DJ and TV talk show host, certified nurse
- Hikaru Ijuin, radio and television personality
- Elephant Kashimashi, rock band
- Kiyoshi Kodama, actor and TV personality
- Yuki Chiba, rapper
- Yuichi Nakamaru, singer-songwriter, actor, television personality, radio host, and a member of KAT-TUN
- Kazuya Yoshii, singer-songwriter and musician (The Yellow Monkey)

== International relations ==
Kita has a sister city relationship with Xuanwu District, Beijing, China.

It is also twinned with the following cities in Japan.

- Kanra, Gunma
- Nakanojō, Gunma
- Sakata, Yamagata
