= Tokyo Metro 9000 series =

Electric multiple unit train type operated in Japan

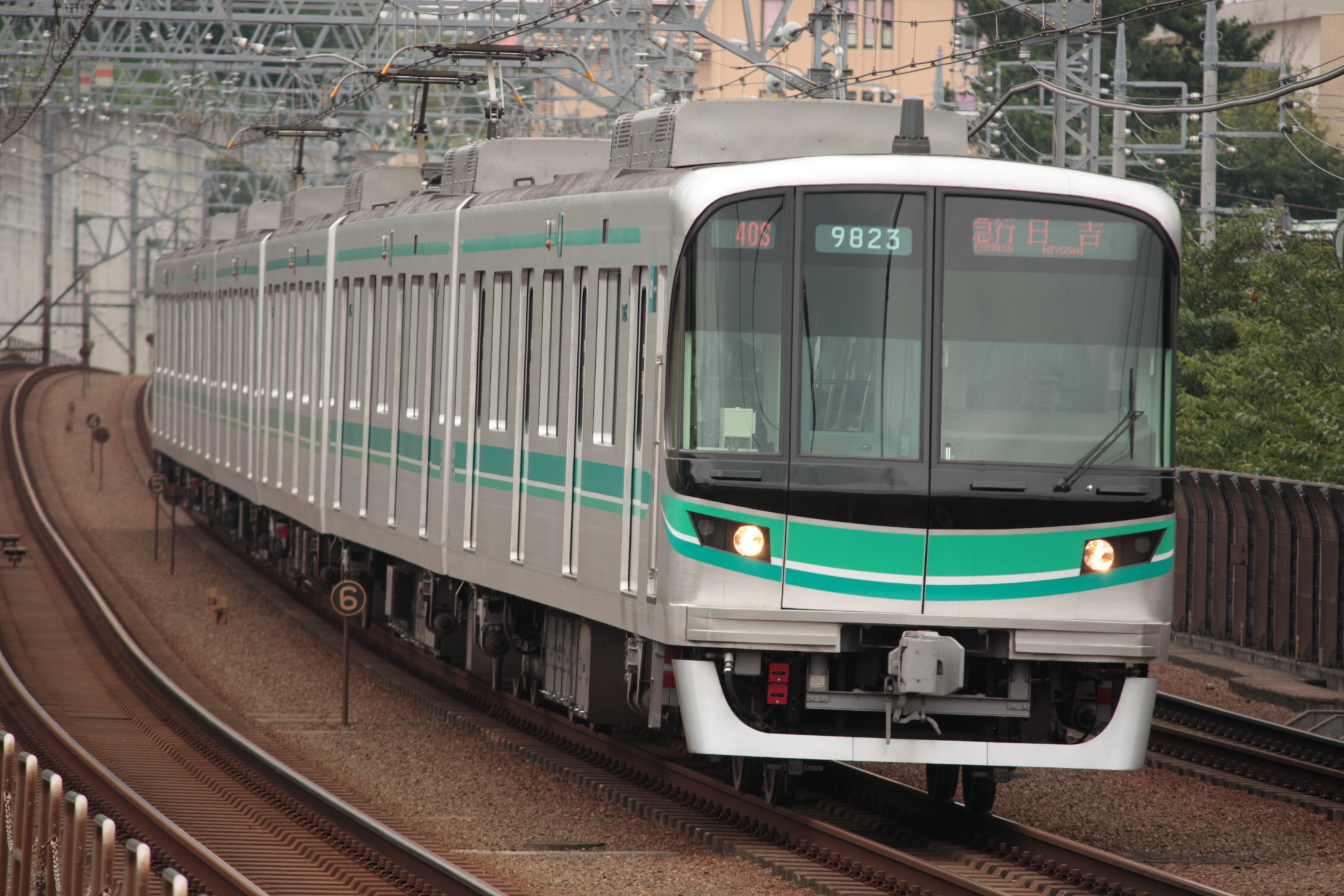
- 5th-batch set 23 on the Tokyu Meguro Line
- In service: 1991–Present
- Manufacturers: Kawasaki Heavy Industries, Nippon Sharyo, Tokyu Car Corporation
- Constructed: 1990, 1991–2009, 2021–
- Entered service: 29 November 1991
- Refurbished: 2016–2019, 2023–
- Number under construction: 24 cars
- Number built: 140 cars (23 sets)
- Number in service: 140 cars (23 sets)
- Formation: 6/8 cars per trainset
- Fleet numbers: 01–23
- Capacity: 882 passengers (6-car set); 1200 passengers (8-car set)
- Operators: Tokyo Metro, previously TRTA
- Depot: Ōji
- Lines served: Tokyo Metro Namboku Line; Saitama Rapid Railway Line; Tokyu Meguro Line; Tokyu Shin-Yokohama Line

Specifications
- Car body construction: Aluminium
- Car length: 20,000 mm (65 ft 7 in)
- Width: 2,830 mm (9 ft 3 in)
- Height: 4,080 mm (13 ft 5 in) (Batches 1–4); 4,042 mm (13 ft 3.1 in) (Batch 5)
- Doors: 4 pairs per side
- Maximum speed: 110 km/h (68 mph)
- Weight: 25.7–33.5 t (25.3–33.0 long tons; 28.3–36.9 short tons)
- Traction system: Batch 1 (A-type): GTO–VVVF (Hitachi or Mitsubishi Electric); Batch 2 (C-type): 3-level IGBT–VVVF (Hitachi); Batch 3 (C-type): IGBT–VVVF (Mitsubishi Electric); Batch 4 (C-type): 2-level IGBT–VVVF (Toshiba); Batch 1 & 2 (B-type refurbishment): SiC-MOSFET–VVVF (Mitsubishi Electric)
- Traction motors: 3-phase AC induction motor
- Power output: 190 kW (250 hp) per motor
- Transmission: Westinghouse Natal (WN) drive; Gear ratio: 7.79 : 1
- Acceleration: 3.3 km/(h⋅s) (2.1 mph/s)
- Deceleration: 3.5 km/(h⋅s) (2.2 mph/s) (service); 4.5 km/(h⋅s) (2.8 mph/s) (emergency)
- Electric systems: 1,500 V DC overhead catenary
- Current collection: Pantograph
- Bogies: SS-122 / SS-022, SS-135B / SS-035B, 5th batch: FS777A
- Braking system: Electronically controlled pneumatic brakes with TRT-11 type regenerative braking
- Safety systems: CS-ATC, ATO, TASC
- Coupling system: Janney coupler
- Track gauge: 1,067 mm (3 ft 6 in)

The Tokyo Metro 9000 series (東京メトロ9000系, Tōkyō Metoro 9000-kei) is an electric multiple unit (EMU) train type operated by the Tokyo subway operator Tokyo Metro on the Tokyo Metro Namboku Line in Tokyo, Japan, since 1991.

== Variants ==
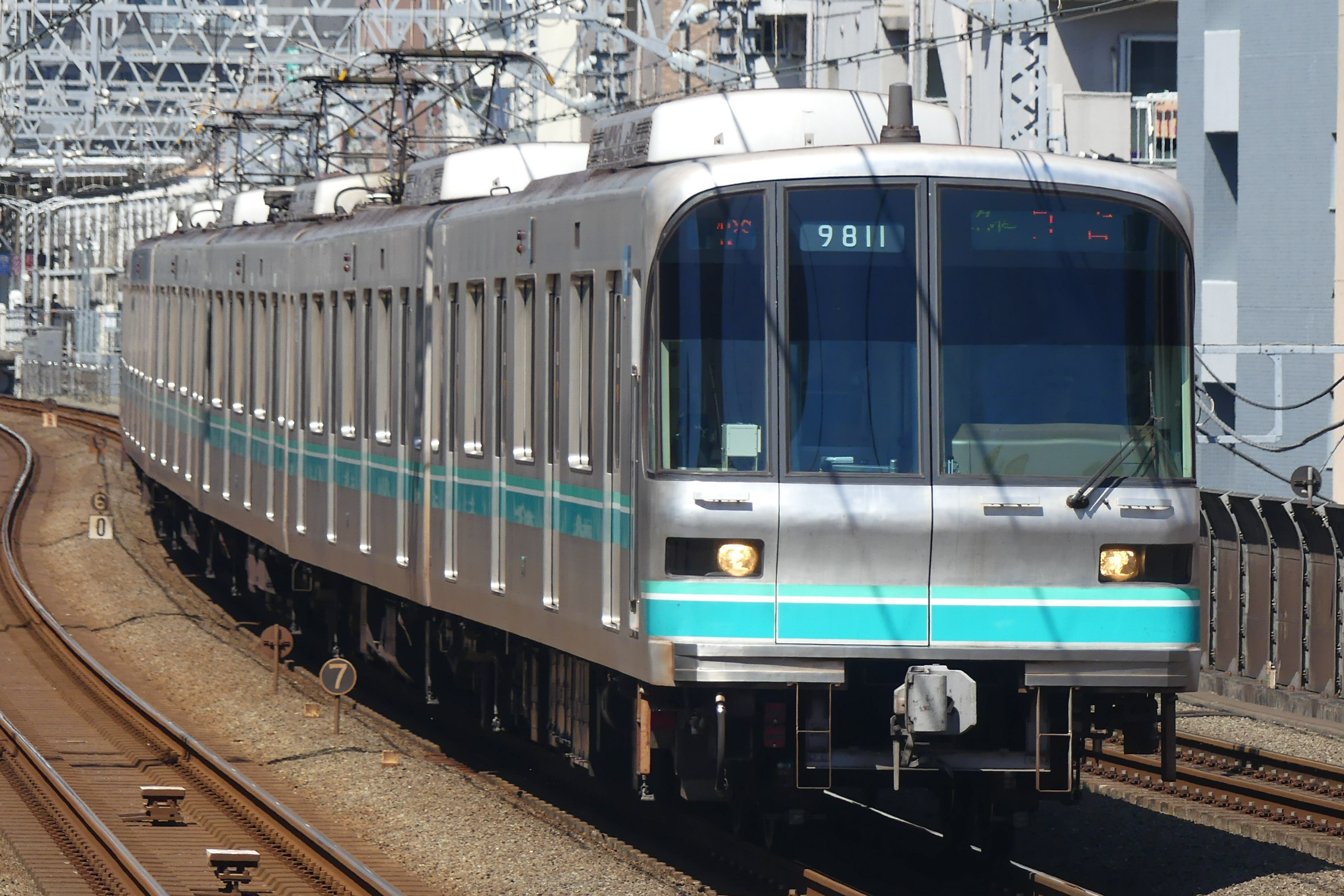
Unrefurbished set 11 in August 2018

Batch	Set numbers	Year built
Prototype	01	1990
1	02-08	1991-1992
2	09-13	1995-1996
3	14-15	1997
4	16-21	1999-2000
5	22-23	2009

As of 1 April 2015, the fleet consists of 23 six-car sets (numbered 01 to 23), all based at Oji depot in Tokyo.

=== Prototype ===
A prototype four-car set was built by Kawasaki Heavy Industries in 1990 (formed of cars 9101-9201-9301-9801) for testing on the Chiyoda Line prior to the opening of the Namboku Line in 1991.

=== 1st batch ===
Full-production four-car sets 02 to 07 were delivered in 1991 ahead of the Namboku Line opening, followed by an additional set in 1992, set 08, to act as a spare.

The original four-car sets were reformed as six-car sets coinciding with the opening of the extension of the line from Yotsuya to Komagome on 26 March 1996. This was achieved by renumbering the centre cars (9200 and 9300) of sets 02, 04, 06, and 08 as 9600 and 9700 cars which were inserted into sets 01, 03, 05, and 07. New-build (2nd batch) intermediate cars (9200-9300-9600-9700) were then inserted into sets 02, 04, 06, and 08. The resulting minor differences led to odd-numbered sets 01 to 07 being classified as "A sets", and even-numbered sets 02 to 08 becoming "B sets".

=== 2nd batch ===
Four new six-car sets (09 to 13), plus the four sets of four additional intermediate cars described above were built by Kawasaki Heavy Industries between 1995 and 1996, coinciding with the opening of the extension of the line from Yotsuya to Komagome in March 1996. Floor height was reduced by 5 mm (0.20 in) compared with the 1st-batch sets from 1,155 to 1,150 mm (45.47 to 45.28 in). Seat width was increased from 440 to 450 mm (17.32 to 17.72 in).

=== 3rd batch ===
Two new six-car sets (14 and 15) were built by Tokyu Car Corporation to coincide with the opening of the extension of the line from Yotsuya to Tameike-Sannō on 20 September 1997. Externally and internally, these were identical to the 2nd-batch trains.

=== 4th batch ===
Six new six-car sets (16 to 21) were built by Nippon Sharyo between 1999 and 2000 ahead of the opening of the extension of the line from Tameike-Sannō to Meguro on 26 September 2000. The motored cars 3 (9300) and 4 (9600) in these sets have only one powered bogie, as opposed to two on earlier sets. Friction stir welding was used in the construction of these sets to produce a more attractive exterior finish.

=== 5th batch ===
Two new six-car sets (22 and 23) entered service from 22 May 2009. These include a number of design improvements over earlier sets, including a redesigned front end, single-arm pantographs, and improved air-conditioning. The number of motored cars is reduced from four to three per 6-car set, with car 3 (trailer car) numbered in the 9400 series. Car 4 (9600) has both bogies powered. Seat width is increased by 10 mm (0.39 in) to 460 mm (18.1 in), and floor height is reduced by 10 mm (0.39 in) to 1,140 mm (44.88 in).

== Formations ==
=== Sets 01 to 21 ===
The 1st to 4th batch sets (01-21) are formed identically as follows, with four motored ("M") cars and two non-powered trailer ("T") cars, and car 1 at the northern end. Motored cars 3 and 4 in sets 16 to 21 each have only one motored bogie.

Car No.	1	2	3	4	5	6
Designation	CT1	M1'	M2'	M1	M2	CT2
Numbering	91xx	92xx	93xx	96xx	97xx	98xx

- Cars 2 and 4 each have two lozenge-type pantographs.
- Cars 2 and 5 have wheelchair spaces.
- Car 4 is designated as a "mildly air-conditioned" car.

=== Sets 22 and 23 ===
The two fifth-batch sets are formed as follows, with three motored ("M") cars and three non-powered trailer ("T") cars, and car 1 at the northern end.

Car No.	1	2	3	4	5	6
Designation	CT1	M1'	T	M1	M2	CT2
Numbering	912x	922x	942x	962x	972x	982x

- Car 2 has one single-arm pantograph, and car 4 has two.
- Cars 2 and 5 have wheelchair spaces.
- Car 4 is designated as a "mildly air-conditioned" car.

== Interior ==
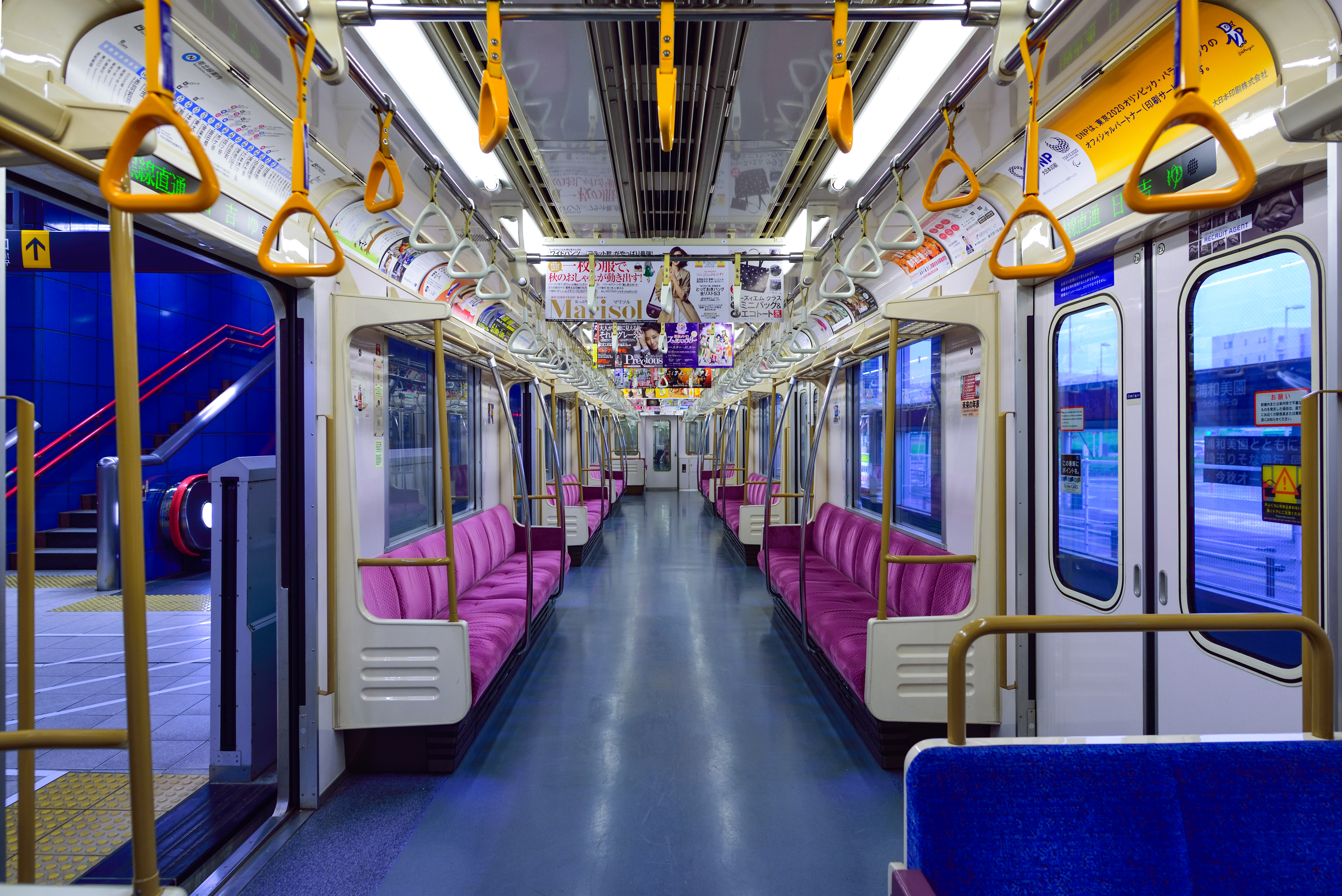
Interior of a prototype car, September 2017

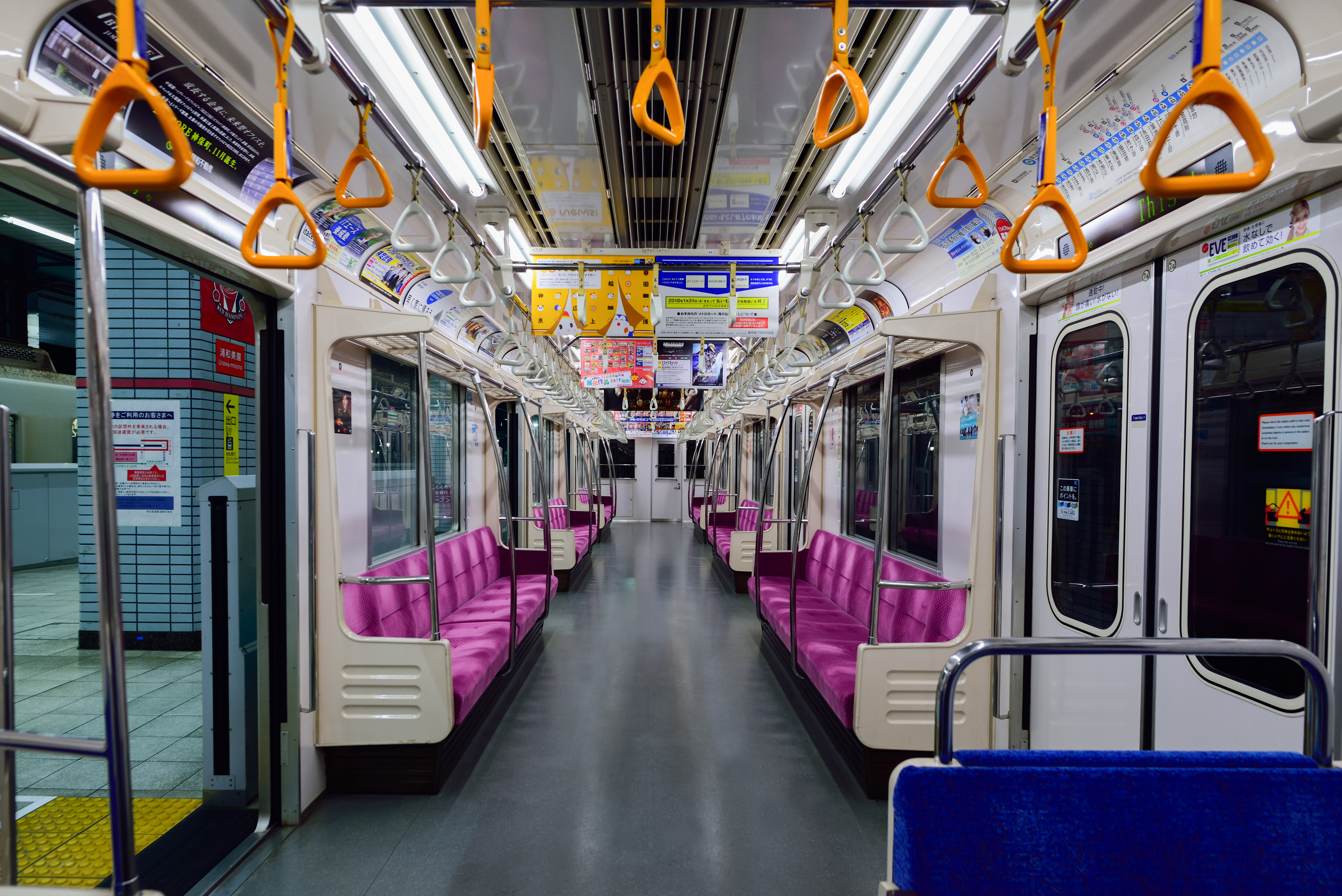
Interior of a 1st batch set, October 2017

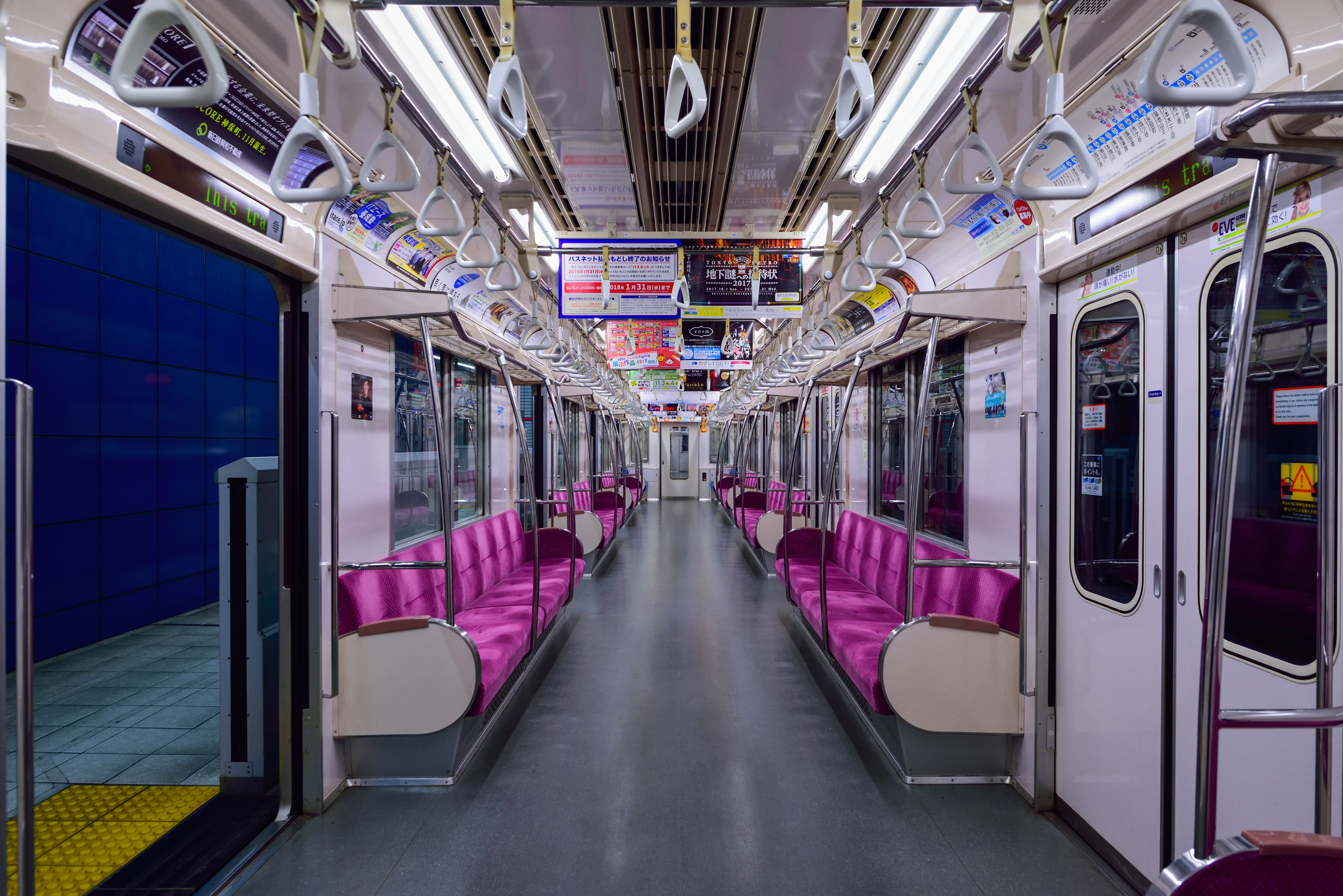
Interior of a 2nd batch set, October 2017

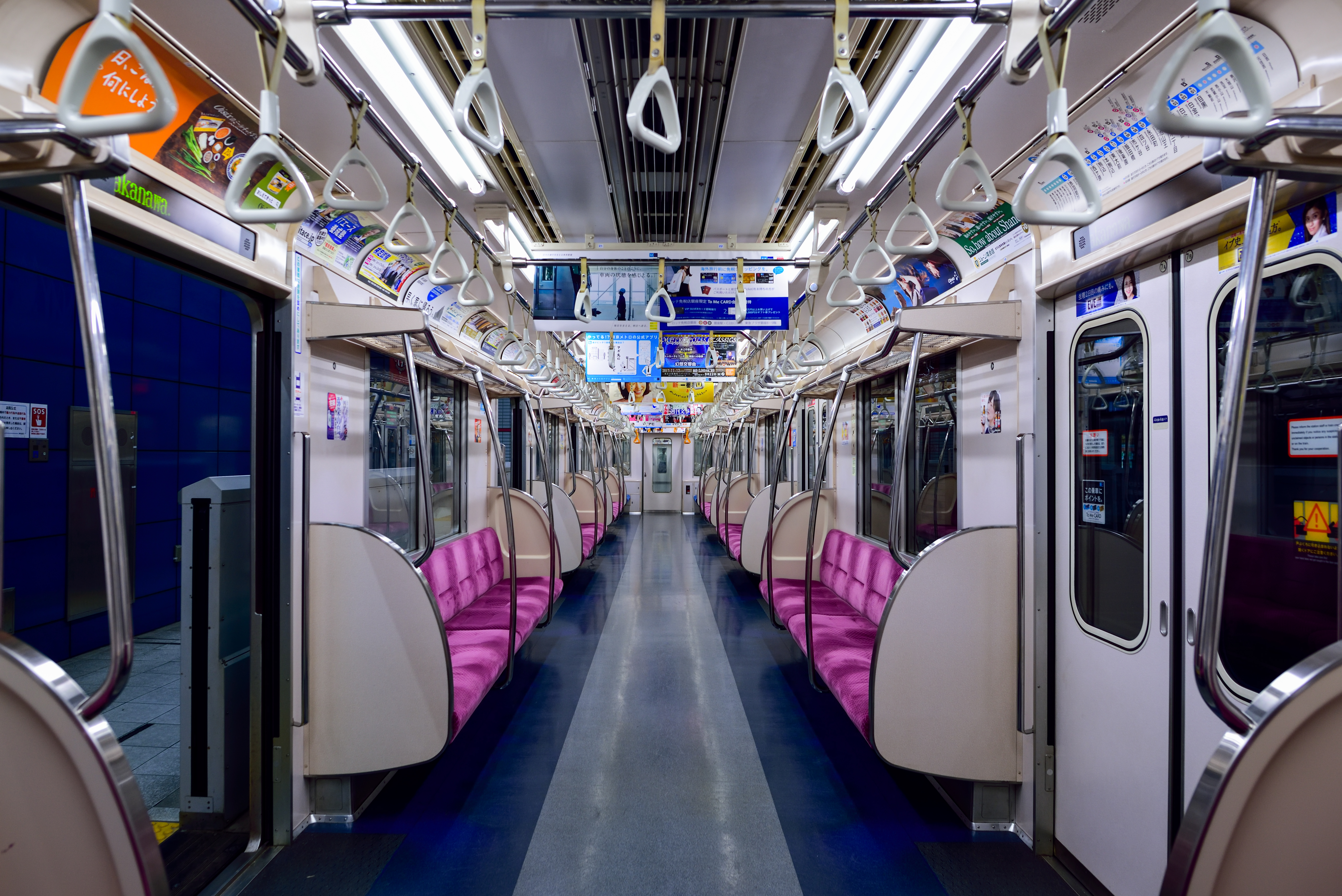
Interior of a 4th batch set, September 2017

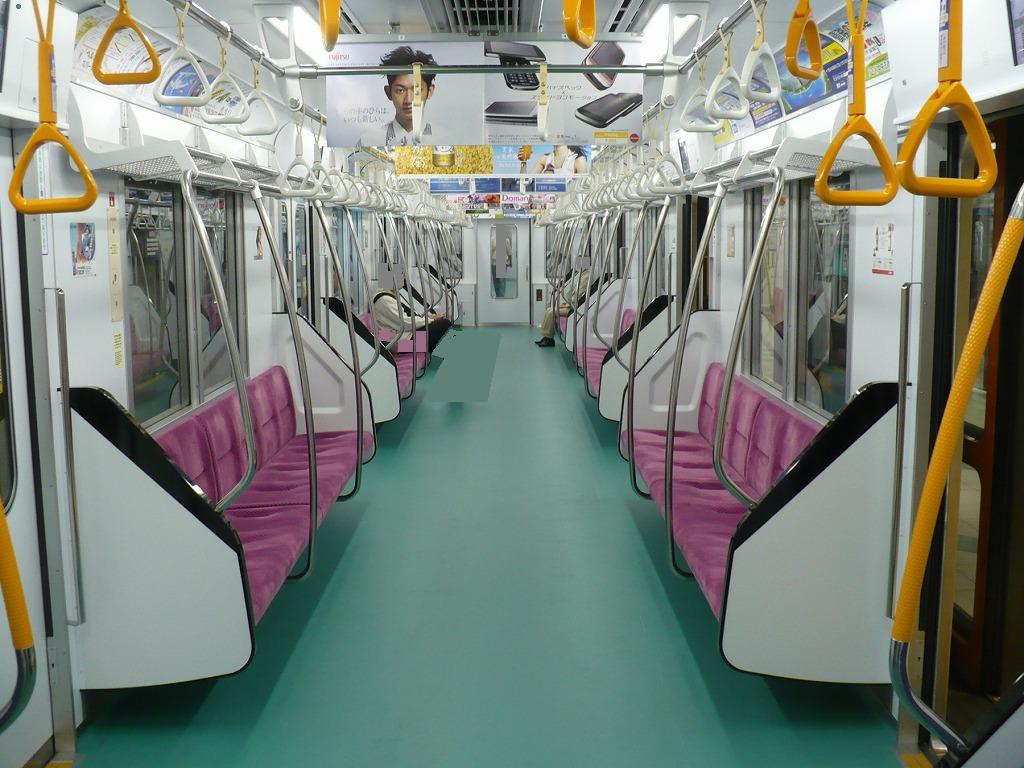
Interior of a 5th batch set

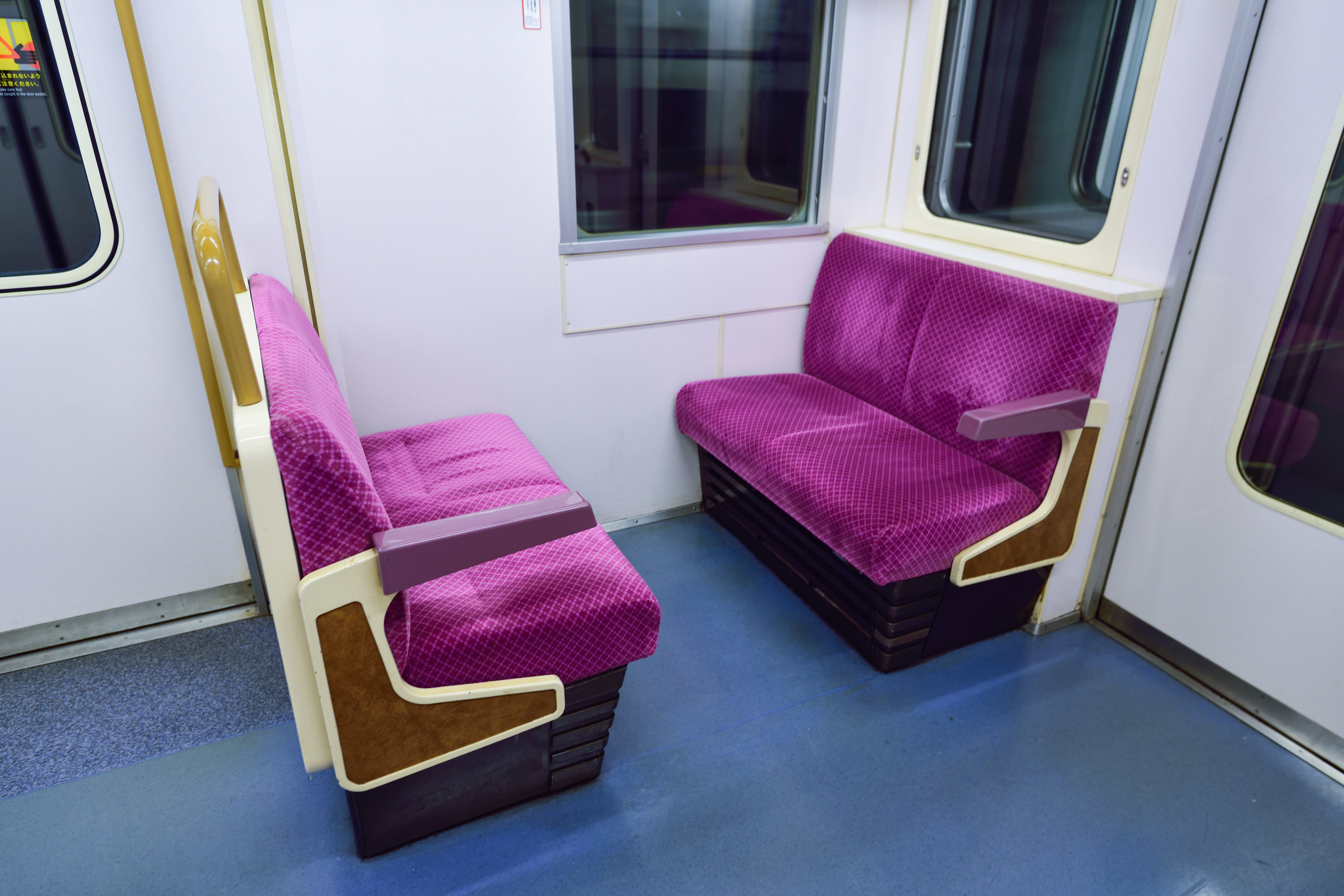
A transverse seating bay at the end of a prototype car, September 2017

== Refurbishment ==
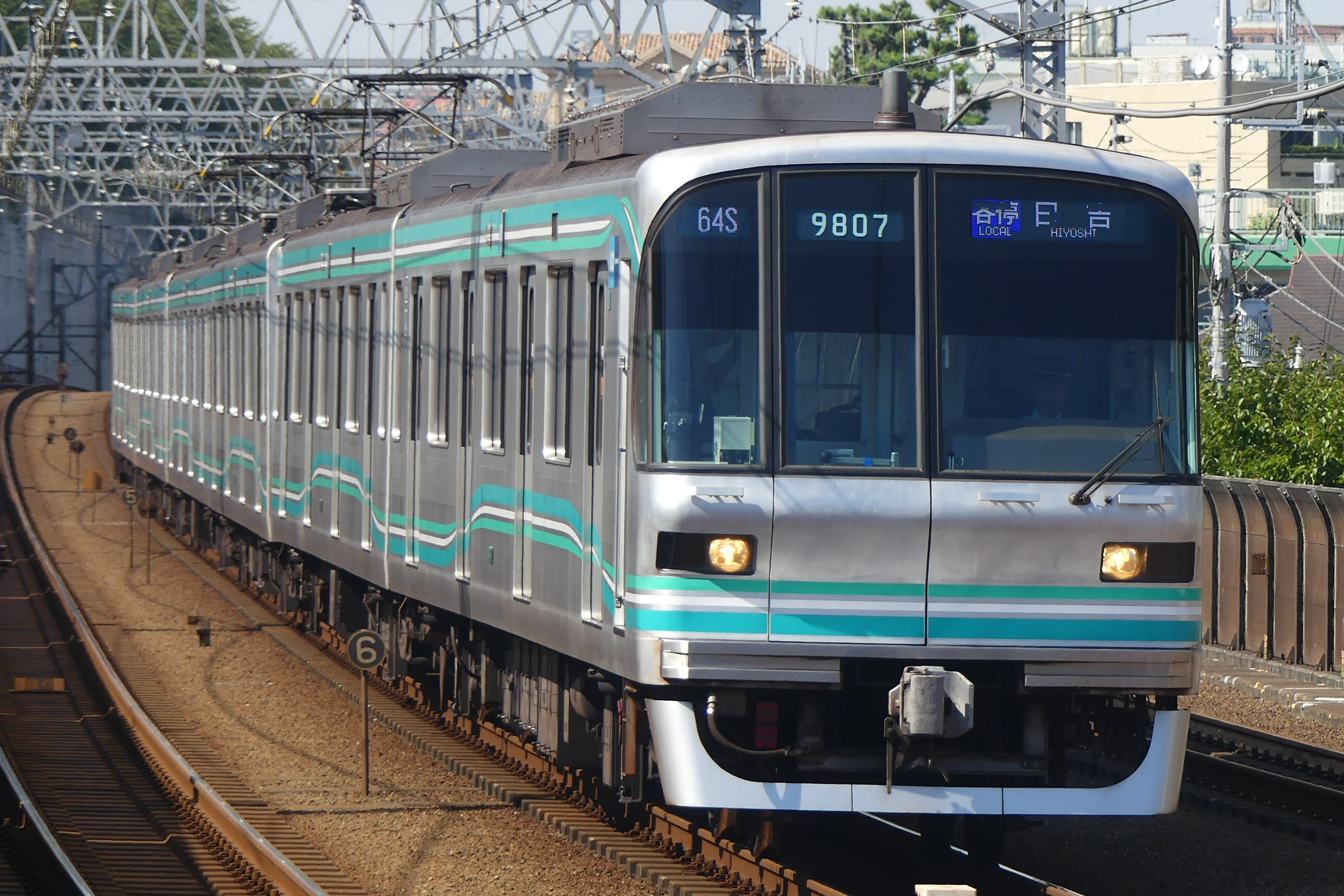
Refurbished set 07 in August 2018

The early sets (01 to 08) are scheduled to undergo a programme of refurbishment from 2016, with the first treated sets returning to service from August 2016. Internally, the transverse seating bays at the ends of cars will be replaced by longitudinal bench seats, and wheelchair spaces will be added to one end of each car. Externally, the refurbished sets will receive a revised livery with wavy turquoise and white stripes at waist height and shoulder height to make the line colour more visible at stations with platform edge doors. The refurbishment programme of the older sets was completed in 2018 with set 08 completing refurbishment on 20 November of that year.

=== Lengthening ===
In 2021, Tokyo Metro announced that it would lengthen 9000 series sets from 6 cars to 8 cars per set from 2022 as a means to mitigate congestion on the Namboku Line.

In October 2021, two intermediate cars, numbered 9409 and 9509, were delivered from Kawasaki Heavy Industries' Hyogo plant.

In May 2023, set 9109 was sent to the depot at Shin-Kiba where it was reformed into an eight-car set. On 13 December 2023, Tokyo Metro announced that set 9109 would enter service on 16 December, and that 13 sets (sets 09–21) will be lengthened to 8-car sets using newly built cars. All additional cars will be built by Kawasaki, and are based on the newer Tokyo Metro 16000 series. The original cars are also being refurbished similarly to previously refurbished sets, with new signage, security features, and a more compact auxiliary power supply. A wheelchair accessible "free space" has also been added to every car. Tokyo Metro Rolling Stock Department Design Division Assistant Manager Tomoya Wantanabe said that the newly renovated sets would be used for 20–25 years.

== Equipment ==
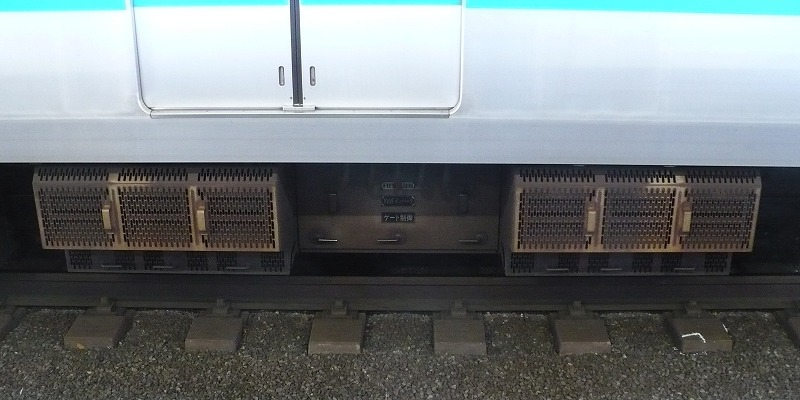
VVVF inverter of the 9000 series

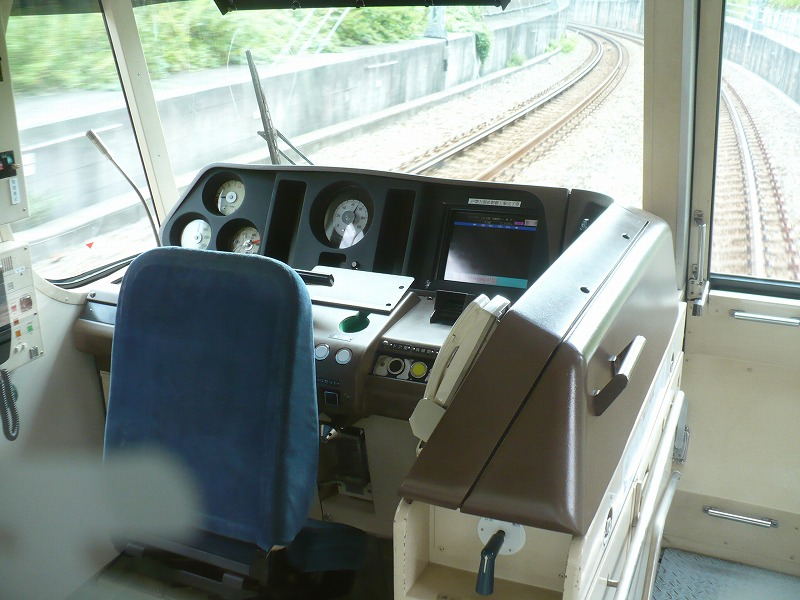
Driver's cab of the 9000 series

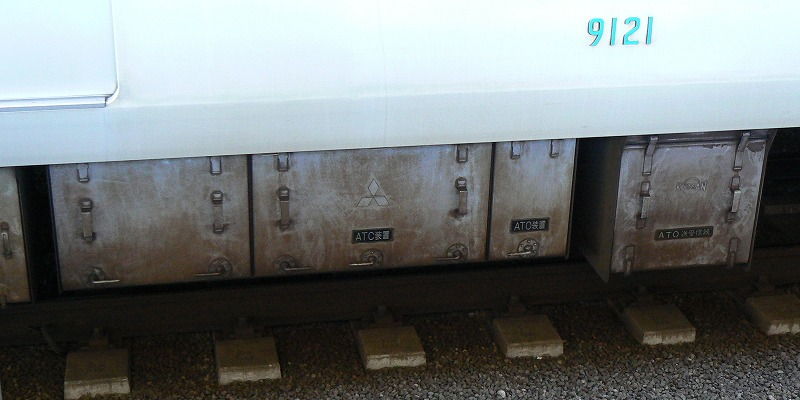
ATC and ATO underside equipment of the 9000 series

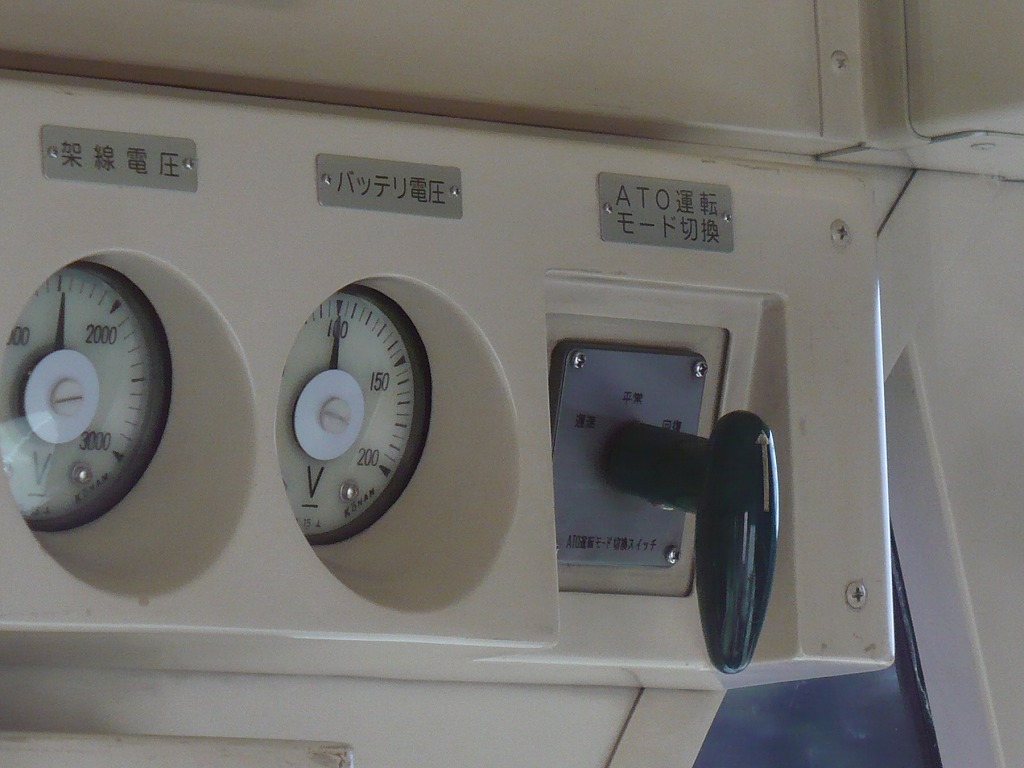
The black knob allows the driver to switch the mode of the operation between automatic and manual.

== See also ==
- Tokyu 3000 series 8-car EMUs
- Tokyu 3020 series 8-car EMUs
- Tokyu 5080 series 8-car EMUs
- Saitama Rapid Railway 2000 series 6-car EMUs
- Sotetsu 21000 series 8-car EMUs
