= Namboku Line (Tokyo Metro) =

Subway line in Tokyo, Japan

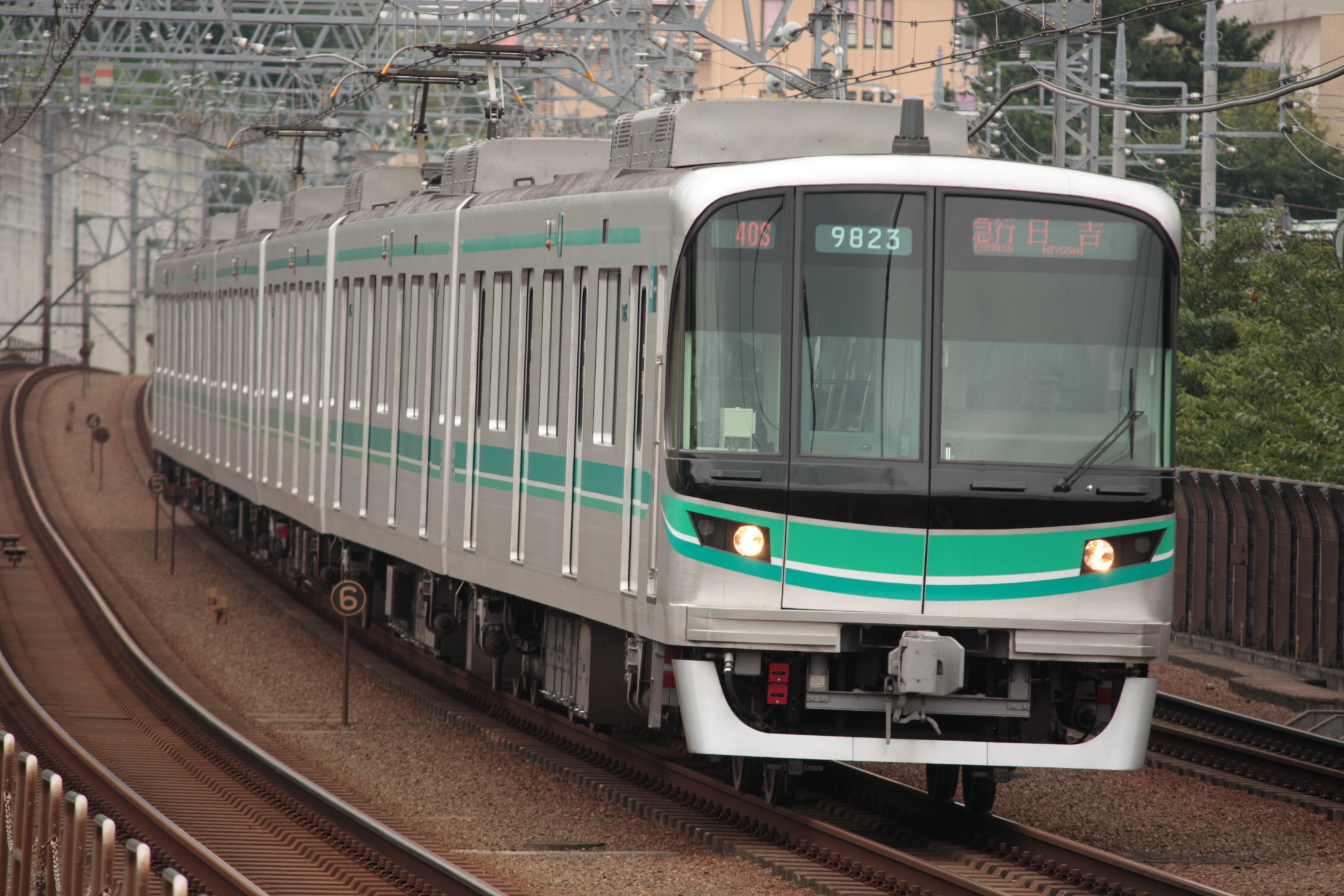
- A Namboku Line 9000 series train

Overview
- Other name: Line 7
- Native name: 南北線
- Status: In service
- Owner: Tokyo Metro Co., Ltd.
- Line number: N
- Locale: Tokyo
- Termini: Meguro; Akabane-iwabuchi
- Stations: 19
- Color on map: Emerald

Service
- System: Tokyo subway (Tokyo Metro)
- Operator(s): Tokyo Metro Co., Ltd.
- Depot: Ōji
- Rolling stock: Tokyo Metro 9000 series; Saitama Rapid Railway 2000 series; Tokyu 3000 series; Tokyu 5080 series; Tokyu 3020 series; Sotetsu 21000 series
- Daily ridership: 522,736 (2017)

History
- Opened: 29 November 1991; 34 years ago
- Last extension: 2000

Technical
- Line length: 21.3 km (13.2 mi)
- Num of tracks: 2
- Track gauge: 1,067 mm (3 ft 6 in)
- Minimum radius: 160.351 m (526.09 ft)
- Electrification: Overhead line, 1,500 V DC
- Operating speed: 80 km/h (50 mph)
- Train protection system: New CS-ATC, ATO
- Maximum incline: 3.5%
Route map

The Namboku Line (南北線, Nanboku-sen; South-North Line) is a subway line owned and operated by Tokyo Metro in Tokyo, Japan. The line runs between Meguro in Shinagawa and Akabane-Iwabuchi in Kita. The Namboku Line was referred to as Line 7 during the planning stages, thus the seldom-used official name is Line 7 Namboku Line (7号線南北線, Nana-gō-sen Nanboku-sen).

On maps, diagrams and signboards, the line is shown using the color emerald (previously coded "teal"), and its stations are given numbers using the letter "N".

The 21.3 km (13.2 mi) Namboku Line is one of Tokyo Metro's newer lines, featuring advanced technology including full automatic train operation and platform screen doors.

== Overview ==
Trains run through onto the Tokyu Meguro Line for Hiyoshi and the Saitama Railway's Saitama Rapid Railway Line (which is essentially a separately-owned extension of the Namboku Line) for Urawa-Misono.

The right-of-way and stations between Shirokane-Takanawa and Meguro are shared with the Toei Mita Line – a unique situation on the Tokyo subway where both operators share common infrastructure. Under an agreement between Tokyo Metro and the Tokyo Metropolitan Government, the fare for this section is calculated on the Toei Subway fare system for passengers traveling to stations on the Mita Line past Shirokane-Takanawa, on the Metro fare system for passengers traveling to stations on the Namboku Line past Shirokane-Takanawa, and on the system "most beneficial to the passenger" (presently the Metro schedule) for travel solely on the shared sector.

On maps, diagrams and signboards, the Namboku Line is shown using the color emerald (▉), and its stations are given numbers using the letter "N".

== History ==
=== Planning ===
Although the line was originally approved in 1962 as Line 7 (Meguro – Iikurakatamachi – Nagatacho – Ichigaya – Komagome – Oji – Akabanecho), construction did not begin until 1986.

Based on this proposal, the Teito Rapid Transit Authority (TRTA) applied for a license to construct Local Railway Line No. 7 between Kami-Osaki (Meguro) and Akabane-cho (present-day Kirigaoka), a distance of 22.5 km. Although the terminus designated in the urban planning route was Iwabuchi-cho (present-day Akabane-Iwabuchi), the application extended the proposed line to Kirigaoka (then known as Akabane-cho 5-chome) to allow for the operation of a spur line to a train depot for passenger services. However, on June 4, 1964, the Tokyo Metropolitan Government also applied for a license to construct Local Railway Line No. 7 between Meguro and Akabane, a distance of 21.0 km. This resulted in a competitive situation between the two proposed routes.

In the 1972 Report No. 15 of the Urban Transportation Council, the proposed extension toward Saitama Prefecture, which had previously been designated for future consideration, was revised to run between the central part of Kawaguchi and the eastern part of Urawa. Subsequently, the 1985 Report No. 7 of the Transportation Policy Council called for the section between Meguro and Kiyoshōkō-mae (present-day Shirokane-takanawa Station) to be shared with Line 6 (the Toei Mita Line). The proposed route within Saitama Prefecture was also revised to run via central Hatogaya, Higashi-Kawaguchi, and onward to eastern Urawa. Of these proposed routes, the section between Meguro and Akabane-Iwabuchi was progressively opened as the Namboku Line. The section between Akabane-Iwabuchi and Urawa-Misono subsequently opened as the Saitama Rapid Railway Line.

Although the line had been planned since the 1960s, the project was temporarily suspended due to issues surrounding the planned train depot in Nishigaoka, Kita, Tokyo. On April 20, 1984, 22 years after the initial license application, the full-line railway construction license was finally granted. Construction began in 1986, and the line opened in stages beginning in 1991, with the entire line completed in 2000. As a relatively late addition to Tokyo's railway network, the Namboku Line is characterized by its generally deep underground stations.

Under the original construction plan, the first phase was to cover the section between Komagome and Akabane-Iwabuchi, while the second phase was to cover the section between Meguro and Komagome. However, the second phase was subsequently divided into two sections: Tameike-Sanno–Komagome (Phase 2-1) and Meguro–Tameike-Sanno (Phase 2-2). As a result, construction was ultimately carried out in three sections.

Construction of the first-phase section proceeded without major delays. The second-phase sections, however, were delayed by the excavation of archaeological sites, including Edo-period remains discovered between Tameike-Sanno and Iidabashi, as well as opposition and NIMBYs from local residents, particularly in the vicinity of Shirokanedai Station. Consequently, the planned date for completion of the entire line was substantially postponed, from September 1995 to September 2000.

=== Opening ===
The first segment from Komagome to Akabane-Iwabuchi opened on 29 November 1991.

The line initially operated with four-car EMUs. Upon its extension to Yotsuya in March 1996, the formations were extended to six cars. On 1 April 2022, eight-car trains began operating on the line.

The extension to Tameike-Sannō was completed in September 1997, and the last stretch from Tameike-Sanno to Meguro was completed on 26 September 2000, when through service to the Tokyu Meguro Line started. Through service with the Saitama Rapid Railway Line commenced when it opened in March 2001 and accommodated traffic to and from Saitama Stadium during the 2002 World Cup. Although the Saitama Line is more or less a northern extension of the Namboku Line, it nevertheless remains a private entity to which the Namboku Line offers through services with.

The Namboku Line was inherited by Tokyo Metro after the privatization of the Teito Rapid Transit Authority (TRTA) in 2004.

Effective the timetable revision on 18 March 2023, through services onto the Sagami Railway commenced courtesy of the Tokyu and Sotetsu Shin-Yokohama Line. Most southbound services past Hiyoshi continue as far south as Shin-Yokohama and Ebina.

== Stations ==
List of Namboku line stations

- All stations are located in Tokyo.
- All services stop at all stations.

Station No.	Station	Japanese	Distance (km)		Transfers	Location
Station No.	Station	Japanese	Between stations	From N-01	Transfers	Location
↑ Through-services to/from: ↑: Okusawa, Musashi-Kosugi, Hiyoshi via Meguro Line; Shin-Yokohama via Tōkyū Shin-Yokohama Line; Nishiya via Sōtetsu Shin-Yokohama Line; Yamato, Ebina via Sōtetsu Main Line; Shōnandai via Sōtetsu Izumino Line
N-01	Meguro	目黒 (Note: Meguro is shared by Toei, Tokyo Metro, and Tokyu Corporation; Tokyu Corporation manages the station.)	–	0.0	Meguro Line (MG01); Mita Line (I-01; shared); Yamanote Line (JY22)	Shinagawa
N-02	Shirokanedai	白金台 (Note: Shirokanedai and Shirokane-Takanawa are shared by Toei and Tokyo Metro; Tokyo Metro manages both stations.)	1.3	1.3	Mita Line (I-02; shared)	Minato
N-03	Shirokane-takanawa	白金高輪	1.0	2.3	Mita Line (I-03; shared)	Minato
N-04	Azabu-juban	麻布十番	1.3	3.6	Ōedo Line (E-22)	Minato
N-05	Roppongi-itchome	六本木一丁目	1.2	4.8	Hibiya Line (Roppongi: H-04) Ōedo Line (Roppongi: E-23)	Minato
N-06	Tameike-sanno	溜池山王	0.9	5.7	Ginza Line (G-06); Marunouchi Line (Kokkai-gijidomae: M-14); Chiyoda Line (Kokkai-gijidomae: C-07)	Chiyoda
N-07	Nagatacho	永田町	0.9	6.6	Yūrakuchō Line (Y-16); Hanzōmon Line (Z-04); Ginza Line (Akasaka-mitsuke: G-05); Marunouchi Line (Akasaka-mitsuke: M-13)	Chiyoda
N-08	Yotsuya	四ツ谷	1.3	7.9	Marunouchi Line (M-12); Chūō Line (JC04); Chūō–Sōbu Line (JB14)	Shinjuku
N-09	Ichigaya	市ケ谷	1.0	8.9	Yūrakuchō Line (Y-14); Shinjuku Line (S-04); Chūō–Sōbu Line (JB15)	Shinjuku
N-10	Iidabashi	飯田橋	1.1	10.0	Tōzai Line (T-06); Yūrakuchō Line (Y-13); Ōedo Line (E-06); Chūō–Sōbu Line (JB16)	Shinjuku
N-11	Korakuen	後楽園	1.4	11.4	Marunouchi Line (M-22); Mita Line (Kasuga: I-12); Ōedo Line (Kasuga: E-07)	Bunkyō
N-12	Todaimae	東大前	1.3	12.7		Bunkyō
N-13	Hon-komagome	本駒込	0.9	13.6		Bunkyō
N-14	Komagome	駒込	1.4	15.0	Yamanote Line (JY10)	Toshima
N-15	Nishigahara	西ケ原	1.4	16.4		Kita
N-16	Ōji	王子	1.0	17.4	Keihin–Tōhoku Line (JK36); Toden Arakawa Line (Oji-ekimae: SA16)	Kita
N-17	Oji-kamiya	王子神谷	1.2	18.6		Kita
N-18	Shimo	志茂	1.6	20.2		Kita
N-19	Akabane-iwabuchi	赤羽岩淵 (Note: Akabane-iwabuchi is shared by Tokyo Metro and Saitama Rapid Railway; Tokyo Metro manages the station.)	1.1	21.3	Saitama Railway Line (SR19)	Kita
↓ Through-services to/from Hatogaya, Urawa-Misono via Saitama Railway Line ↓

== Rolling stock ==
- Tokyo Metro 9000 series 6/8-car EMUs
- Tokyu 3000 series 8-car EMUs
- Tokyu 5080 series 8-car EMUs
- Tokyu 3020 series 8-car EMUs
- Saitama Rapid Railway 2000 series 6-car EMUs
- Sotetsu 21000 series 8-car EMUs
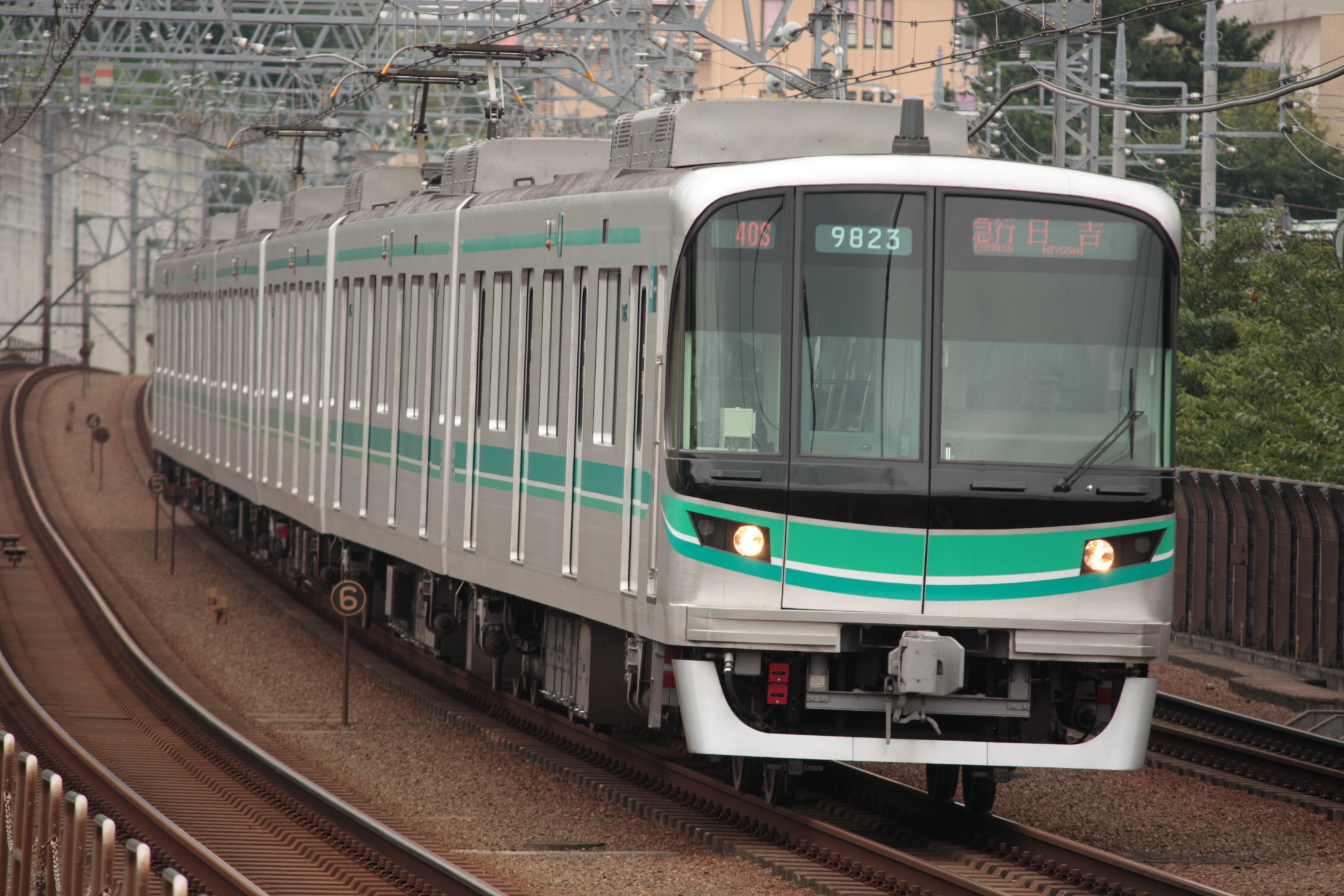
Tokyo Metro 9000 series

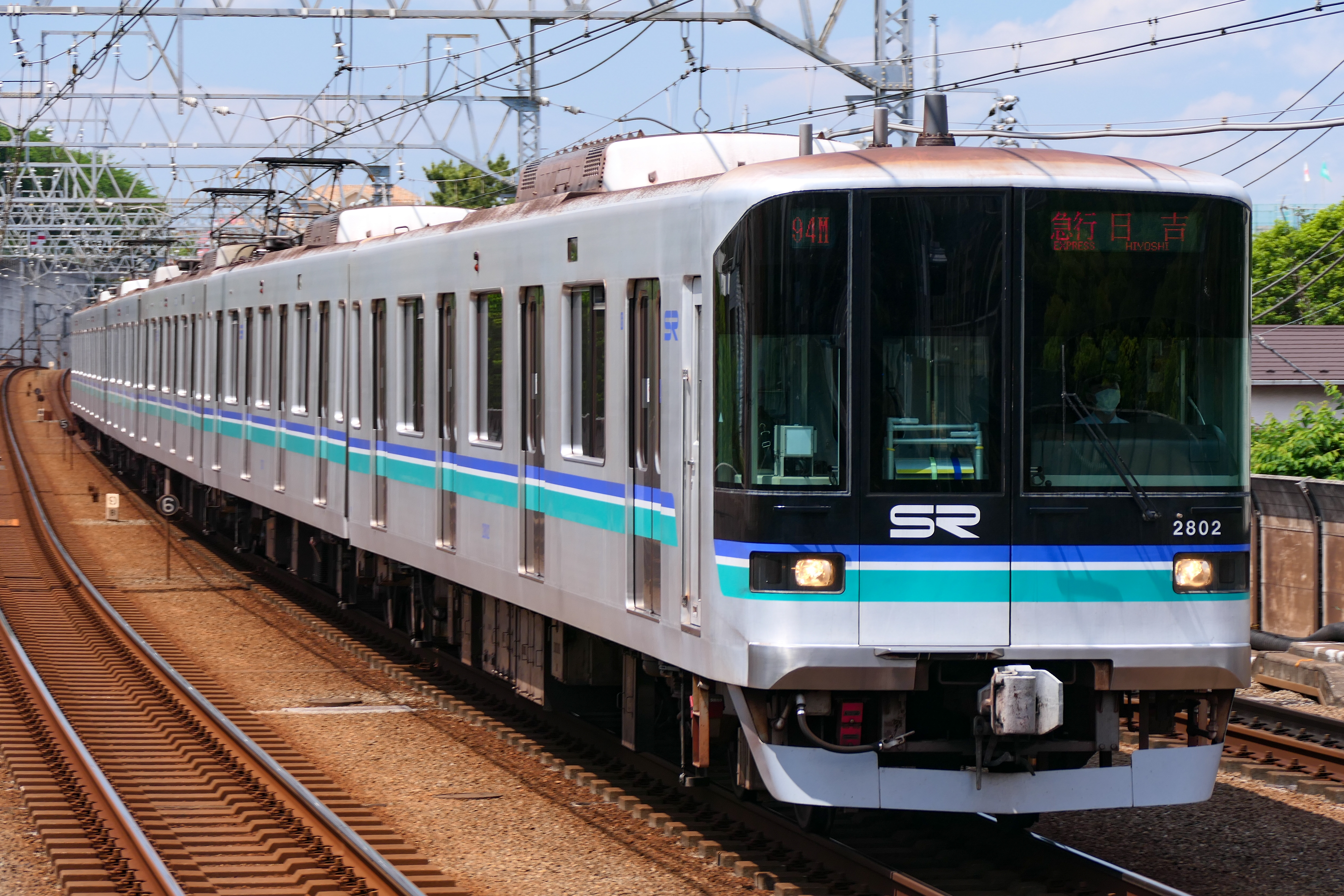
Saitama Rapid Railway 2000 series

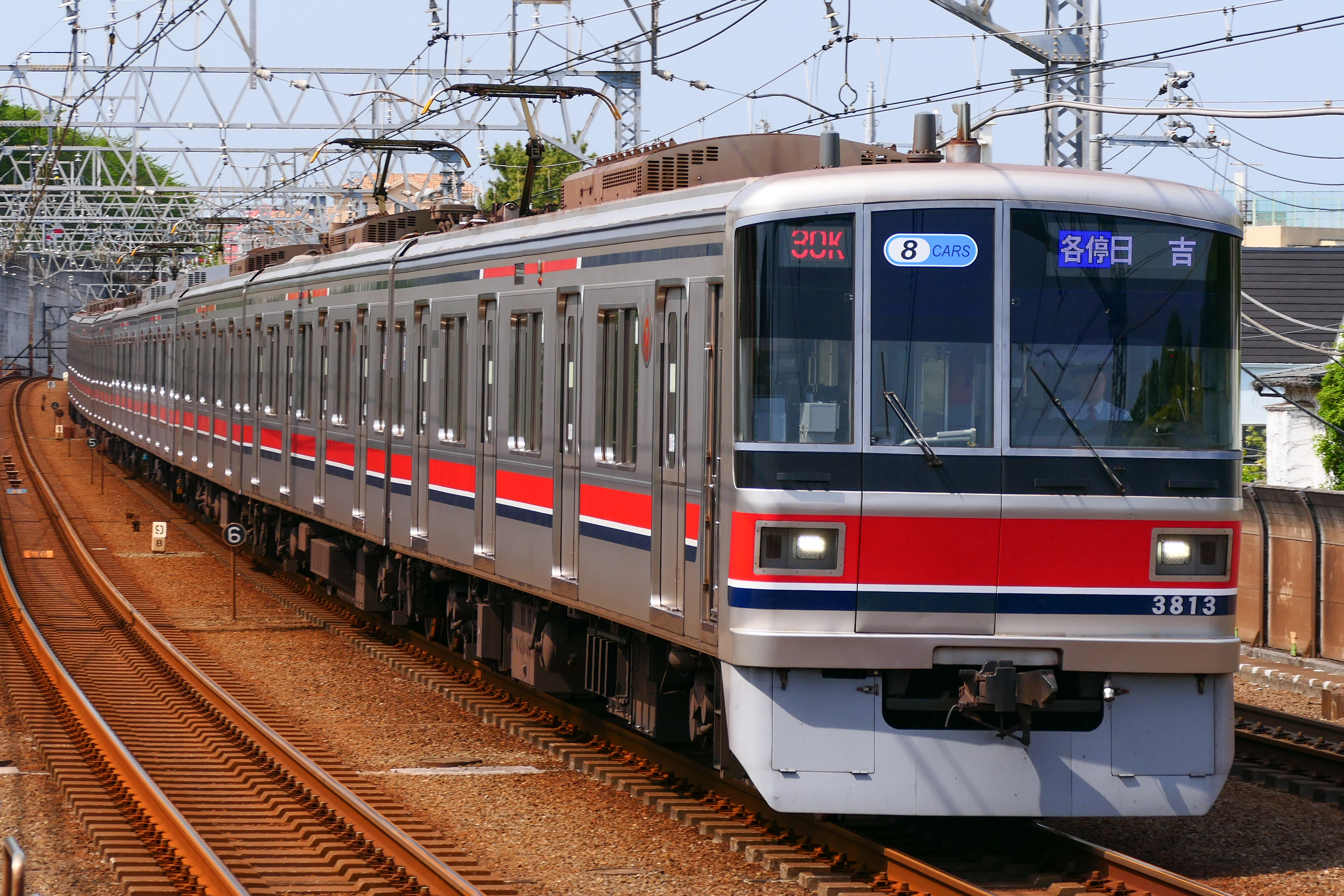
Tokyu 3000 series

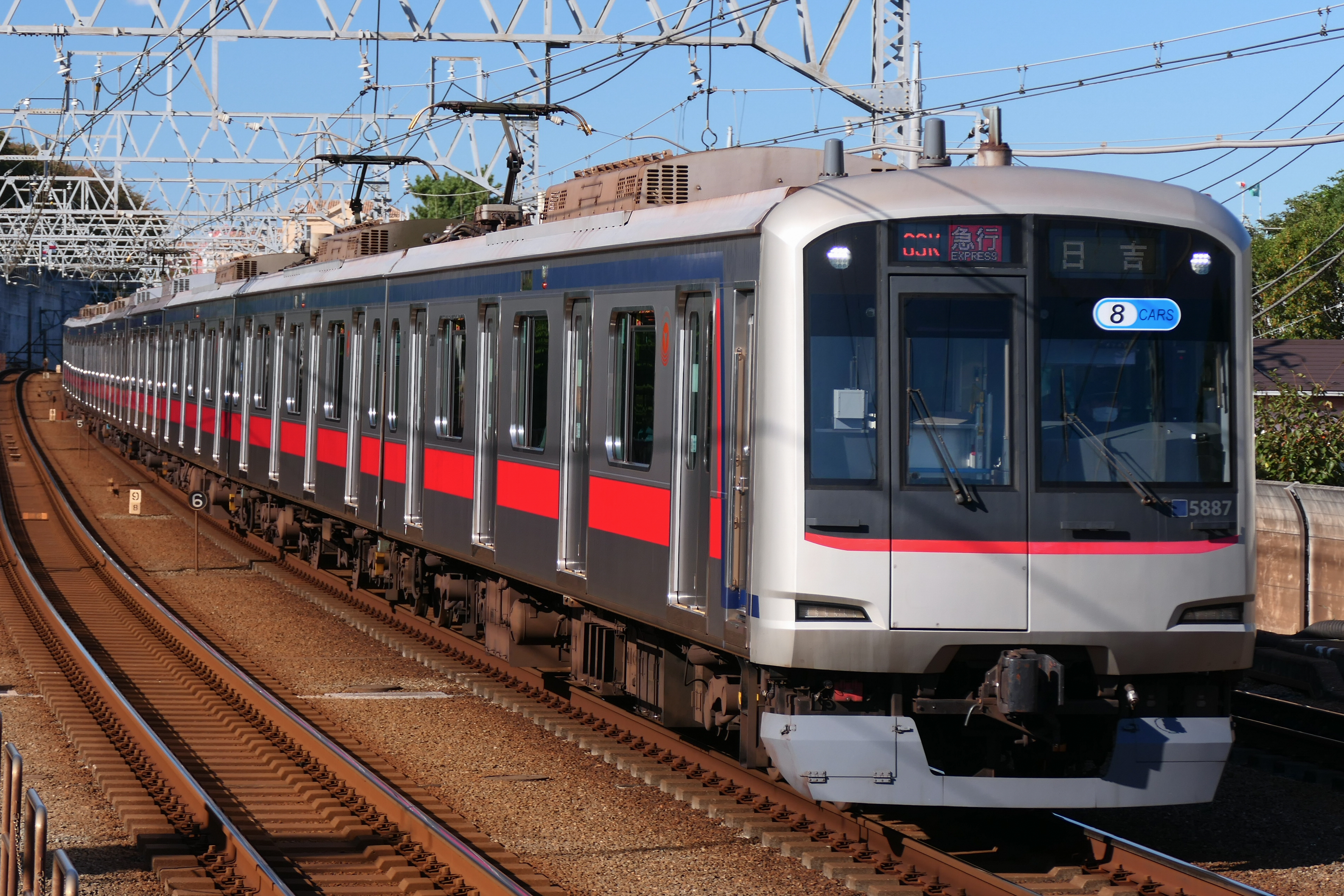
Tokyu 5080 series

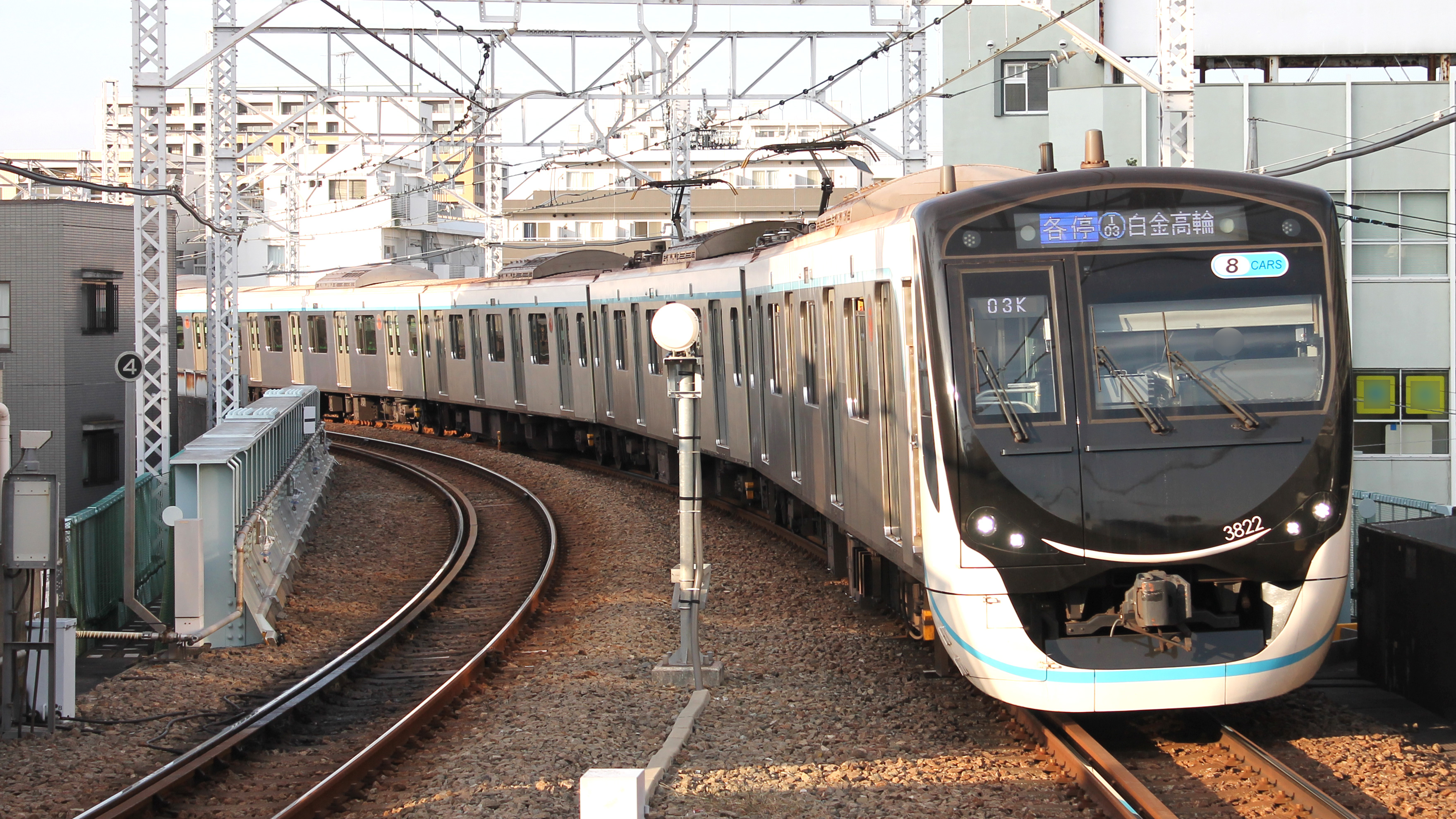
Tokyu 3020 series

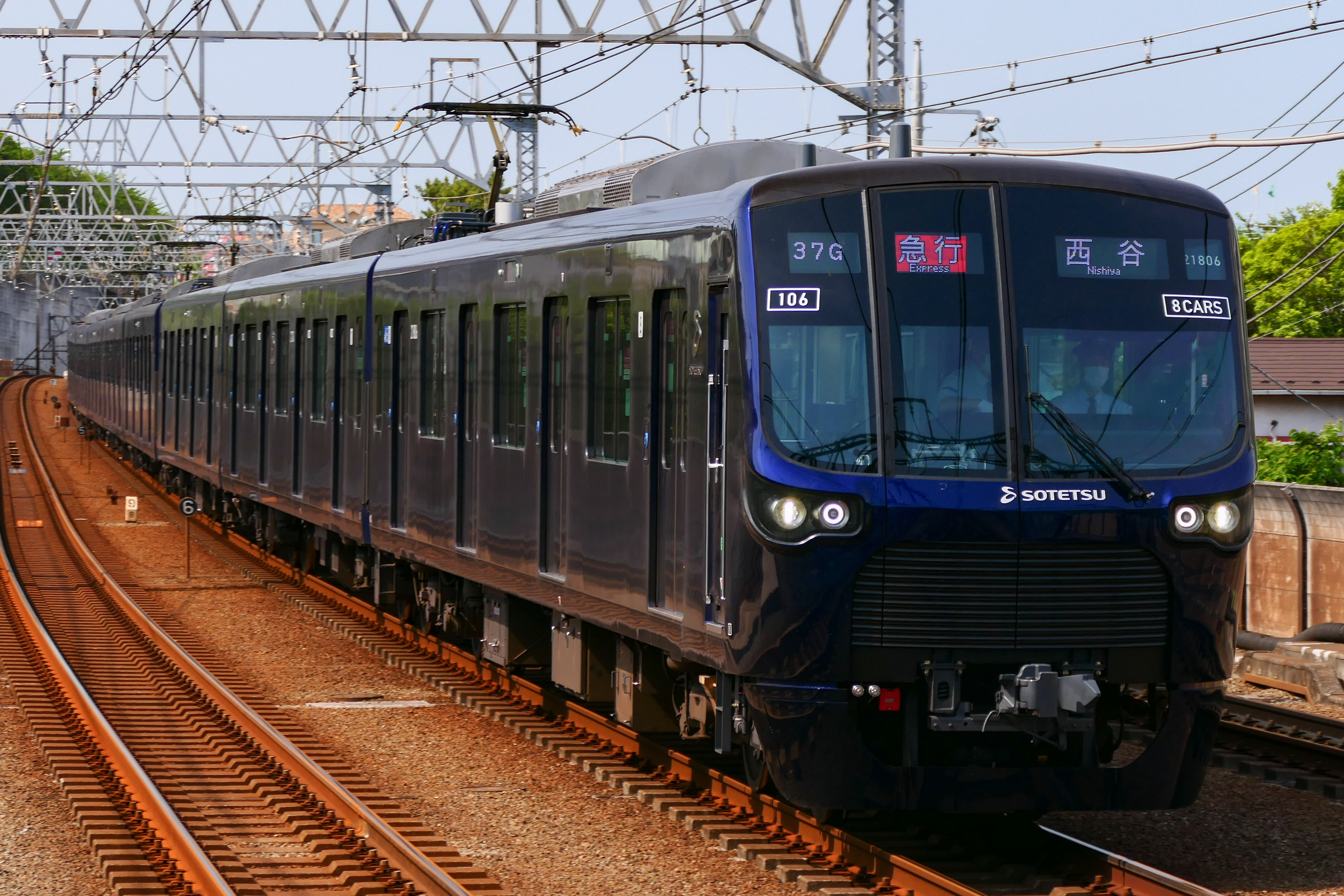
Sotetsu 21000 series

=== Future plans ===
On 28 January 2022, Tokyo Metro announced that a 2.5 km (1.6 mi) spur line from Shirokane-takanawa to Shinagawa would be built. The extension is expected to cost ¥131 billion (2021) (equivalent to ¥142.46 billion or US$941.14 million in 2024) and scheduled to begin revenue service in the mid-2030s. It is intended to increase connections to and from the Chūō Shinkansen, which is scheduled to open for service as early as 2035.
