= Saitama Rapid Railway 2000 series =

Japanese train type

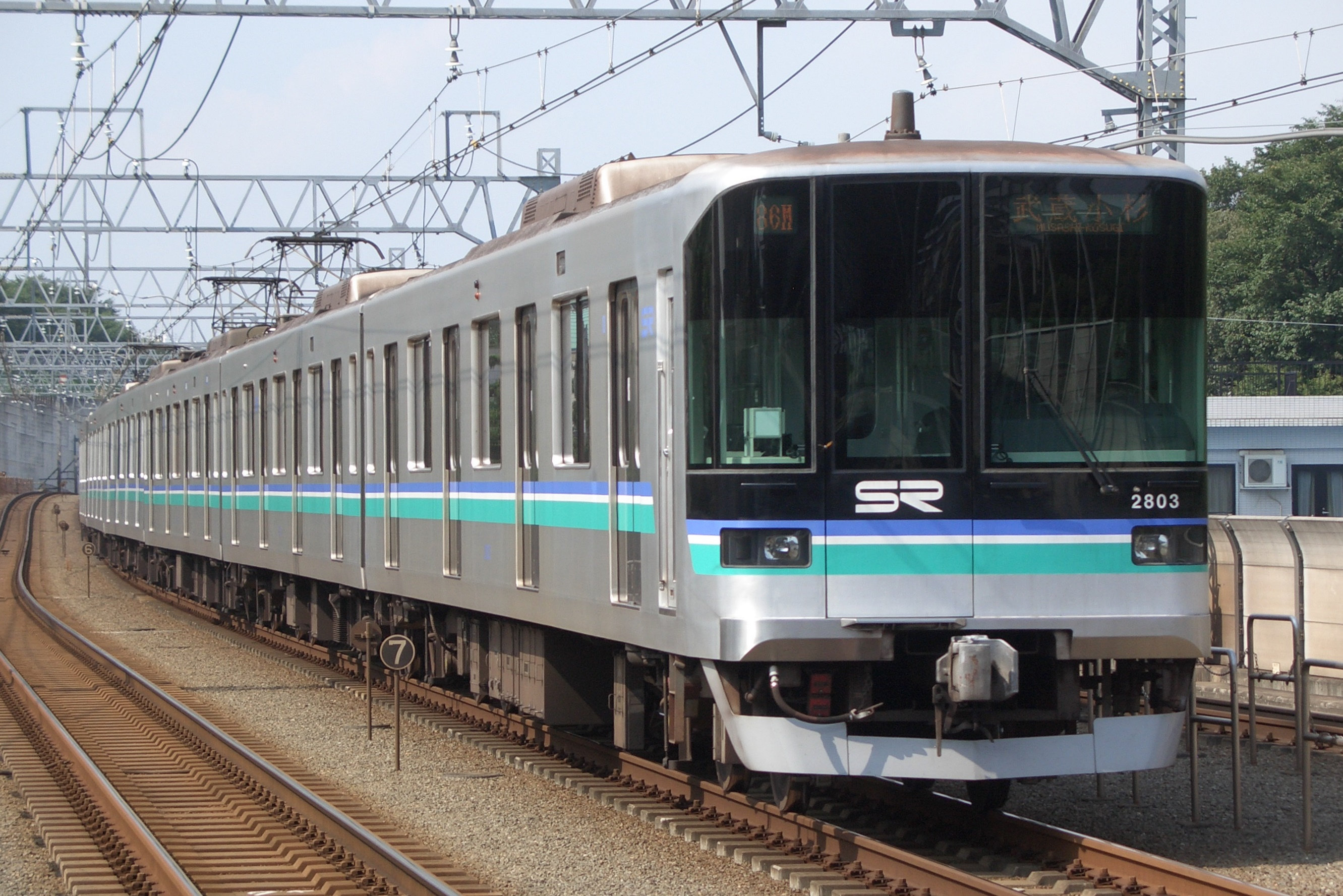
- 2103-2803 on the Tokyu Meguro Line, September 2005
- In service: 2001–present
- Manufacturer: Kawasaki and Kinki Sharyo
- Constructed: 2001-2002
- Entered service: 28 March 2001
- Number built: 60 cars (10 sets)
- Number in service: 60 cars (10 sets)
- Formation: 6 cars per trainset
- Fleet numbers: 2001–2010
- Operators: Saitama Railway Corporation
- Depots: Urawa-Misono
- Lines served: Saitama Rapid Railway Line, Tokyo Metro Namboku Line, Tokyu Meguro Line, Tokyu Shin-Yokohama Line

Specifications
- Car body construction: Aluminium alloy
- Car length: 20.66 m (67 ft 9 in) (end cars); 20 m (65 ft 7 in) (intermediate cars)
- Width: 2.78 m (9 ft 1 in)
- Height: 4.04 m (13 ft 3 in)
- Doors: 4 pairs per side
- Maximum speed: 110 km/h (70 mph)
- Weight: 167.2 t (164.6 long tons; 184.3 short tons)
- Traction system: Mitsubishi Electric MAP-194-15V90 2-level IGBT–VVVF inverter vector control
- Traction motors: 12 × 190 kW (250 hp) 3-phase AC induction motor
- Power output: 2.28 MW (3,060 hp)
- Acceleration: 0.92 m/s^{2} (3.0 ft/s^{2})
- Deceleration: 0.97 m/s^{2} (3.2 ft/s^{2}) (service); 1.3 m/s^{2} (4.3 ft/s^{2}) (emergency)
- Electric system(s): 1,500 V DC overhead catenary
- Current collection: Pantograph
- Track gauge: 1,067 mm (3 ft 6 in)

The Saitama Railway 2000 series (埼玉高速鉄道2000系) is an electric multiple unit (EMU) train type operated on the Saitama Rapid Railway Line in Saitama Prefecture, Japan, by the third-sector railway operating company Saitama Railway Corporation since March 2001.

== Operations ==
The trains are used on Saitama Rapid Railway Line services, with through-running to and from the Tokyo Metro Namboku Line, Tokyu Meguro Line, and the Tokyu Shin-Yokohama Line.

== Formations ==
As of 1 April 2014, the fleet consists of 10 six-car sets, each formed of three motored ("M") cars and three non-powered trailer ("T") cars, as shown below, with car 1 at the northern (Urawa-Misono) end.

Car No.	1	2	3	4	5	6
Designation	CT1	M1-1	Tc2	M1-3	M1-4	CT2
Numbering	2100	2200	2500	2600	2700	2800

- Car 2 has a lozenge-type pantograph, and car 4 has two.
- Cars 2 and 5 each have a wheelchair space.
- Car 4 is designated as a mildy air-conditioned car.

== Interior ==
Passenger accommodation consists of longitudinal bench seating with priority seats in each car.

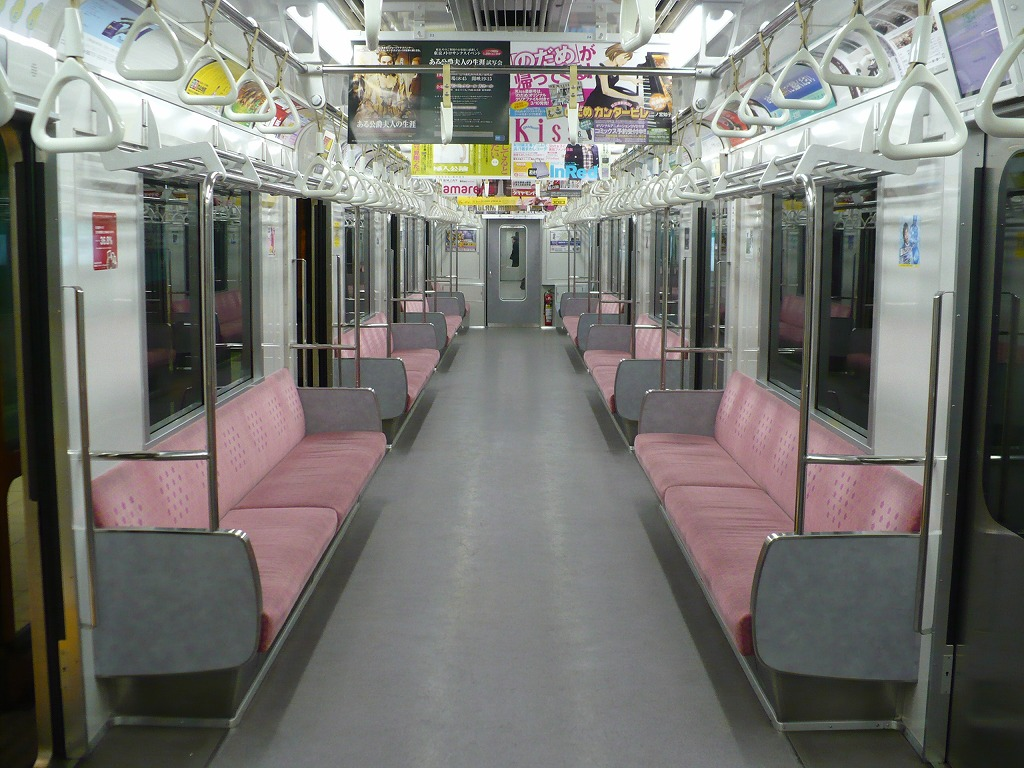
Interior view

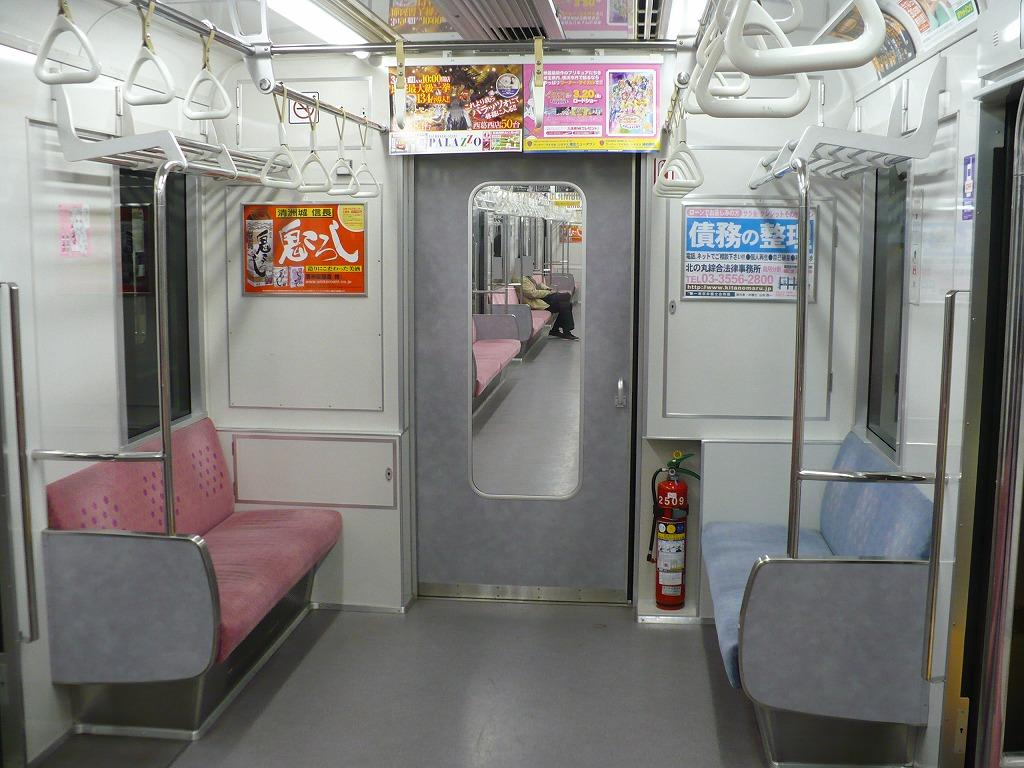
Priority seating (right) at end of car

== History ==
The 2000 series trains entered service on 28 March 2001, coinciding with the opening of the Saitama Rapid Railway Line.

In February 2026, Saitama Railway Corporation announced that it would refurbish the 2000 series fleet beginning in fiscal 2027. Refurbished sets are scheduled to return to revenue service from fiscal 2028.
