= Tokyu 3000 series =

Japanese train type

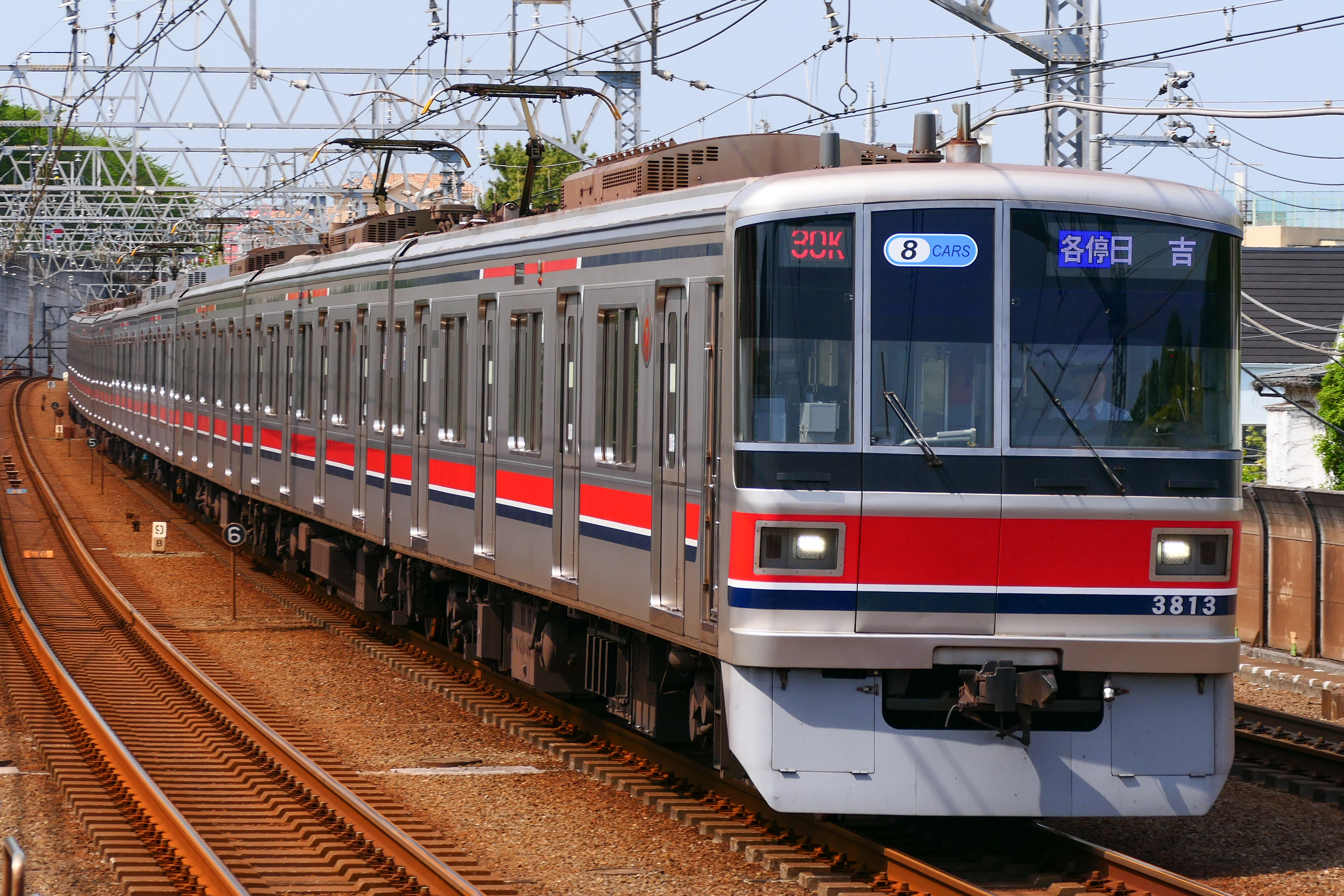
- 3000 series set on the Tokyu Meguro Line approaching Tamagawa in April 2023
- Manufacturers: Tokyu Car Corporation; J-TREC (set lengthening cars)
- Constructed: 1999–2001; 2022–2023 (set lengthening cars)
- Entered service: 16 April 1999
- Refurbished: 2025–
- Number built: 104 vehicles (13 sets)
- Number in service: 104 vehicles (13 sets)
- Formation: 8 (formerly 6) cars per set
- Fleet numbers: 3001–3013
- Operator: Tōkyū Railways
- Depot: Motosumiyoshi
- Lines served: Tokyu Meguro Line; Tokyu Shin-Yokohama Line; Tokyo Metro Namboku Line; Toei Mita Line; Saitama Rapid Railway Line; Sōtetsu Shin-Yokohama Line; Sōtetsu Main Line; Sōtetsu Izumino Line; Former operations: Tokyu Toyoko Line

Specifications
- Car body construction: Stainless steel
- Car length: 20,300 mm (66 ft 7 in) (end cars); 20,000 mm (65 ft 7 in) (intermediate cars)
- Width: 2,820 mm (9 ft 3 in)
- Height: 4,065 mm (13 ft 4.0 in)
- Doors: 4 pairs per side
- Maximum speed: 110 km/h (68 mph) (service); 120 km/h (75 mph) (design)
- Traction system: Variable frequency (IGBT)
- Acceleration: 3.3 km/(h⋅s) (2.1 mph/s)
- Deceleration: 3.5 km/(h⋅s) (2.2 mph/s) (service); 4.5 km/(h⋅s) (2.8 mph/s) (emergency)
- Electric systems: 1,500 V DC (overhead wire)
- Current collection: Pantograph
- Bogies: TS-1019 (motored); TS-1020 (trailer)
- Safety systems: ATC-P, Tokyu ATS, ATO
- Track gauge: 1,067 mm (3 ft 6 in)

The Tokyu 3000 series (東急3000系, Tōkyū 3000-kei) is a Japanese commuter electric multiple unit (EMU) train type operated by Tokyu Corporation in the Tokyo area of Japan. Introduced into service on 16 April 1999 on the Tokyu Toyoko Line as a sole eight-car set, a total of 78 vehicles, which would form 13 six-car sets, were built by Tokyu Car Corporation between 1999 and 2001 for use on Tokyu Meguro Line inter-running services to the Tokyo Metro Namboku Line, Toei Mita Line, and Saitama Rapid Railway Line.

Between 2022 and 2023, 26 cars were built to augment the fleet into eight-car formations ahead of the introduction of Sotetsu line through services via the Tokyu Shin-Yokohama Line.

== Operations ==
The 3000 series sets are used on Tokyu Meguro Line and Tokyo Metro Namboku Line, Toei Mita Line, and Saitama Rapid Railway Line inter-running services. In March 2023, they began running on the Tokyu Shin-Yokohama Line, the Sotetsu Shin-Yokohama Line, the Sotetsu Main Line, and the Sotetsu Izumino Line.

== Formations ==
As of 1 April 2016, the fleet consists of 13 six-car sets based at Motosumiyoshi Depot, formed as follows with three motored (M) cars and three unpowered trailer (T) cars. Car 1 is at the Meguro (northern) end, and car 6 is at the Hiyoshi (southern) end.

Car No.	1	2	3	4	5	6
Designation	Tc2	M2	M1	T	M	Tc1
Numbering	30xx	325x	32xx	35xx	34xx	31xx

- The "M" and "M1" cars are each fitted with two single arm pantographs.
- Car 4 is designated as being mildly air-conditioned.

=== Original 8-car formation ===
The first set, 3001, initially ran as an eight-car formation on the Tokyu Toyoko Line, as shown below, with the Tc2 car at the Shibuya (northern) end.

Designation	Tc2	M2	M1	T	T'	M2	M1	Tc1
Numbering	3001	3251	3201	3501	3502	3252	3502	3101
Capacity (seated/total)	48/141	51/151	54/151	54/151	54/151	51/151	54/151	48/141

The two M1 cars each had two single-arm pantographs.

== Interior ==
Seating is longitudinal bench seating throughout. Wheelchair spaces are provided in cars 2 and 5.

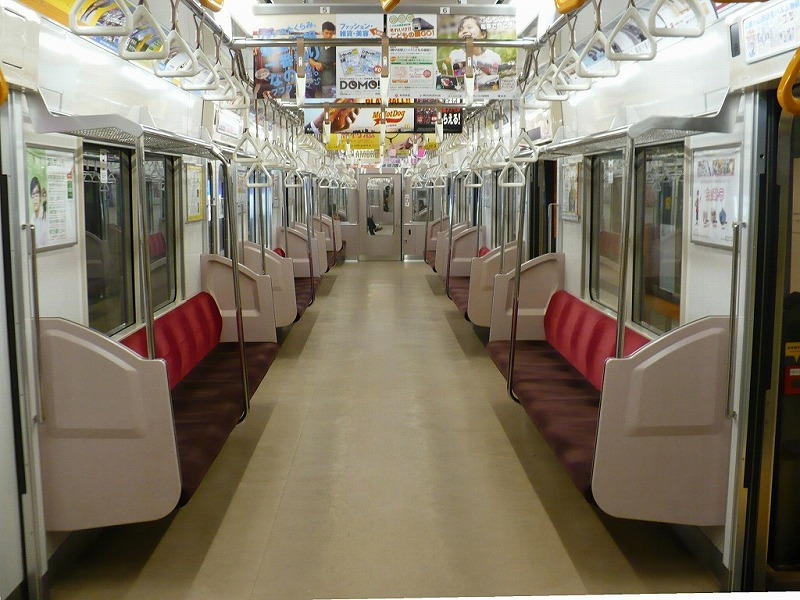
Interior view

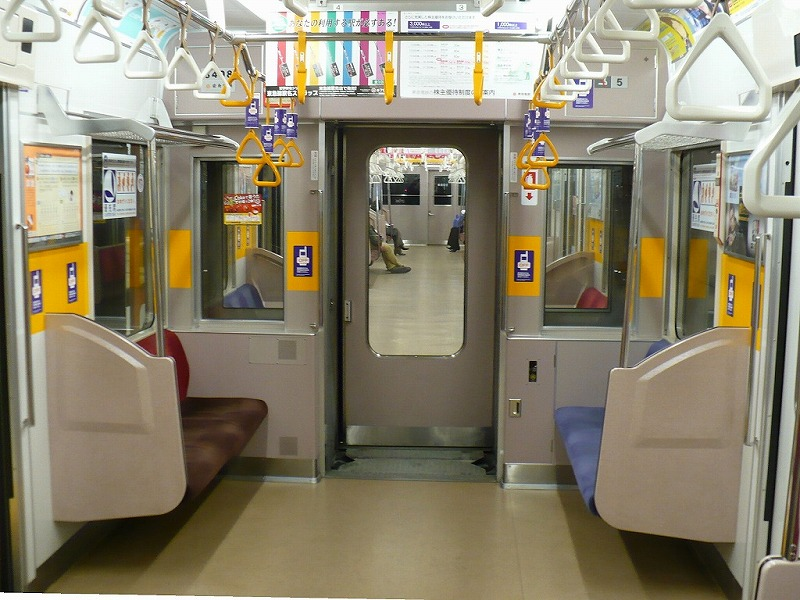
Priority seating

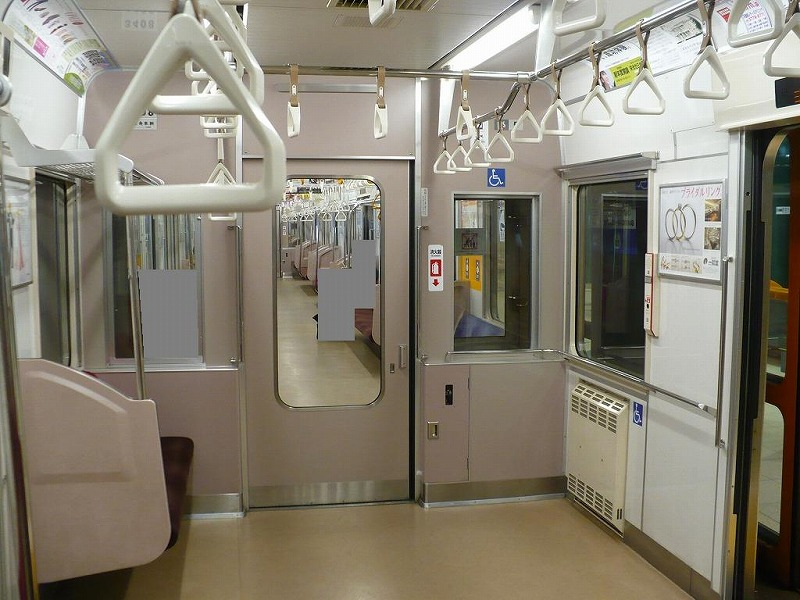
Wheelchair space

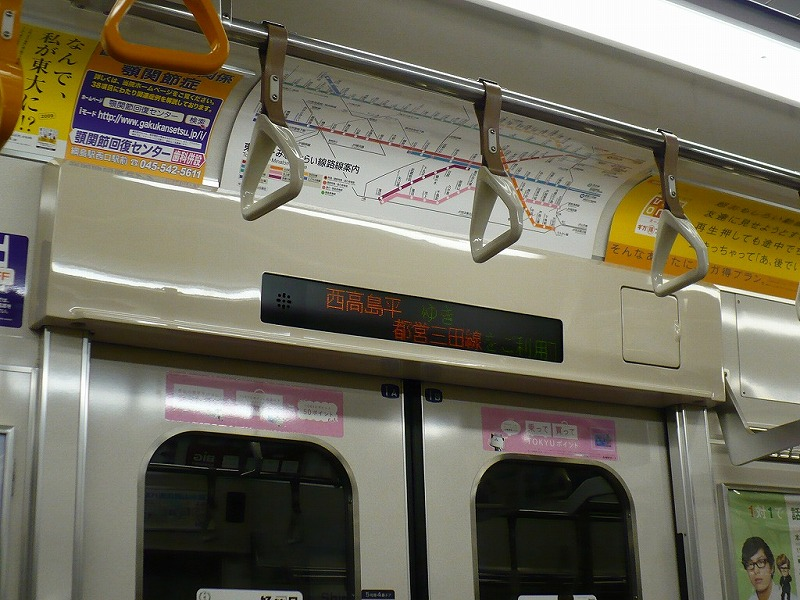
LED passenger information display

LCD passenger information displays installed from 2020

=== Driver's cab ===
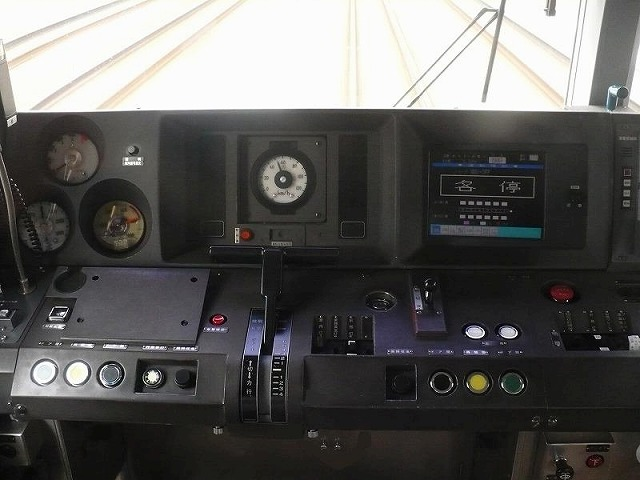
Driver's cab, March 2009

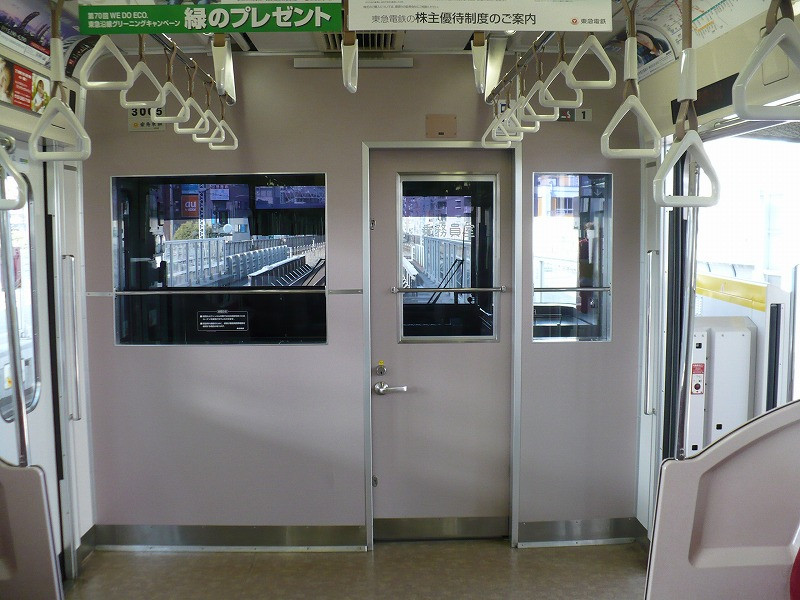
Partition behind the driver's cab

== History ==
The first 3000 series set, 3001, entered service in 1999, initially as an eight-car formation used on the Tokyu Toyoko Line. This was subsequently reformed as a six-car set following delivery of the rest of the fleet destined for the Meguro Line. A total of 13 six-car sets (78 vehicles) were built by 2001.

Between 2020 and 2021, the 3000 series fleet was modified to support operation on the Sagami Railway (Sotetsu) network, including upgrades to communications and safety systems. Internally, the trains' original LED information screens were replaced with pairs of LCD passenger information screens.

On 26 March 2019, Tokyu Corporation announced that the entire Meguro Line fleet, including the 3000 series fleet, would be lengthened from six cars to eight cars from the first half of fiscal 2022. Six of the additional cars were completed in late March 2022 and transported to Nagatsuta depot. As of February 2023, all sets have been lengthened to eight cars. The new cars are based on the design of the 5000 series, thus featuring several differences from the original 3000 series cars.

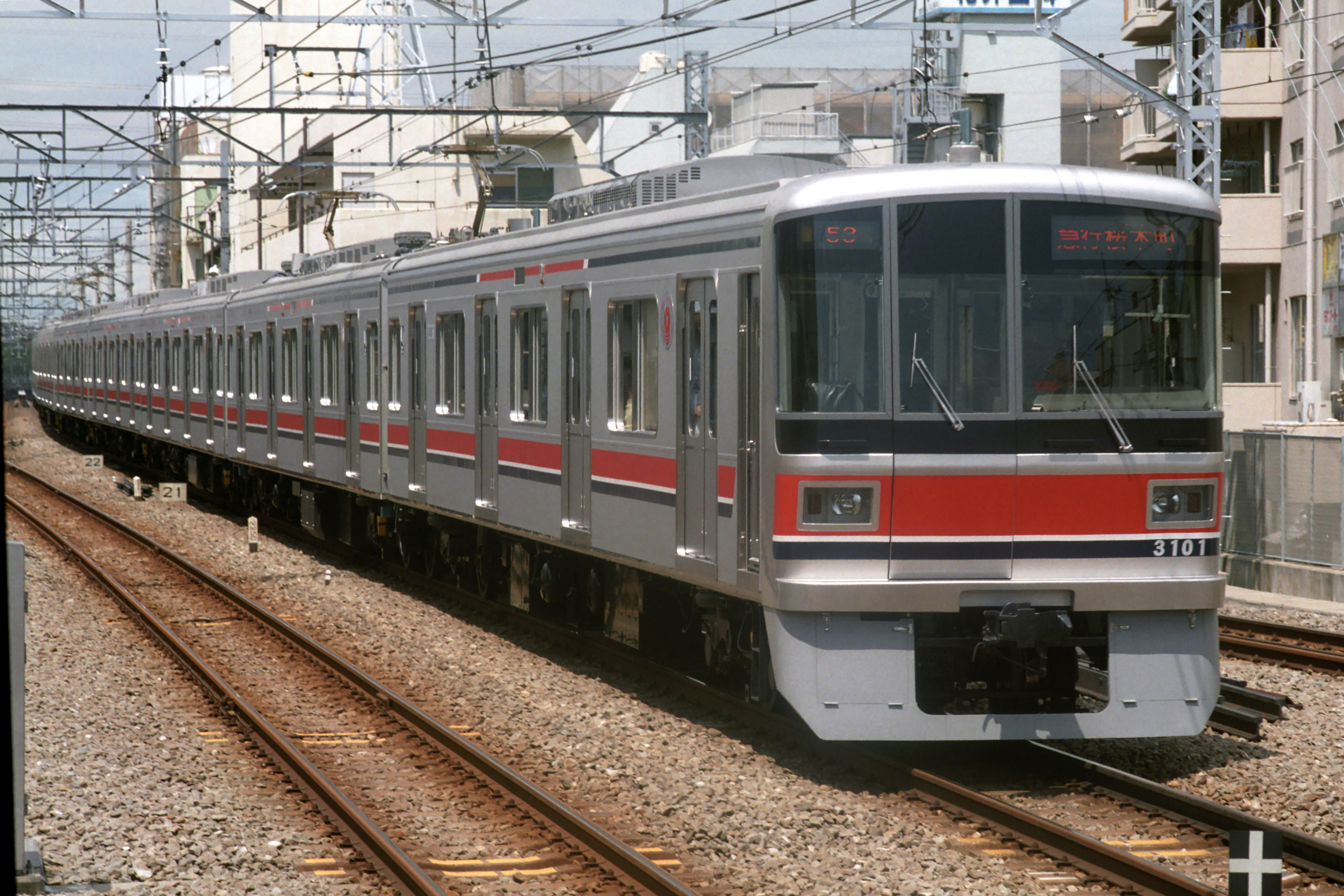
Original 8-car set 3001 on the Tokyu Toyoko Line in April 1999

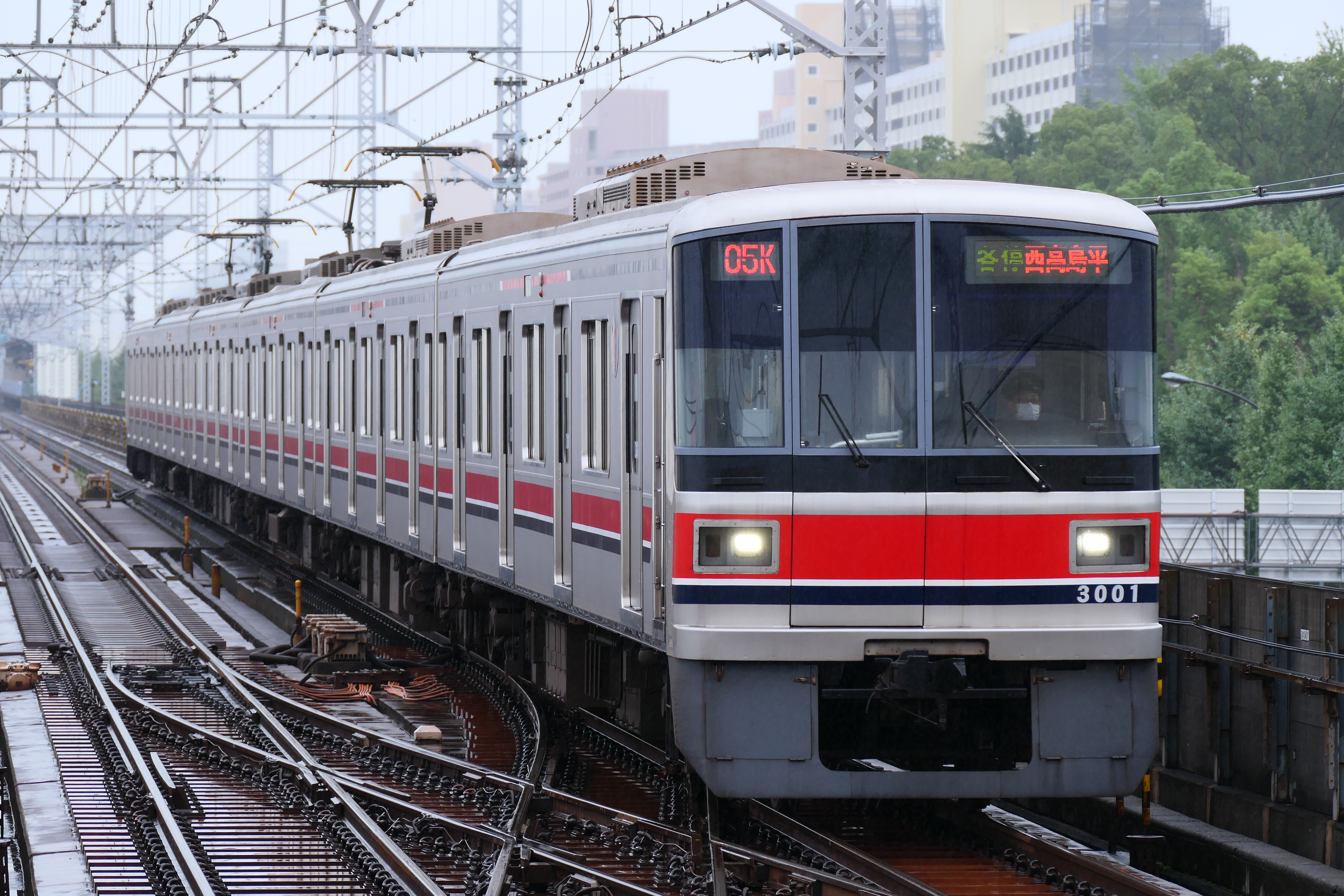
6-car set 3001 on the Toei Mita Line in September 2020

=== Refurbishment ===
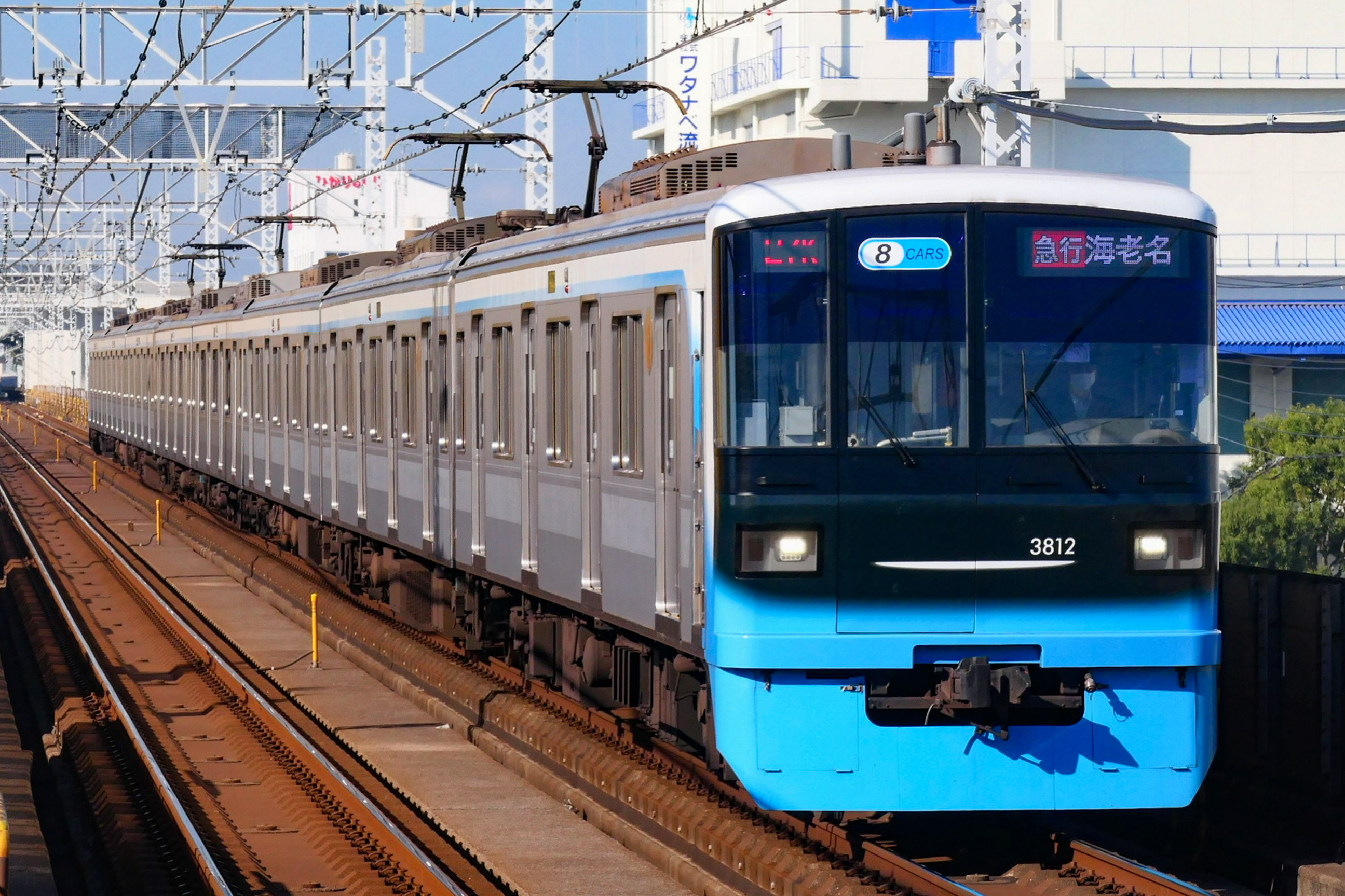
Refurbished 3000 series set in November 2025

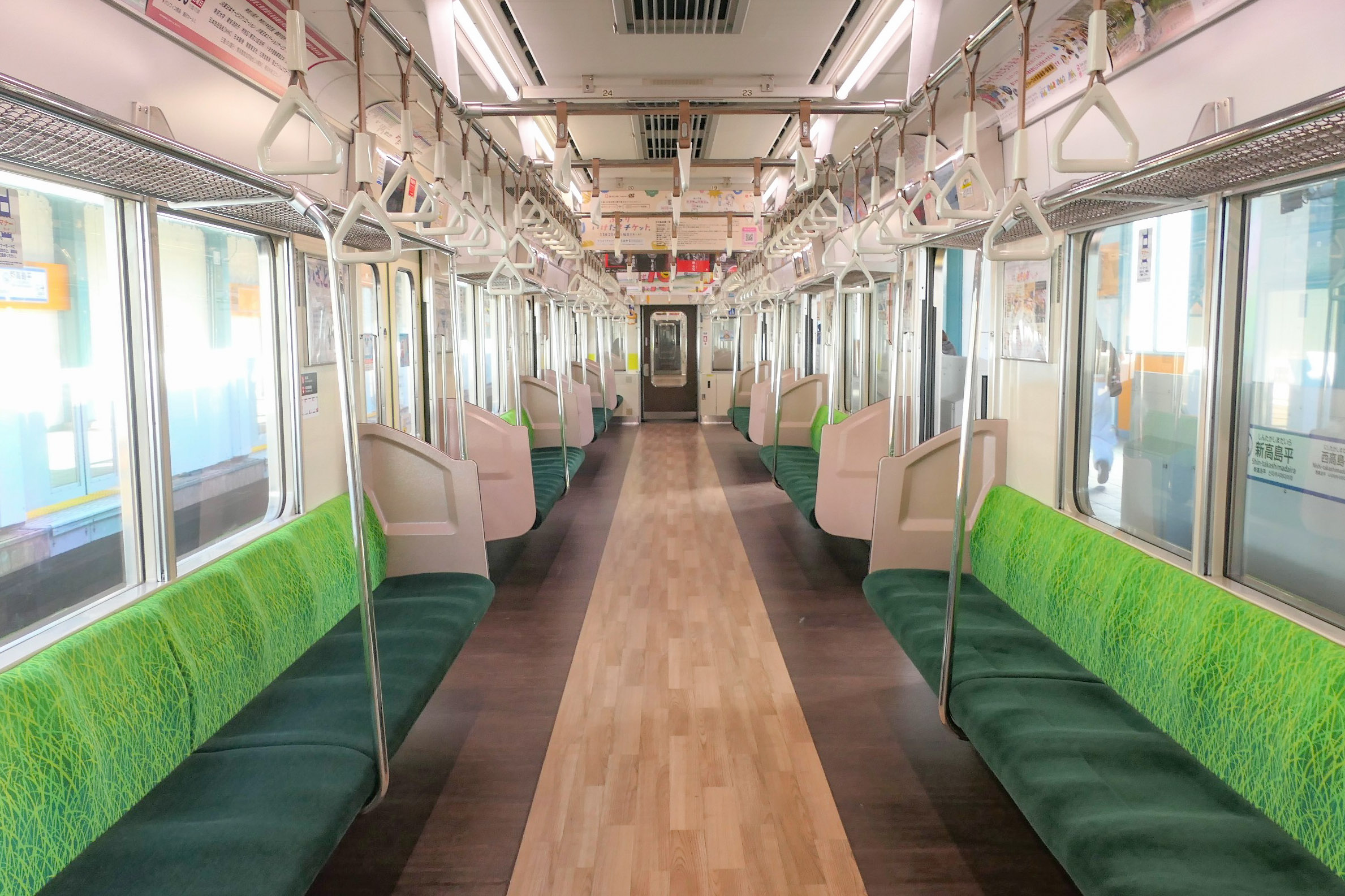
Refurbished interior

On 8 May 2025, Tokyu Corporation announced its plans to refurbish its 3000 series fleet, as well as 23 Toyoko Line 5050 series 8-car sets and 18 Den-en-toshi Line 5000 series sets. Refurbished sets will carry a new livery and a redesigned interior based on that of the 2020 series, with new walls, seats, and flooring as well as additional wheelchair spaces. The first refurbished 3000 series set was scheduled to return to service on 2 October 2025.
