= Komagome Station =

Railway and metro station in Tokyo, Japan

Coordinates: 35.736289°N 139.746995°E

JY10 Komagome Station 駒込駅

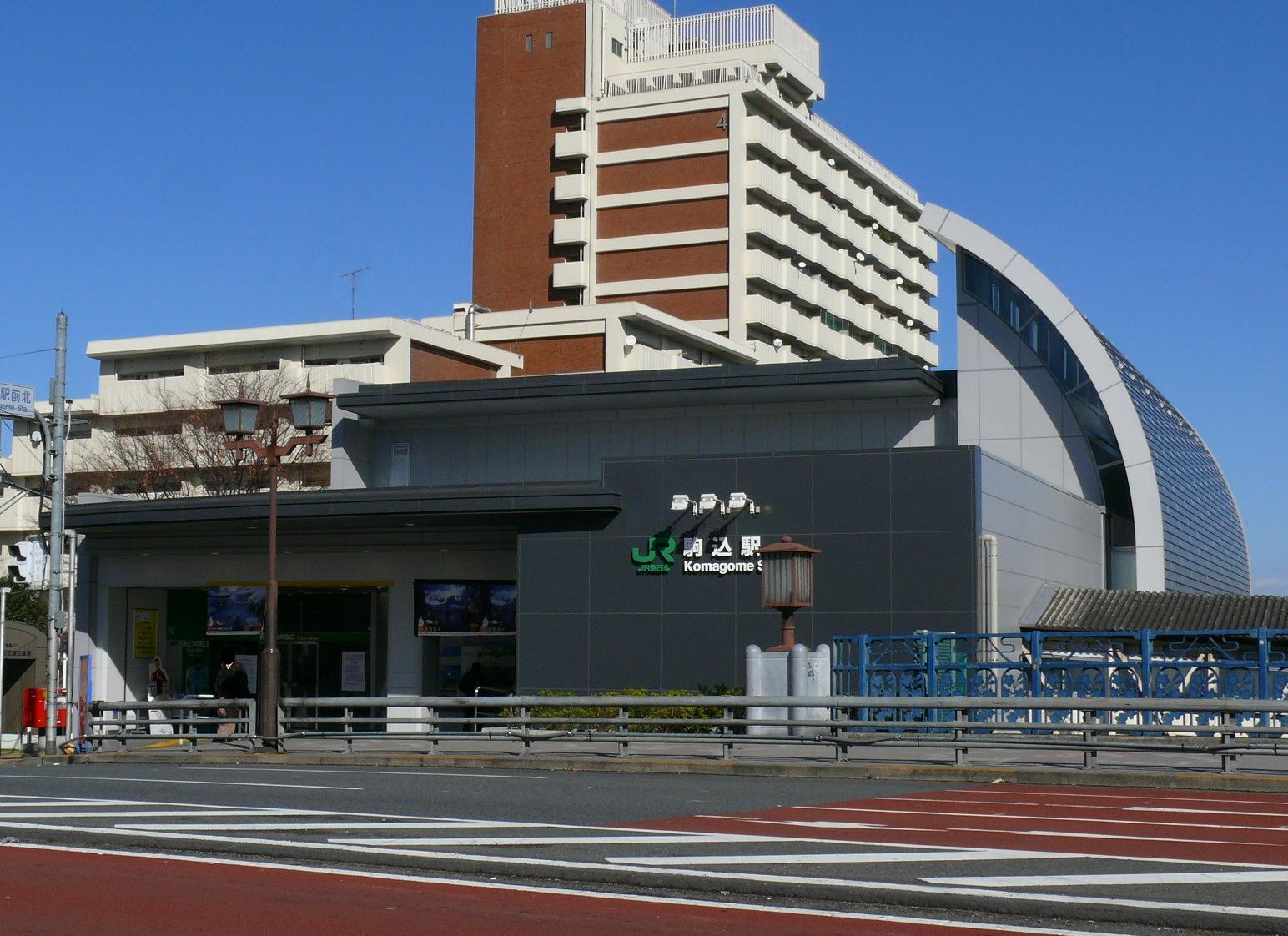
- North building of JR station

General information
- Location: 2 Komagome, Toshima-ku, Tokyo; Japan
- Operator: JR East; Tokyo Metro
- Lines: Yamanote Line (JY-10); Namboku Line (N-14)
- Platforms: 1 island platform (JR East); 1 island platform (Tokyo Metro)
- Connections: Bus terminal

Other information
- Station code: N-14

History
- Opened: 15 November 1910; 115 years ago

Passengers
- FY2024: 87,080 daily; 37,671 daily

Services
Preceding station	JR East	Following station
Sugamo JY11 Next counter-clockwise	Yamanote Line	Tabata JY09 Next clockwise
Preceding station	Tokyo Metro	Following station
Hon-komagome towards Meguro	Namboku Line	Nishigahara towards Akabane-iwabuchi
Location
- Location within Tokyo Yamanote Loop Location within Tokyo wards area Location within Japan

Komagome Station (駒込駅, Komagome-eki) is a railway station in Toshima, Tokyo, Japan, operated by the East Japan Railway Company (JR East) and the Tokyo subway operator Tokyo Metro.

== Lines ==
Komagome Station is served by the circular Yamanote Line and by the Tokyo Metro Namboku Line subway line.

== Station layout ==
=== JR East platforms ===
The JR East section of the station is composed of one island platform serving two tracks.

Chest-height platform edge doors were installed on the Yamanote Line platforms during fiscal 2013.

1	Yamanote Line	for Tabata, Ueno, and Tokyo
2	Yamanote Line	for Ikebukuro, Shinjuku, and Shibuya

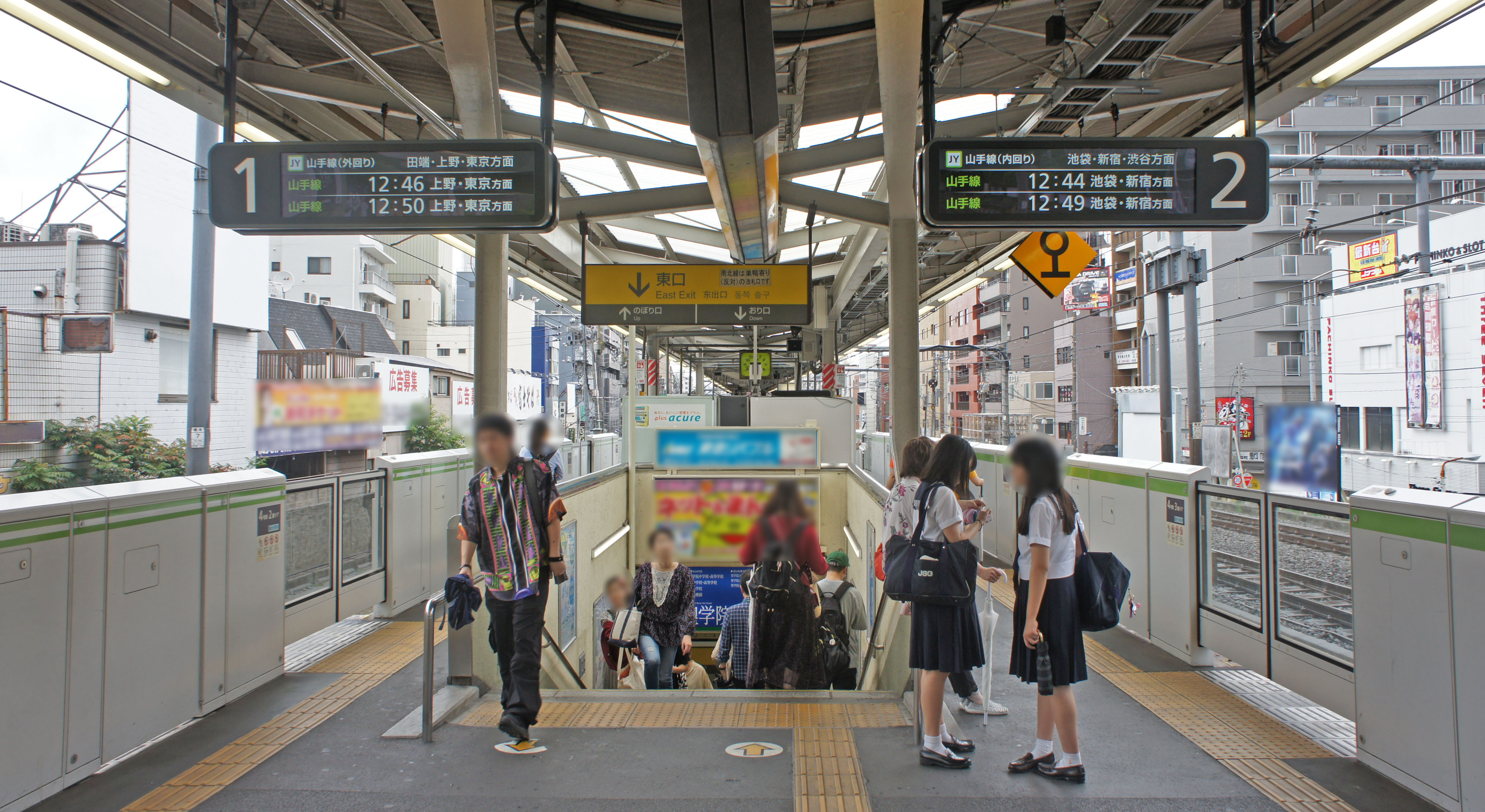
JR East platforms in 2019

=== Tokyo Metro platforms ===
The Tokyo Metro section of the station is composed of one island platform serving two tracks.

1
Namboku Line
for Akabane-iwabuchi
Saitama Rapid Railway Line for Urawa-misono
2
- for Shirokane-takanawa and Meguro
- Meguro Line for Hiyoshi
- Tokyu Shin-Yokohama Line for Shin-Yokohama Station
- Sotetsu Main Line for Ebina via the Tokyu/Sotetsu Shin-Yokohama Line

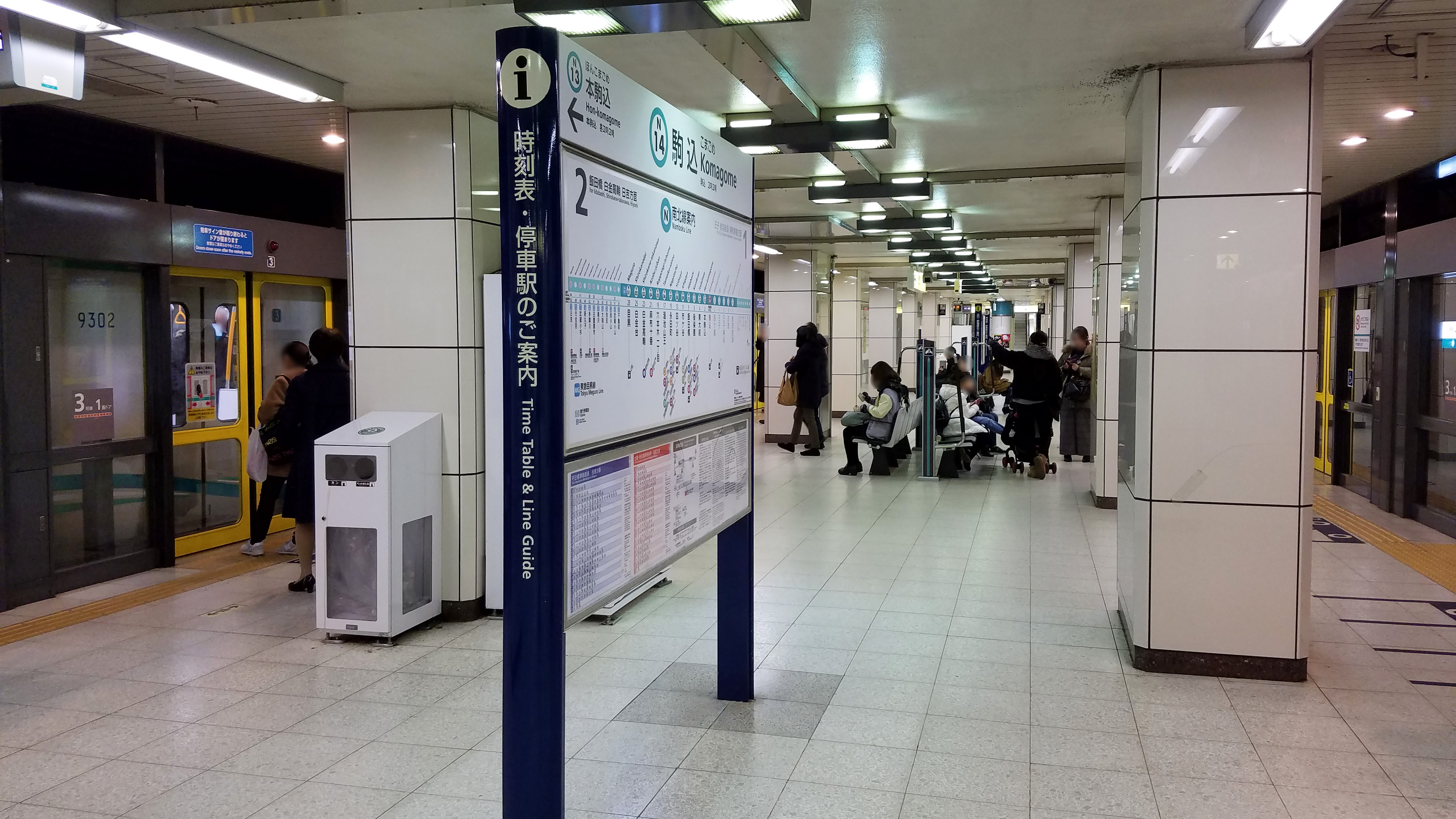
Tokyo Metro platforms in 2017

== History ==
- 15 November 1910: This station was opened by Japanese Government Railways as a station of the Yamanote Line.
- 13 April 1945: The station building was burned down by an air raid during World War II.
- 1 April 1987: The station facilities of the Yamanote Line were inherited by JR East after the privatization of the Japanese National Railways.
- 29 November 1991: The Namboku Line station was opened by Teito Rapid Transit Authority (TRTA).
- 1 April 2004: The station facilities of the Namboku Line were inherited by Tokyo Metro after the privatization of the TRTA.
- 2016: Station numbering was introduced to the Yamanote Line with Komagome being assigned station number JY10.

== Surrounding area ==
Rikugien Garden can be accessed by walking from this station.

Kyu-Furukawa Gardens can also be accessed by walking from this station.

== See also ==
- List of railway stations in Japan
