= History of Tokyo =

The 23 special wards of Tokyo

The wards inside Tokyo prefecture

Tokyo is Japan's capital city and prefecture. Defined by city proper area, it was the world's 12th largest city in 2018, with 13,515,271 residents. The history of Tokyo starts with archaeological remains in the area from around 5,000 years ago.

Tokyo's oldest temple is possibly Sensō-ji in Asakusa, founded in 628. The city's original name, Edo, first appears in the 12th century. From 1457 to 1640, Edo Castle was constructed, and it became the city's center. Tokugawa Ieyasu, after conquering Edo's island of Honshu in 1600, chose Edo to replace Kyoto as Japan's capital. Japan's monarchy at Kyoto became a symbolic entity, as actual power was given to Edo's Tokugawa shogunate. By the 1650s, Edo became Japan's largest city, and by 1720, it was the world's largest. The Great Fire of Meireki in 1657 killed around 108,000 people. After Japan opened itself to most foreigners in 1854, there was conflict over Japan's governance which led to the Boshin War and Meiji Restoration. The shogunate was dissolved, and the monarchy's powers were restored at Edo, renamed Tokyo.

The city was destroyed by the 1923 Great Kantō earthquake, and Allied bombings during World War II. Over 100,000 people died from the United States' 1945 bombings known as Operation Meetinghouse. After Japan surrendered to the Allies later that year, the U.S. occupied the country until 1952. The post-war Japanese economic miracle and the 1964 Summer Olympics allowed Tokyo to rebuild and grow. Its residents' transportation needs were met by the interlocking of the Tokyo Metro, Toei Subway, and Shinkansen. In the 1990s, Japan entered a period of economic stagnation called the Lost Decades, worsened by the COVID-19 pandemic which scaled back the 2020 Summer Olympics. (Note: The Olympics were originally planned for 2020, but the pandemic delayed them to 2021; despite this, its name remained the "2020 Summer Olympics".)

== Pre-Tokugawa period ==
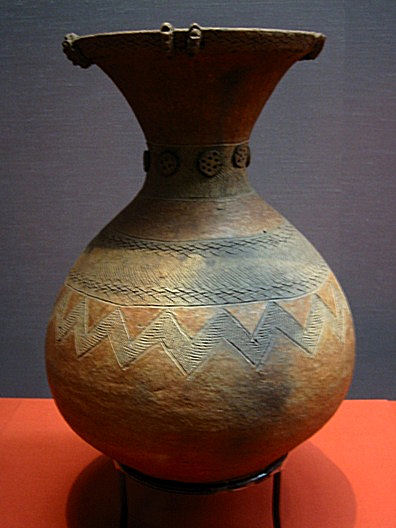
A jar from the Yayoi period (300 BC to 300 AD) found in Kugahara, Ōta

The site of Tokyo has been inhabited since ancient times. The original inhabitants might have been the indigenous Ainu people, who theoretically conquered all of modern Japan before the Japanese subsumed them. The theory they were in Kanto is based on Ainu place names found in and near Tokyo. At the Ōmori Shell Midden site in modern-day Ōmori, a collection of pottery, worked bones, and a clay tablet were dated to be 5,000 years old, in the Bronze Age. At Yayoi-zaka near modern Nezu Station, Yayoi period grains of charred rice and chaff were found, making it the oldest agricultural site in Tokyo. The 4th century Horaisan Kofun in Tanagawa is Tokyo's oldest tomb. The 5th century Noge Otsuka in Todoroki is a 5th century tomb from the Middle Kofun culture. Around the tomb's hill, various objects from that time imply the location was the resting place of a powerful chieftain of the southern Musashino area. Early pots were used to store nuts, scavenged from early inhabitants' hunter-gatherer lifestyles. Hunting and gathering decreased over time as the Tokyo peoples started growing food in areas closer to home.

Kanto was a well-irrigated piece of flatland ideal for the cultivation of rice, and protected from coastal invaders from mainland Asia. The three villages that formed the small fishing village of Edo, Tokyo's earliest form, started around the Sumida, Arakawa, and Edogawa rivers. These areas are highly-prone to natural disasters, which would be a common sight in the area's history. Early Korean communities were present at the Sumida area. The Tama River was an important location for farming, and there is evidence there of large-scale irrigation works which created a food abundance. There are sixty early grave mounds around the middle and lower Tama reaches, including Horaisun Kofun.

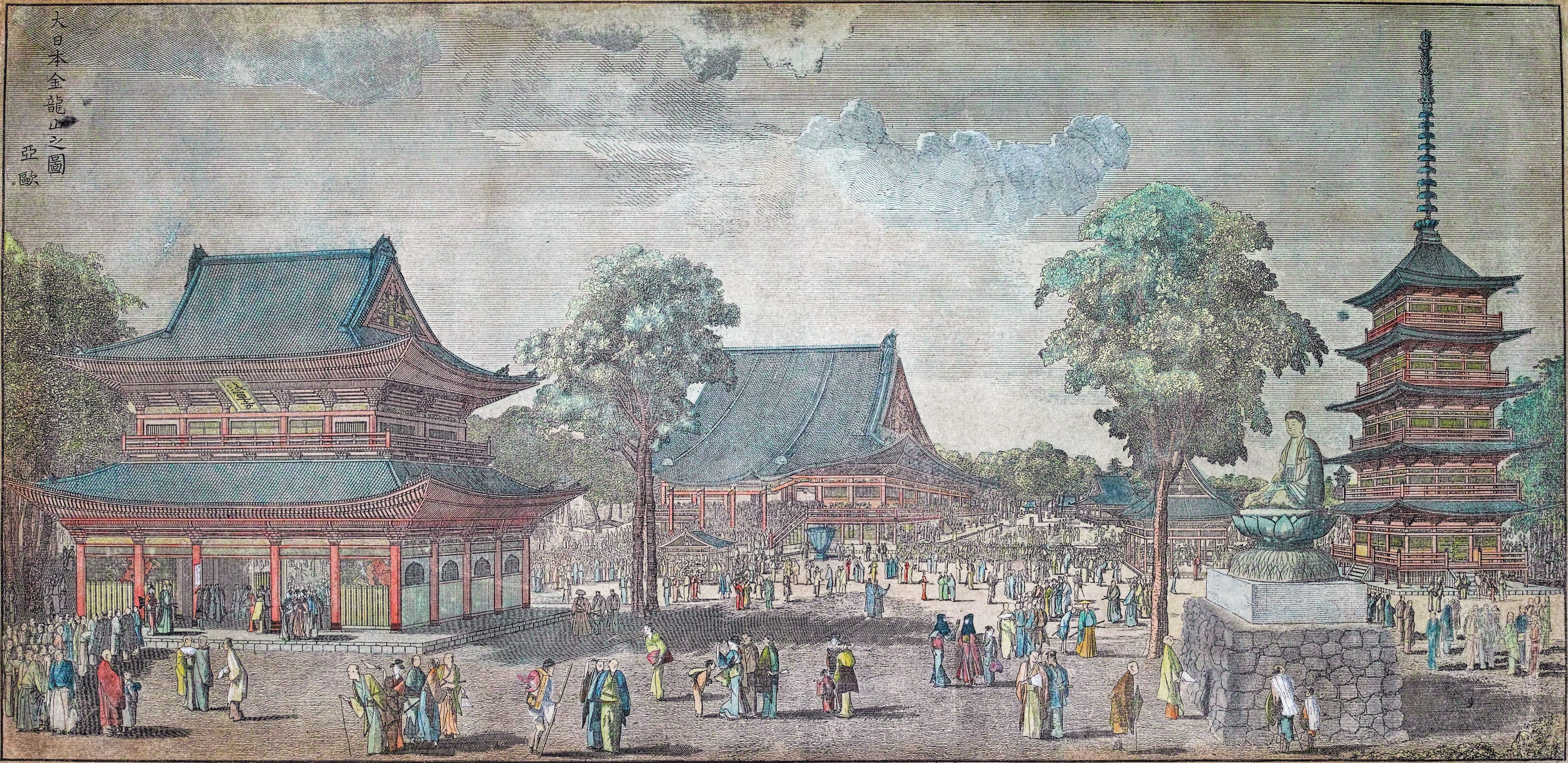
An 1809 etched print of the Senso-ji temple, before it was firebombed during World War II and rebuilt

On 18 March, 628, fisherman and brothers Hinokuma and Hamanari Takenari allegedly caught a gold statue of Kannon, the Goddess of Mercy, from the Sumida. They gave it to their liege, Haji-no-Nakamoto, who decided to enshrine the statue. The location would be the Asakusa Kannon temple, or Sensō-ji, which may be Japan's earliest religious temple, completed in 645. Sensō-ji was firebombed during World War II; when the main hall's remains were excavated, 7th and 8th-century "religious implements and tiles of continental Asian origin" were found. This hints at the statue possibly being of Korean origin. The temple was later rebuilt and served as a spiritual symbol of Japan's resurgence post-war.

In 646, the upland region of Tokyo was recorded as Musashi, likely coming from the Ainu word muzasi (wilderness of weeds). In the 8th century, Musashi had a governor who lived in Fuchu. A road was opened from Kozuke (modern Gunma Prefecture) to Fuchu through an uninhabited plain. Sometime in the 8th century, Koreans moved into the plain, evident in the site name Komagori, near modern Hannō.

In 737, Emperor Shomu of Nara ordered the construction of a Buddhist temple and monastery at every region the Yamato people live in. This led to the building of the Kokubunji temple in modern west Tokyo, which has visible remnants today.

== Heian period (794–1331) ==
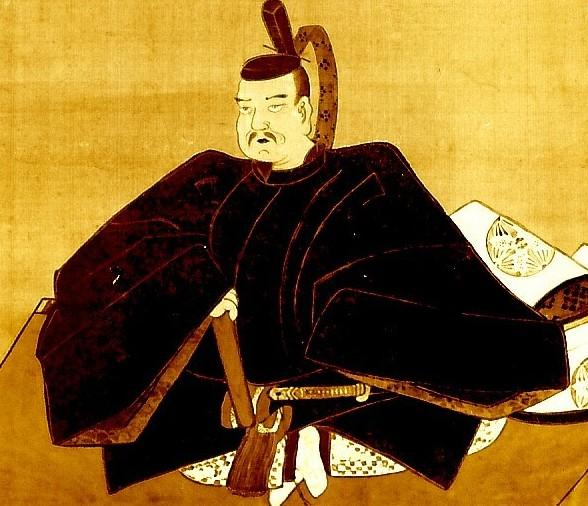
Taira no Masakado, who challenged the Emperor by becoming the effective ruler of Kanto

Tokyo's nature is described in Heian writings, including the Manyoshu, and in 880 Ariwara no Narihira, who describes using a ferry to cross the Sumida. Narihira's poem about seagulls over the Sumida is likely the origin of the bird as one of Tokyo's symbols.

In the 10th century, an imperial member of the Taira clan, Taira Makasodo, started fighting his imperial-descending neighbors, notably the Minamoto clan. In 935, these quarrels turned into a war, and he also began fighting other Taira. In 938, his army took over a government base in a nearby province, effectively making him the overlord of the Kanto region, and a threat to the emperor's authority. He was killed in 940. The fighting between the Taira and Minamoto later grew into a full civil war.

By the 11th century, Kanto was home to new colonists, including the Shibuya clan, who made a stronghold that became the namesake for the modern Shibuya district. The royal Lady Sarashima, wrote in Sarashina Nikki about moving from Kyoto (Japan's then-capital) to a northwest province in 1120. She describes nature similar to Tokyo, and mentions a location named Takeshiba, which is theorized to be in modern day Mita. Around this time, the area's rival clans divided the land amongst themselves. These areas were shoen.

By the 12th century, a medieval society had formed around Tokyo, ran by a bureaucratic aristocracy described by author Stephen Mansfield as being incompetent. It was located in Musashino's Kuku domain. The kuku-fu (provincial capital) was at Fuchu. The name Edo was first used around this time. It likely meant "door to the cove" or similar, referring to Edo Bay. The first recorded use of the word was when a man named Chichibu Shigetsugu changed his first name to Edo. He likely named himself after his home, a mound by the sea at Kojimachi. A 12th century lord Imai Kanehira also lived at the Shigetsugu residence.

A Minamoto member of the Imperial Court, Minamoto no Yoritomo, broke away from the court in 1180. At Kamakura, south of Edo, he set up Japan's first shogunate, a feudal lord system of governance that followed a warrior code. One of his vassals was Edo Shigenaga, Shigetsugu's son. Shigenaga was rewarded by the shogunate with patches of land around Edo, including the village Kitami. In 1185, the Minamoto defeated the Taira. A road from Kamakura to Edo, and the Kozuke-Fuchu road, were used by armed bands on their way to fight battles in the Middle Ages.

== Kamakura and Muromachi periods (1185–1573) ==
After 1185, a Minamoto branch that settled in Kozuke would eventually become the Tokugawa clan, who ruled Edo from the 17th to the 19th centuries.

Around 1439, the Uesugi clan in Kanto was made up of two families: the Yamanouchi and Ogigayatsu, who switched been being allies or enemies. The Yamaouchi gained control of the Kanto governor who lived in Kamakura, and the Ogigayatsu supported them. Ōta Dōkan was appointed in 1455 as a vassal to the Ogigayatsu head Sadamasa, who served Kyoto's Ashikaga shogunate. Sadamasa commissioned him to build camp-like "castles" across the Musashi plain. In 1456, entering Edo, the Edo family still living there left, avoiding a fight with the Uesugi. They moved to their property in Kitami, giving their land and castle to Dōkan.

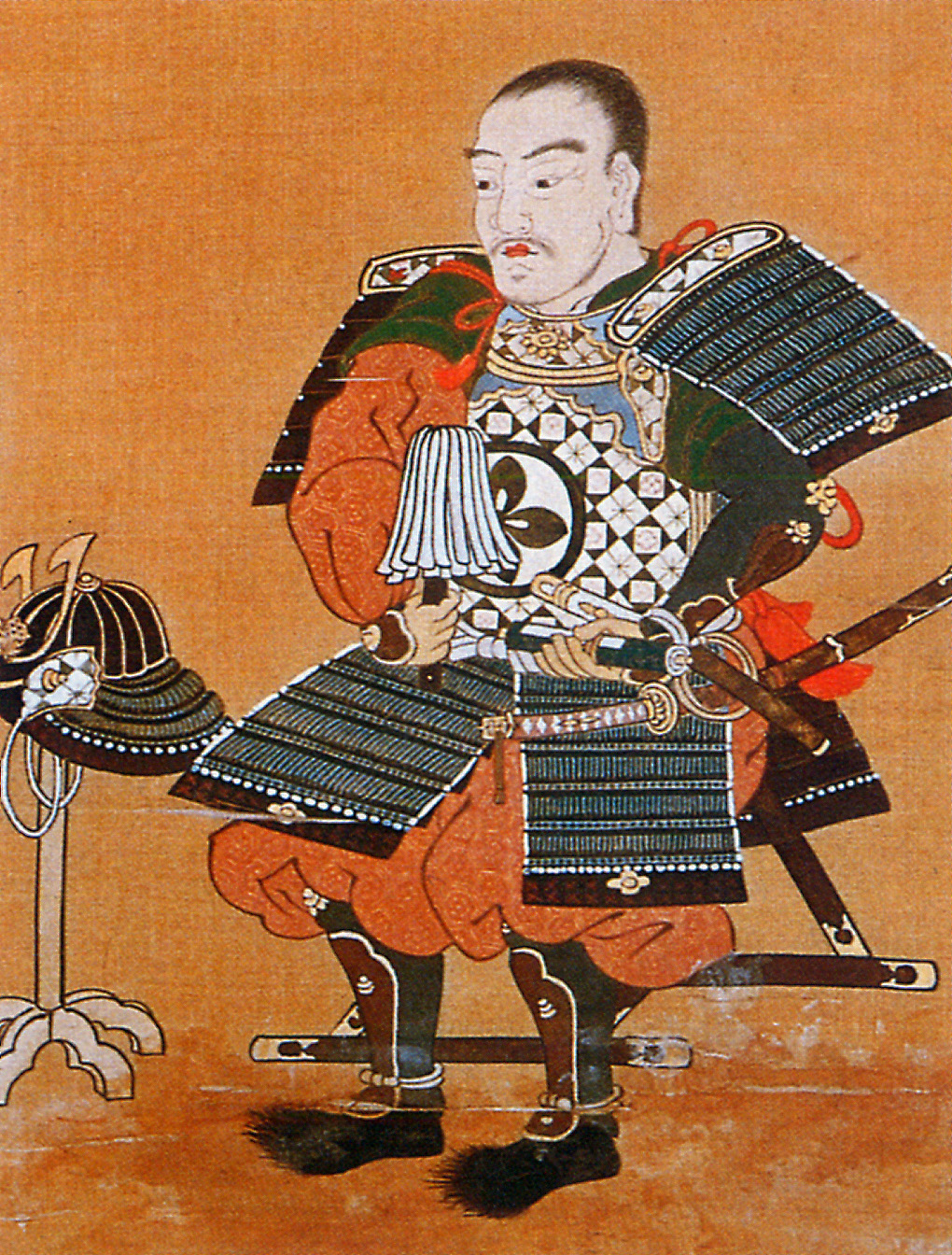
Ōta Dokan, who built the start to Edo Castle

Edo Castle began construction in 1457 at the modern Imperial Palace's East Garden. It was west of the Edo village, at the Chiyoda peasant village. The castle was in a strategic spot, as it was defensible and near the multiple rivers' estuaries. Boats could anchor near the castle. The Chiyoda peasants were moved away for construction. At the time, the castle was more of a square camp with "earthen embankments" featuring landscaping projects, fences, a few buildings, and wells. Shrines and temples were built nearby, and the dock turned into a center for Chinese goods. The name Chiyoda was later given to an area in Tokyo's center.

After 1458, Dōkan stayed in the Edo region, conquered the plain, and gained a correspondence with the emperor. At the time, the villages of Hibiya, Iigura, Iwaida, Mita, Sakurada, Shiba and Takarada were present. The suffixes ta or da in Japanese place names implies rice cultivation. At some point, Dōkan had the Hachiman shrine built on the Ichigaya hill. A second shrine was built next to Hachiman, likely honoring his family, as their mon (emblem), the kikyo flower, is present. In the late 15th century, the Yamanouchi and Ogigayatsu fought. Dōkan was loyal to Sadamasa, but Sadamasa was suspicious and jealous of him. In 1486, Sadamasa invited Dōkan to his house and murdered him. Dōkan's tomb is in the Doshoin temple near Mount Oyama. He is considered Edo's founder, and there are multiple monuments to him at Tokyo City Hall and the Imperial Palace. The Ōta clan survived as minor nobles for 300 years after.

=== Later history ===
The plains were not safe for travelers. The bandit Owada Dogen gained a dangerous reputation there. However, villagers in Shibuya likely had sympathy for him, as he was a fugitive from a 1526 battle that ended the Shibuya clan. A hill was named Dōgenzaka after him, which is now a street in Shibuya.

The Uesugi conflict led to the Hojo clan gaining power in Kanto. In 1524, at Kawagoe, Hojo Oitsuna fought against Uesugi Tomo, and captured Edo Castle. The castle later belonged to the Koga family's Ashikaga Shigeuji, and then the Hojo again. The Hojo's representative at Edo was Toyama Kaganao. In 1563, Ōta Dōkan's great-grandson failed an attempt to recapture the castle. For a long time, the castle stayed Hojo property.

== Azuchi-Momoyama period (1568–1600) ==
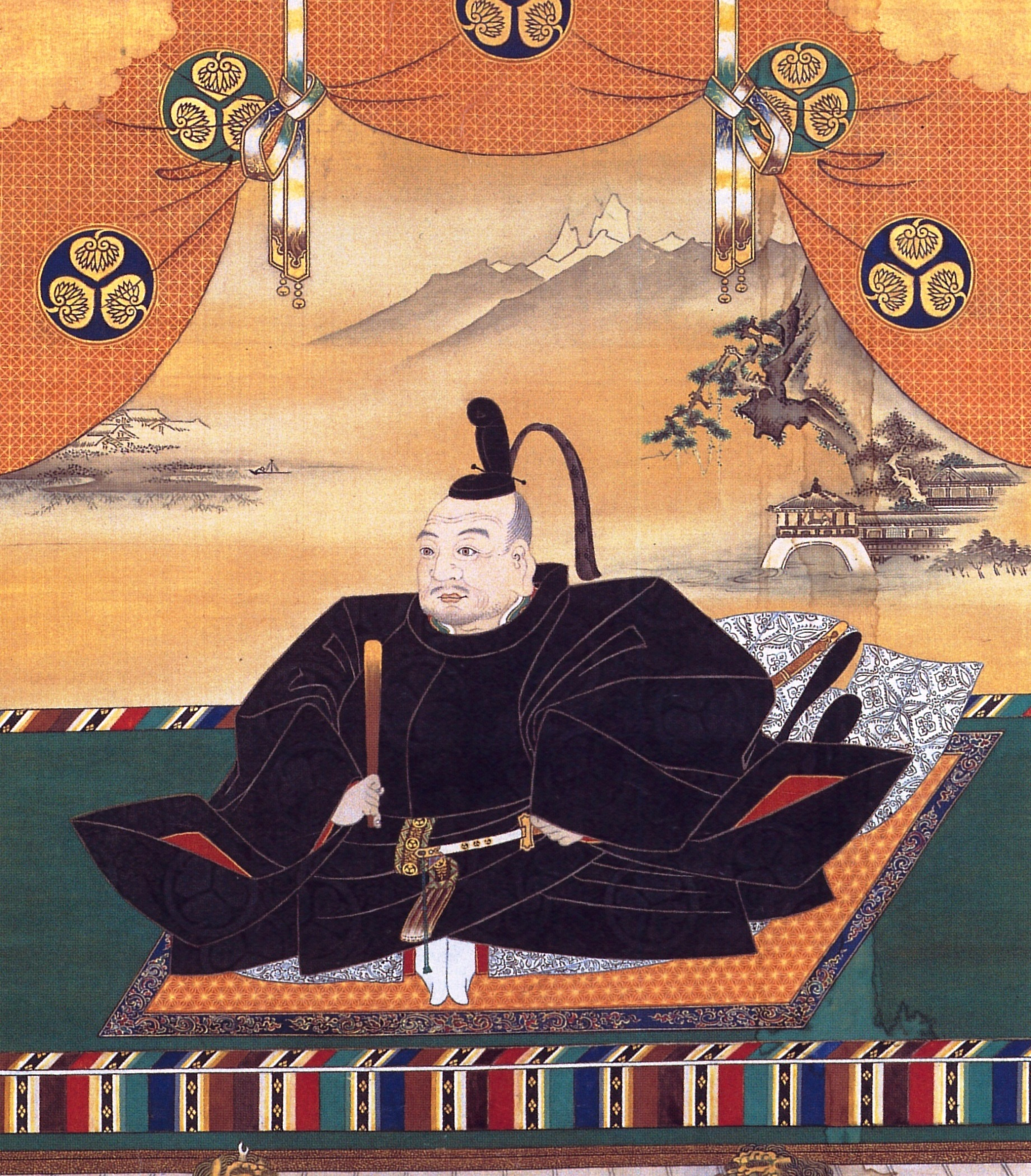
Tokugawa Ieyasu, who made Edo the capital of his shogunate.

From 1560 to 1582, Oda Nobunaga's army overthrew the Ashikaga Shogunate, and unified half of the country. He did not seem to have interest in Edo. Nobunaga's successor, Toyotomi Hideyoshi, continued Nobunaga's conquests. Hideyoshi and his army's commander, the Tokugawa Ieyasu, took control of the Hojo in 1589. Hideyoshi unexpectedly gave Ieyasu the gift of Hojo territories in Kanto as a fief, if Ieyasu gave him his territories in the south. This was an attempt to neutralize Ieyasu as a potential threat by moving him away from Kyoto. In 1590, Ieyasu visiting Edo was considered crucial to the city's legitimacy. In 1598, after Hideyoshi died, there was struggle to be shogun between Ieyasu and Hideyoshi's vassals. Ieyasu won at the Battle of Sekigahara in 1600. Ieyasu started building a new government's capital in Edo. He dictated the social structure Mansfield calls "the most well-managed feudal society the world has ever known".

== Tokugawa period, 1600–1700 ==
The Tokugawa period began when the Imperial Court appointed Ieyasu shōgun in 1603, starting the Tokugawa shogunate. Japan's imperial seat and official capital remained in Kyoto, but the Emperor was virtually powerless; Ieyasu was the effective ruler of Japan, and Edo became powerful as the capital.

The Tokugawa political system rested on both feudal and bureaucratic controls, so Edo lacked a unitary administration. The social order was composed of warriors, peasants, artisans, and businessmen, the latter two classes organized in guilds. Businessmen were excluded from government office, so they made their own economic center of activity. Edo was harsh toward outcast groups. It imposed restrictions on people known as kawata, eta, and hinin (nonhuman). Officials created the Burakumin outcast order for all of Japan. Fear of "pollution" and "impurity" helped determine who was discriminated against. Even in modern Japan, many descendants of burakumin are poor, and live in Arakawa, Sumida, and Taito.

A social hierarchy chart based on old academic theories. Such hierarchical diagrams were removed from Japanese textbooks after various studies in the 1990s revealed that peasants, craftsmen, and merchants were in fact equal and merely social categories. Successive shoguns held the highest or near-highest court ranks, higher than most court nobles.

To assure a peaceful succession, in 1605, Ieyasu chose his successors to be his son, Tokugawa Hidetada, and his grandson, Tokugawa Iemitsu. In 1616, Ieyasu died, and was succeeded by Hidetada. Hidetada finished the shogun government structure, and continued Ieyasu's ban on Christianity, executing the first Christians under this law. To enforce the law, he made it so Westerners could only contact Japan at the cities of Nagasaki and Hirado, banning them from the rest of the country. In 1623, Hidetada retired, and was succeeded by Iemitsu. Hidetada, however, remained in power until he died in 1632. The daimyo no longer threatened the shogun's power, and Iemitsu strengthened himself by removing the emperor's remaining duties. He established criteria regarding how his government would be run.

=== Early century development ===
The 176 fudai daimyō (inside lords) that supported Ieyasu in his campaign were allocated land near Edo castle to build estates on. The 68 tozama daimyō (other lords), nobleman who were not associates, lived in "peripheral zones", where they formed allegiances to survive. Around 70% of Edo's land was devoted to the residencies of daimyo and samurai. Temples and shrines accounted for 14%, leaving 16% for the commoners, a much larger class than the others. The merchants grew in wealth by building shops. The service class rented homes in the back streets and alleys. Their homes, ura nagaya (rear long-houses), were made up of units. Each unit's living area was not much larger than 3 square meters. An entire family might live there, and single men often lived there to be closer to their countryside family. Those men worked lower-class jobs. Some of them were struggling ronin (masterless samurai). Ronin were cast out of service for misdemeanors, or their masters were disgraced and stripped of privileges. Lower-class areas had communal facilities contained dumps, toilets, and wells, and had problems with heat and rats. The homes of wealthy merchants, shopkeepers, and temple lottery winners were superior, located on wider streets, and their roofs were somewhat fire-resistant.

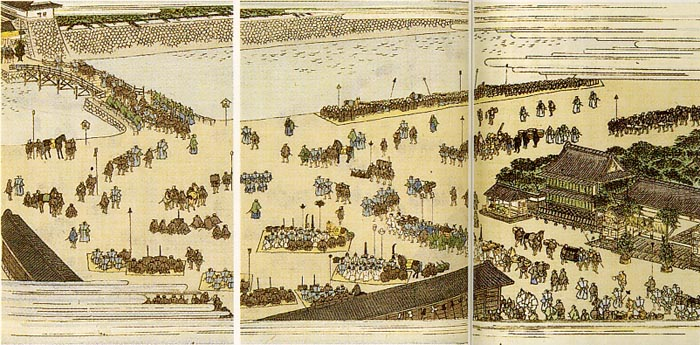
A scene from the Tokugawa Seiseiroku, showing an aspect of the sankin-kōtai system: the festive attendance day of daimyo at Edo Castle

There was a system called sankin-kōtai (alternative residence), in which daimyo were required to live both in Edo and their home province. As a "divide-and-rule" strategy, half of the lords were required to travel from their home province to Edo once a year, and vice versa. Their returns and departures were met with celebrations. Daimyo were also supposed to leave their family permanently in Edo. On the main roads in Edo, barriers said "no women out, no weapons in". The system contributed to making the city a military citadel.

==== City planning ====
Both the fudai and tozama daimyo had to supply "labor, funds, and materials" for construction projects, which altogether were tenka-fushin (construction of the realm). The construction of water systems and roads around the city eased the movement of "officials, merchants, and goods", and allowed more people to take pilgrimages to holy sites.

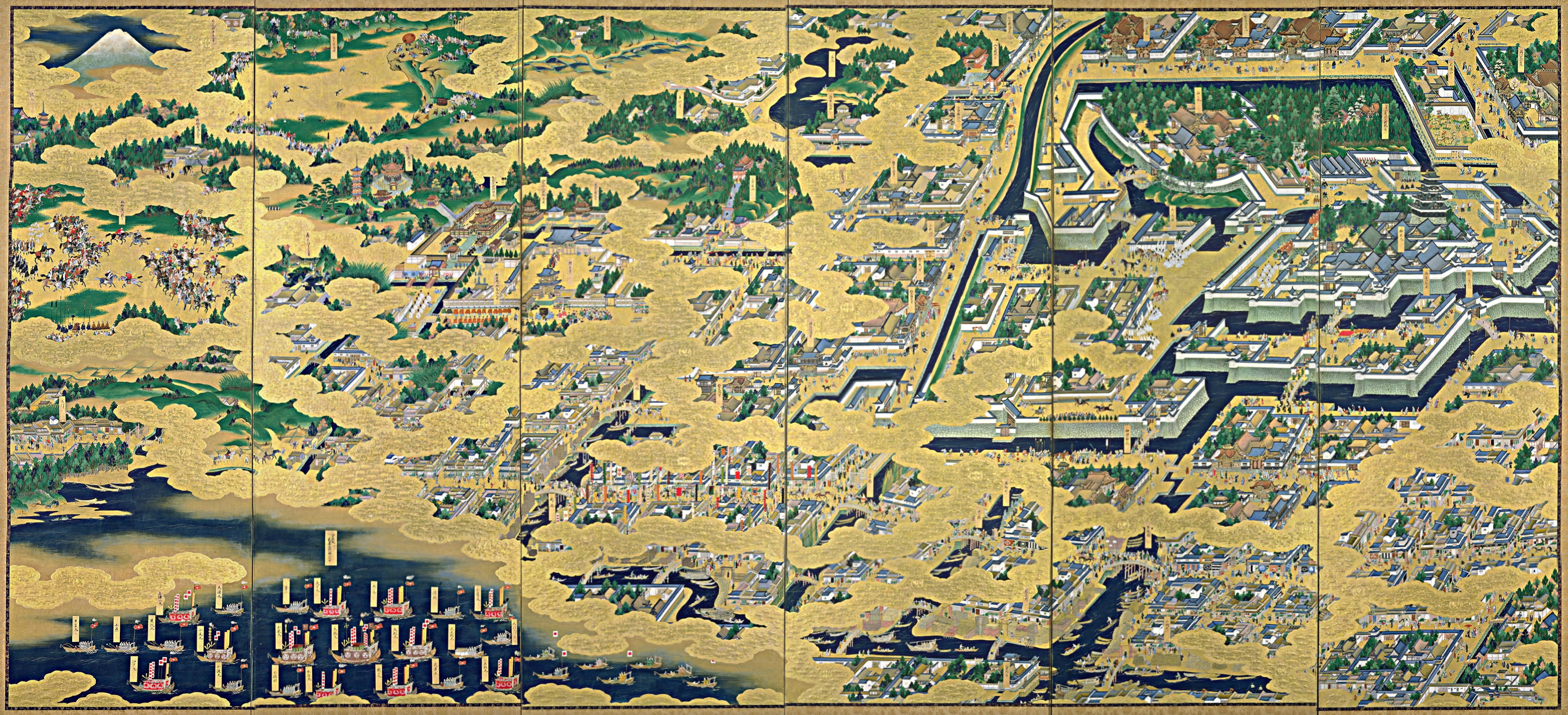
Folding screen view of Edo in the 17th century, showing Edo Castle on the upper right corner

Another way Ieyasu worked to defend the city was to create steep-walled alleys between the city and surrounding moats. Earth was taken from the Izu Peninsula. 3,000 ships carried the earth to the dock, and dragged to its proper location by teams of laborers using ox carts, aided by placing the rocks on seaweed and entertainers. The moats derived from the Kanda River (which is still the case). The concentration of water channels, estates and alleys formed a protective center around Edo Castle. The city seemed impenetrable, but nobody tested its strength. The castle's outer enclosures were completed in 1606, and was wholly completed in 1640. It was the city's most important location; Buddhist temples faced the castle, and it was at the center of most maps. This expansion caused the moving of Ieyasu's favorite shrine to Kanda.

Three major areas started in the early shogunate: Harajuku, Marunouchi, and Shinjuku. Harajuku was an area for residencies of samurai retainers set up near a new protective garrison on the western road to town. It was irrigated with a waterwheel from the Sumida, but the land was not very rewarding for farmers, who became impoverished. Marunouchi (within the moat) was named after 1635, when Edo Castle was expanding and many daimyo moved to homes between the castle walls and the moat. Others moved to the village of Yotsuya, the site of a watchtower on the road into town, which eventually became Shinjuku.

==== Religion and development ====
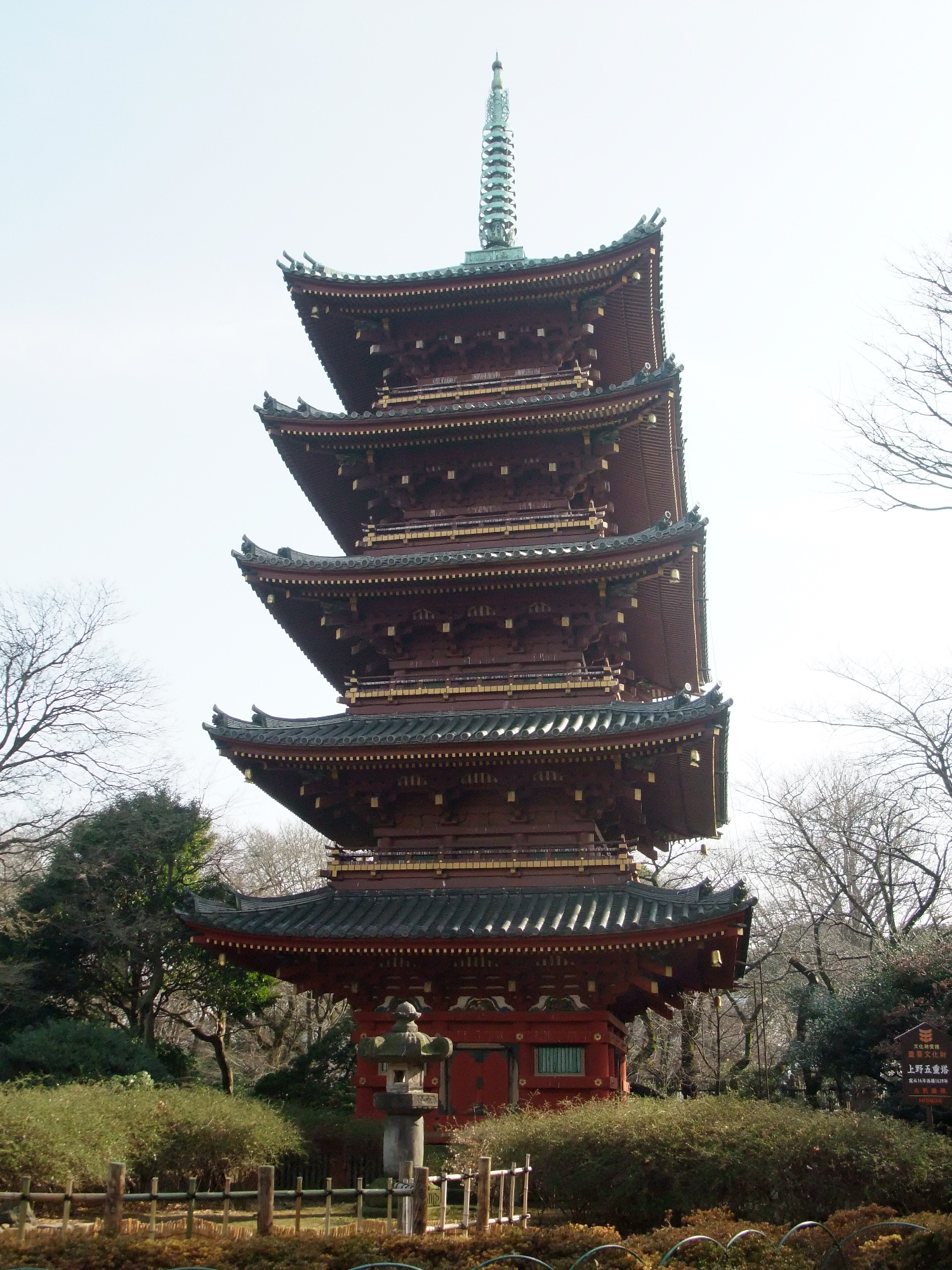
The five-story pagoda of Kan'ei-ji, which was constructed during the reign of Tokugawa Hidetada and required the building of the Kimon (Devil's Gate)

The city plan resembled the Taoist yin-yang, which was also in Shinto. Chinese geomancy determined various city features; the east, home of the Cyan Dragon, required a waterway that used the Sumida. The White Tiger's west needed a major highway, but this was already the Tokaido road. The Vermillion Bird's south needed a pond, which became a surrogate of the Edo Bay. The Dark Warrior and Gembu's north needed a mountain; Mount Fuji was used, but was located to the west. The whole city was built with a rotation of 90 degrees counter-clockwise, and later, the Ote-mon main gate of the castle was moved south to east. Other notable roads were the west Koshu-kaido, which ran from Edo to Nagano (its first stop was Shinjuku), the southwest Daisendo, and the northeast Nakasendo.

In 1624, Tokugawa Hidetada asked Tenkai to construct a temple in the northeast corner of Ueno; that direction was the "source of evil", so to block it, the Kimon (Devil's Gate) was constructed. The temple would be Kan'ei-ji. Later shoguns continued building barriers there, and added 36 sub-temples. The evil was supposed to flow diagonally, but southeast of Kan'ei-ji, the Jōdo-shū temple Zojo-ji was previously built in Shiba in 1598. The Zojo-ji complex was large, surrounded by 48 sub-temples and the two shoguns' mausoleums. Many religious sects in the city, including Shu-gendo devoted themselves to worshipping Mount Fuji or its deities. The mountain was considered by many to be the closest peak to heaven, and in their temples worshiping mountain deities, a miniature Fuji was created for people to scale when they were unable to climb the actual mountain. Prayers were given from the miniatures' tops to the sun every "mountain-opening day".

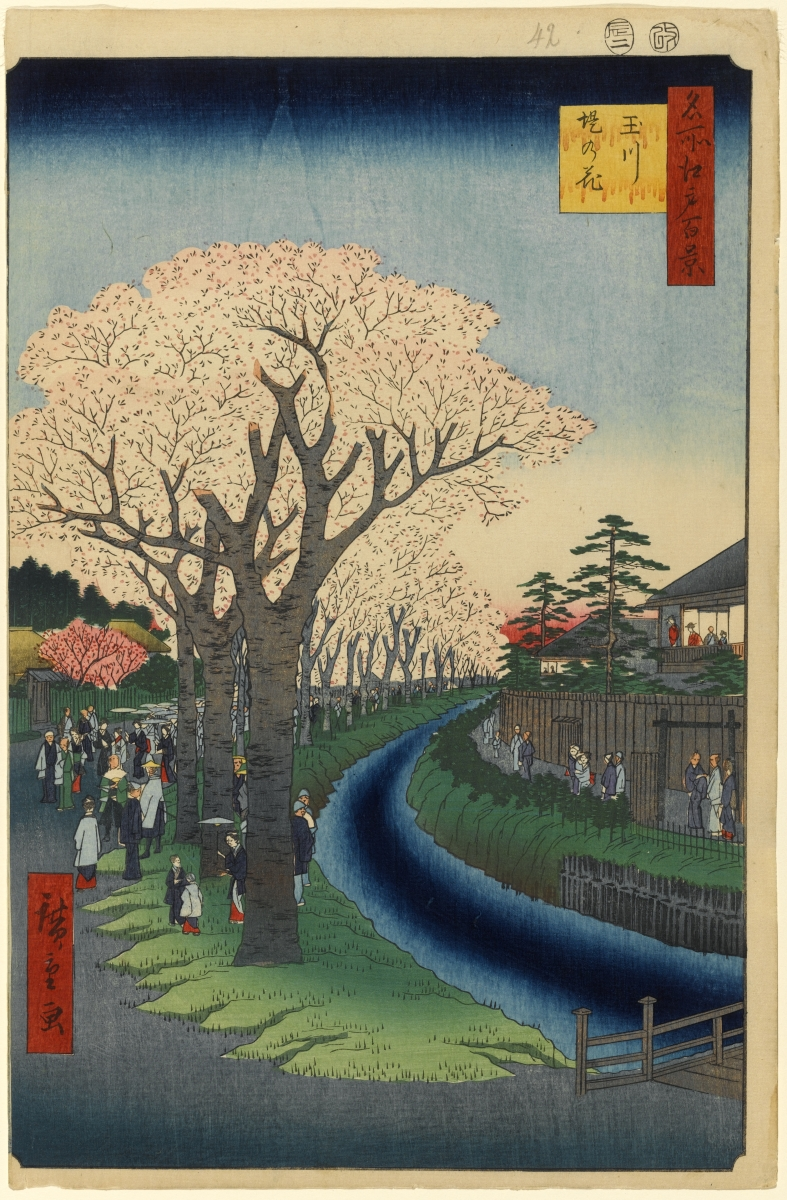
A section of the Tamagawa Josui in an 1856 painting by Hiroshige

==== Water systems ====
The eastern Hibiya inlet was filled in using dirt from the northern hill Surugadai. Landfills were created with dirt from the northern and western Yamanote hills, and the Dosanbori Canal was created to move construction materials. The canal's construction was used by Ieyasu to test his supporters' loyalty, and to deplete the resources of his suspected rivals. Early attempts to bore wells only drew salt water, so the Kanda Josui was built. It was a 17-kilometer water system, made up of over 3,600 sub-aqueducts. The subterranean sections used hollowed-out timber to bring water to each well. This first became operational during the Kanei era, and was more advanced than the European water systems. The Kanda Josui later reached capacity, so the Tamagawa Josui was built in Tama from 1652 to 1654. It was 80 kilometers long and transported water from every part of the city. To improve water quality by stopping waste disposal in rivers, huts and latrines near the rivers were removed.

=== Health and food ===
In a regular year, the Sumida River flooded twice, creating mud in nearby districts. The water systems created mosquitoes that infested Edo in the summer. A large fish market operated at Shiba. Just outside of the castle, the Yokkaichi (Fourth-day market) sold fish from Kamakura. At fish markets, insects and rodents were common. This contributed to measles, smallpox, and beriberi. Beriberi was caused by nutritional deficiencies in the common diet, which consisted of only white rice. It was called the "Edo disease". The city's largest rice granaries were at Kuramae, where rice from the domains stayed before going to the shogun. Rice merchants became wealthy. Meat was not usually eaten due to Buddhist beliefs, but was used as a supposed elixir, and could be bought at the Yotsuya hunter's market, or at butcher's shops near "Komadome Bridge".

=== Death and crime ===
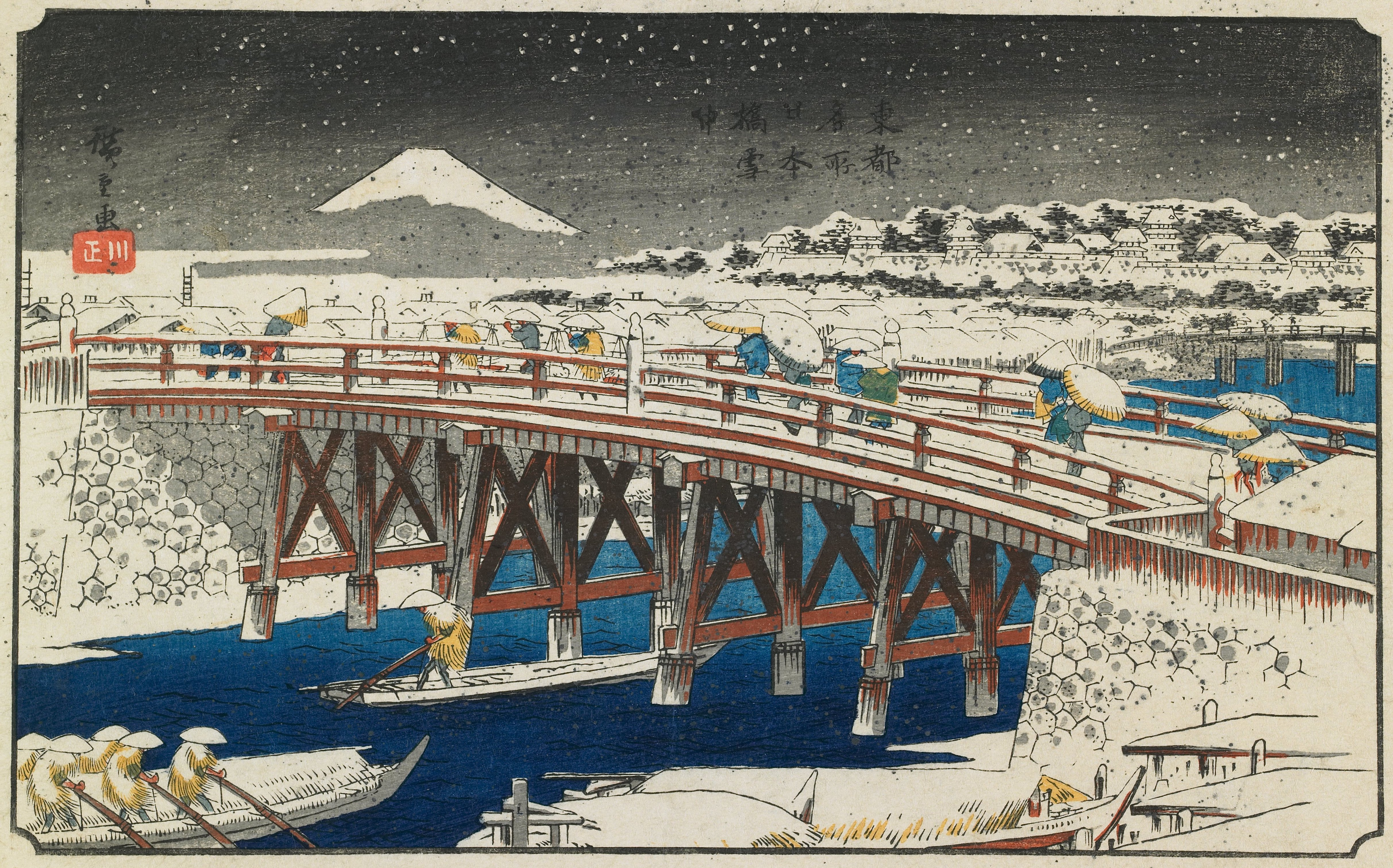
Nihonbashi Bridge, in a c. 1838–1842 painting by Hiroshige

Honorable citizens were buried in family graves at temples, but criminals were executed. Generally, executions were performed at the city prison in Kodenmacho, but crucifixions and burnings at the stake were done at Shinagawa's Suzugamori execution grounds, where 150,000 died before the practice stopped in the mid-19th century. Some execution grounds were by the Tokaido road, warning the travelers. Another location was the northeast Kotsukappara execution grounds, opened in 1651 near Minami Senju. 200,000 heads were displayed on stakes there. The groups who disposed of bodies, honorable or dishonorable, were the hinin and eta. Their descendants were burakumin.

Built in 1603, Nihonbashi Bridge was the starting point for the Tokaido road, and thus many major trunk roads. It became the zero point for distance measurements. The bridge's ends had important bulletin boards. Adulterers and sexual offenders were placed in fetters at the south end. Nearby, murderers were buried with their heads protruding from the ground. A saw was placed nearby, and anyone could use the saw to sever a head, which would be placed at a pike on the bridge. These methods effectively deterred crime. The nearby area would become a trade district under the Mitsui family's leadership.

=== Disasters ===
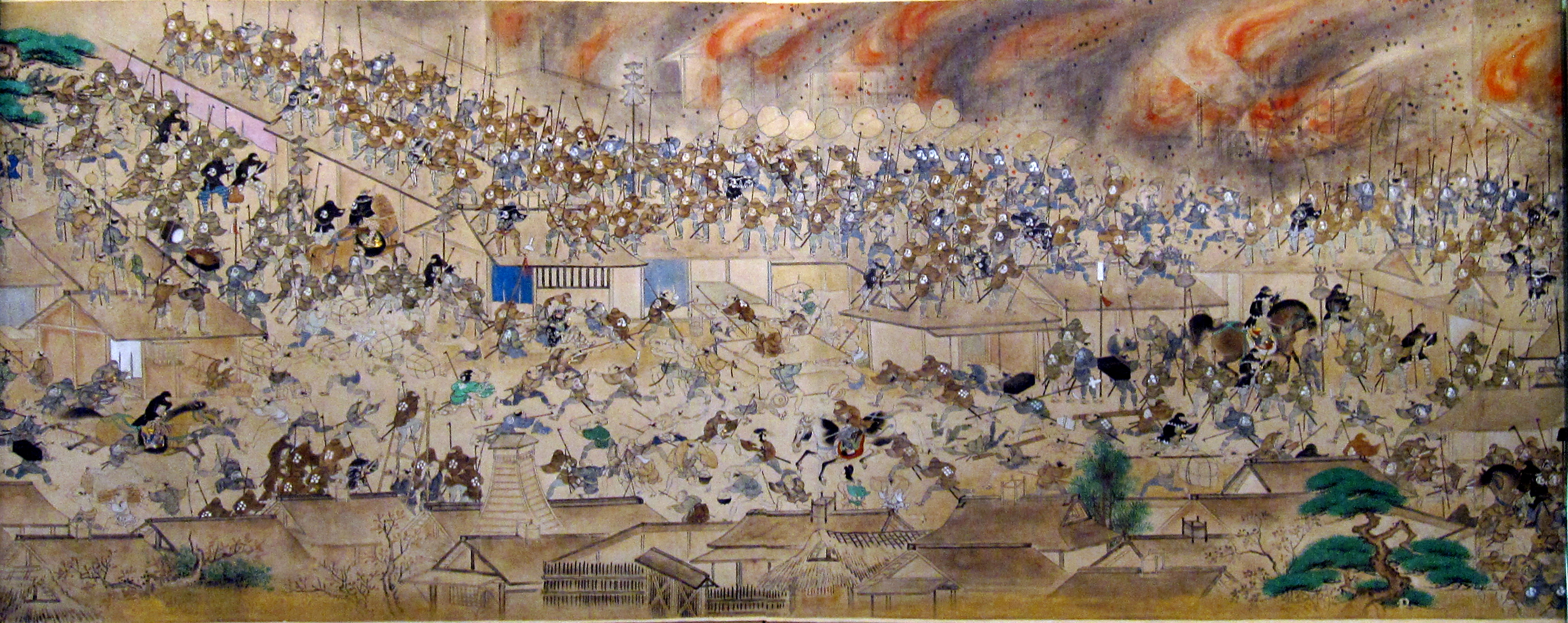
An 1814 handscroll depicting the Great Fire of Meireki

The Great Fire of Meireki, started on 18 January 1657. It spread because of Japan's dry winter winds and the city's wooden structures. It started in the morning, at an exorcism at the Honmyo-ji temple in Hongo, for a kimono that had been worn by three women who died prematurely. Wind brought fire from the kimono to the roof of a nearby temple. Powerful westerly winds blew the fire to Surugudai and Yushima, and then Asakusa, Kobickicho, Nihonbashi, and Tsukudajima. That fire burned out, but a second in Koishikawa, the samurai district, went on to destroy Edo Castle and many warriors' residences. The prisoners at the Kodenmacho prison and authorities struck a deal that the prisoners would be released, and they meet up at a nearby temple. After they were released, other authorities thought the prisoners were trying to escape and loot the city. The city gates were closed, trapping civilians inside. That evening, the Ko-jimachi quarter had more fires. The fires continued for a second day. Rice was distributed to citizens from the shogun's granaries. A day later, it snowed, and many people died of starvation (despite the distribution of rice) and hypothermia. Two-thirds of the city's buildings were destroyed: 1,200 merchants' homes, 930 daimyo residencies, 350 temples and shrines, and 61 bridges. 108,000 people died.

Edo's fires were named Edo no hana (flowers of Edo). In 1688, another fire in Edo lasted for 45 days, and an earthquake and fire both occurred in 1694.

=== Late century development ===
Yotsuya was renamed Shinjuku (new lodge) after the fire, because it was a "new lodge" for many people who had their homes destroyed in the fire and needed to move to Yotsuya, which remained unharmed.

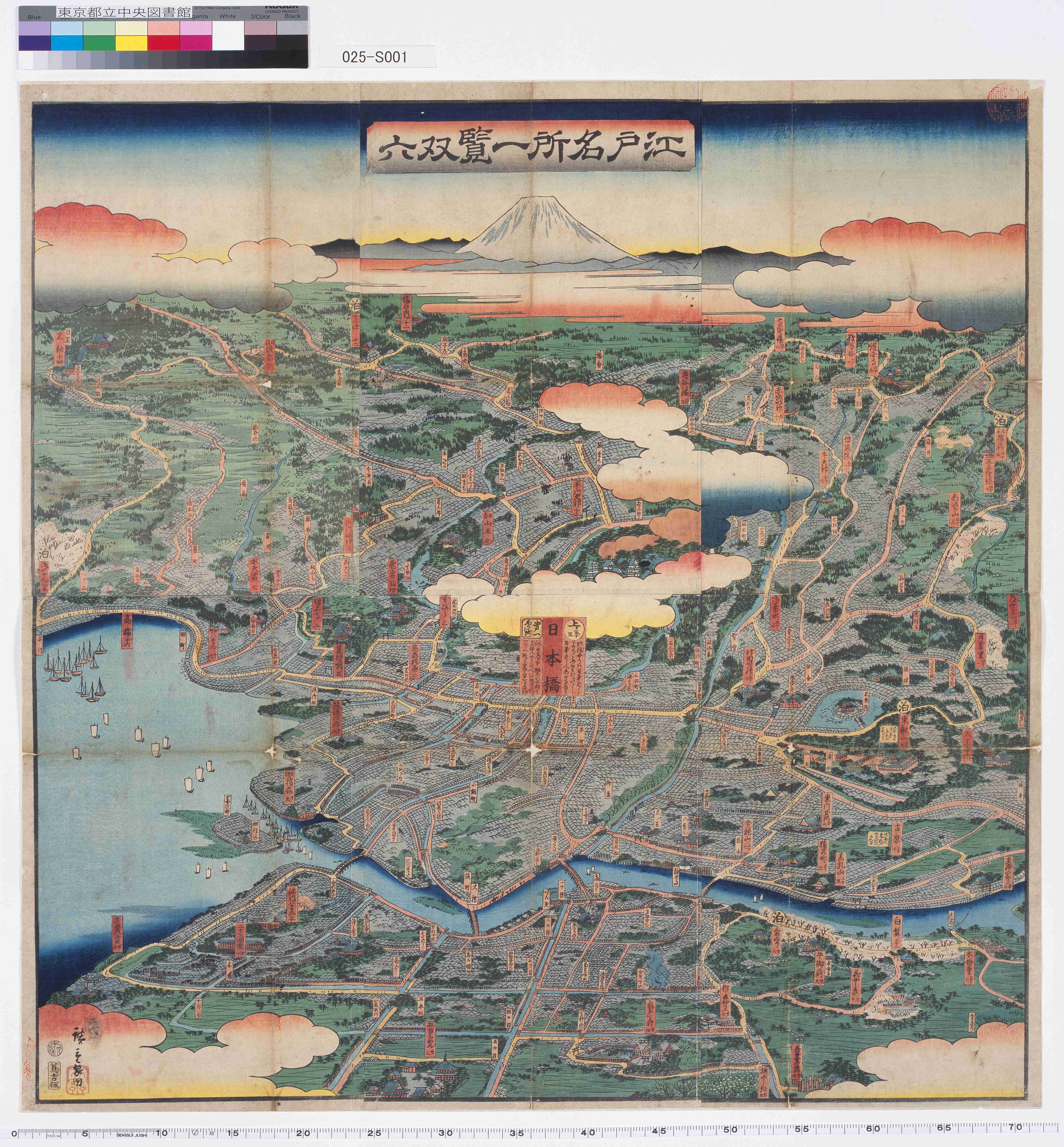
This 1858 map shows the yamanote western district (at top) and the shitamachi eastern district (at bottom). Nihonbashi is at center.

The city was rebuilt with streets and firebreaks, and merchants were made to fireproof their homes and stores with plaster. Lumberyards were moved from Hatchobori to the Fukagawa marsh, seen as less incendiary. This led to land reclamation, new docks and storage yards, and the shitamachi moving further east. Burnt dirt from Meireki and other fires were used to reclaim marshes. Rebuilding made lumber tycoons like Bunzaemon Kinokuniya significant money. The Ryogoku Bashi bridge was built over the Sumida River, starting development in the city's east. Expansion meant formerly rural areas were now urban. Between Nihonbashi Bridge and the neighboring Edobashi Bridge, Edobashi Road became the site of much activity.

By the 1650s, Edo reached a population of 500,000, becoming Japan's largest city. Immigrants came from elsewhere in Japan. As the areas surrounding the central citadel grew, two notable communities formed: the Yamanote and Shitamachi. Two shitamachi communities were Nihonbashi and Kyobashi. Nihonbashi's large commodities store built in 1662, Shirokiya, became Tokyu Department Store. (Note: One notable figure from this era was Yaoya Oshichi, a grocer's daughter who became a folk hero. Elements of her story were fabricated over time. After a fire broke out near her parents' home in the winter of 1682, her family's shop was destroyed, and they moved to the Enjo-ji temple, which Oshichi loved. After Oshichi had to return home, she lit her house on fire, hoping to go back to Enjo-ji. She was put in jail. Unable to live apart from Enjo-it, she lied about being older to receive a death sentence, and got attention during her procession to Suzugimori.)

Some new residents in the city were foreigners. From 1660 to 1790, Dutch traders, restricted to Nagasaki's Dejima island, were forced to make annual delegatory trips to Edo, and perform certain ceremonies when they arrived. After 1790, tributaries had to be sent every four years. The Dutch were also required to send an annual report on world events, which continued until the mid-19th century, when Japan opened themselves to foreigners.

=== Red light districts ===
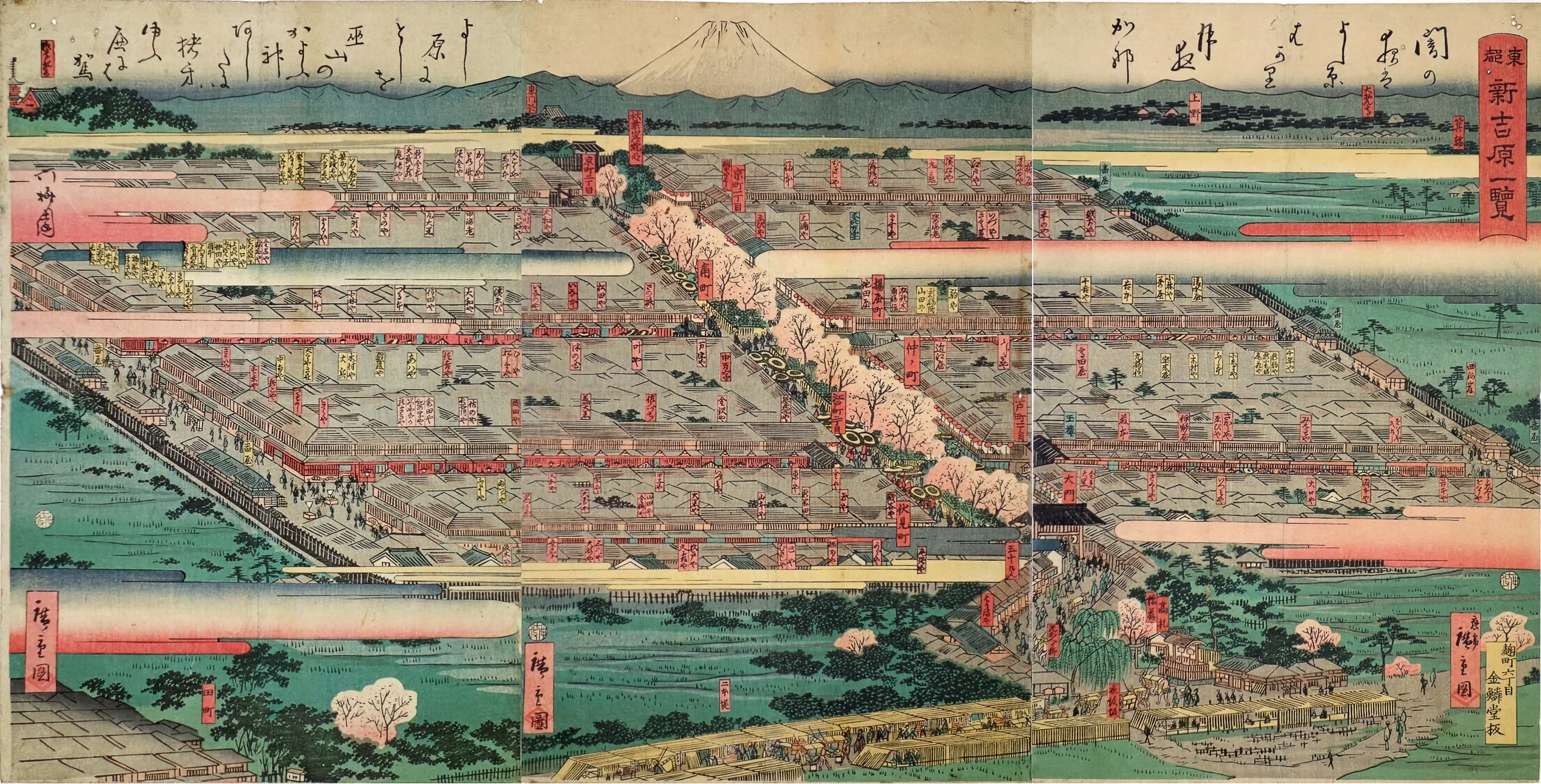
Tōto Shin-Yoshiwara ichiran (View of Shin-Yoshiwara in the Eastern Capital), an 1860 painting by Hiroshige II

After the Meireki Fire, the city attempted to dissolve theaters and the Yoshiwara red light district ("venues of moral degeneration") by moving them from Asakusa, east of the castle, to the northeast. However, they could be reached via chokibune boat rides from Yanagibashi, and through the Kanda River and Sanya Canal. For ease and economic purposes, entrepreneurs turned Yoshiwara into an unlicensed city district. The area was open at night, which benefited brothel owners. Officials did not like how the district became a social leveler, as the class-based social codes of the time did not apply there for men. The only requirement for entry was an admission fee, and amagasa hats were sold to hide people's identities.

The number of prostitutes there was 4,000 by 1780, and 7,000 by 1868. There were classes of prostitutes. The lower-ranking classes were the jiroro and the sancha. The higher-ranking tayu were much more skilled, fashionable and conversational. Prostitutes often received sexually-transmitted diseases. When they died, they were not widely mourned, and many were buried in an unmarked grave at the Jokan-ji temple in Minowa, a northern working-class district. Their bodies were dumped over a wall into the temple by brothel staff.

At Fukugawa, east of the city and outside its jurisdiction, new warehouses and lumberyards lead men to vastly outnumber women. This created the market for shops and teahouses staffed by prostitutes. Lower-ranking prostitutes lived in the district's back streets, and displayed themselves in windows. Fukugawa only flourished in the 1800s decade. By then, it was associated with the lower-class and Yoshiwara, the upper-class. A red light district in Shinjuku operated from 1698 to 1718, when it closed down. This shut down the town. It reopened 50 years later, eventually becoming one of the city's more prominent districts.

=== Art and entertainment ===
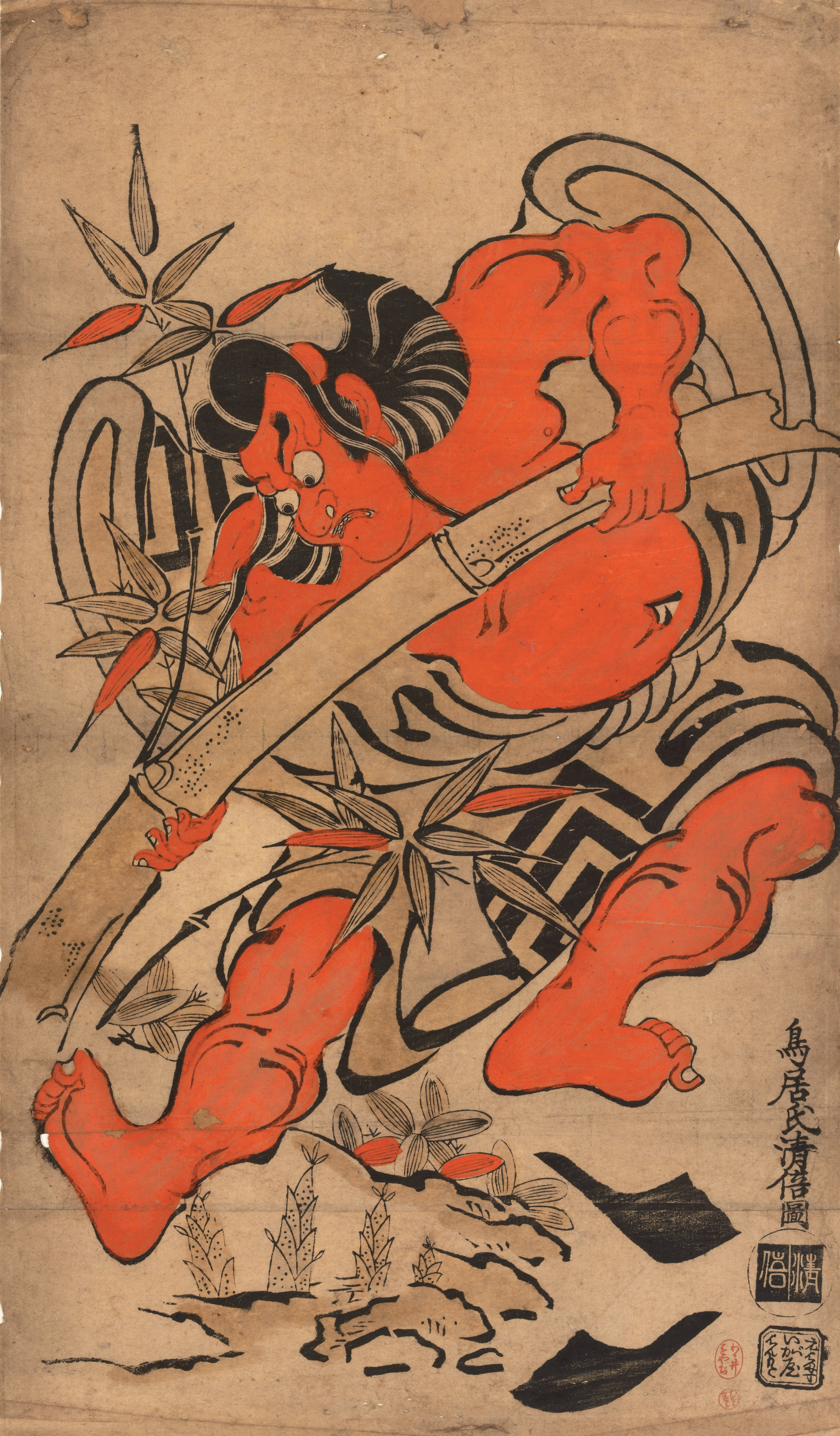
A Torii Kiyomasu painting of kabuki actor Ichikawa Danjuro I playing Soga Tokimune. This was likely one of the most popular ukiyo-e actor prints.

Yoshiwara was home to young artists, and became a "center of alternative culture", creating new fashion styles. One of the artists was the early ukiyo-e artist Hishikawa Monorobu. Another artist who depicted Edo street life was Suzuki Harunobu. There was a growing literary scene in the late century, as paper was cheaper and more people could read. Major booksellers first appeared in 1650, and published many fiction and nonfiction genres, including Confucian works. Physicians bought books about the West's medical advancements. Two major writers were Matsuo Basho and Saikaku. Books could either be bought expensive at book stores, or rented cheap by traveling salesmen. By the 1830s, when the city had over 800 book sellers, literacy rates in Edo were one of the highest in the world.

==== Live entertainment ====
Kabuki theater became popular. Initially performed by women, associated with prostitution, and transgressive, authorities despised kabuki. The first kabuki theater opened in Nakabashi in 1624, but was close to the castle, so it had to be moved to Negicho (modern Ningyocho), and then Sakaicho. Authorities could not get rid of kabuki. By 1714, there were three major theaters around Sakaicho, Ichimura-za, Morita-za, and Nakamura-za. As it became mainstream by the early 17th century, for various reasons, men started playing every role in kabuki. Kabukimono were men who stayed in theater outfits outside the theater, which delighted commoners and offended officials. One of the major actors was Ichikawa Danjuro I, who played heroic and masculine characters, and is still praised by modern actors.

For lower-class citizens like the Yoshiwara prostitutes, more affordable entertainment was available at yose (variety halls), which had comedians, dancers, jugglers, and storytellers. Similar were Hirokoji (open spaces), near main streets and bridges. The most important hirokoji was at the western end of the Ryogoku Bridge over the Sumida. Two other spaces were at the southeast corner of Shinobazu Pond, and at Okuyama, a patch of land behind Senso-ji.

== Tokugawa period, 1700–1800 ==
By 1720, Edo became the world's largest city, with an estimated 1.3 million people. The yamanote and shitamachi both had around 650,000; this highlights the disparity between the two groups, as the shitamachi had 16% of Edo's area. Edo's lead in social change and economic growth impacted all of Japan during the Tokugawa era, attracted immigrants, and created new markets and a higher standard of living.

Fukugawa became dependent on its waterways, as their economy was based on its warehouses and sale of oil, food, sake, fertilizer, and other commodities that had to be moved. Merchants from the adjacent Kiba received lumber from Fukugawa's wharves.

=== Daimyo and warriors in the 17th and 18th centuries ===
In the 17th and 18th centuries, ronin roamed the city streets. They were involved in riots and brawls, and became a problem for the shogunate. In the 1790s, the shogun's councilor, Matsudaira Sadanobu, created a detention center for ronin and general vagrants on the Sumida's artificial island of Tsukudajima. Losing money due to sankin-kōtai, warriors devoted less time to martial arts and more time to relaxation. Low-ranking hatamoto (bannermen) were troublesome as groups in their free time. One group was the Shiratsuka-Gumi (White Hilt Gang), who formed in the 1640s and were eliminated by authorities by the end of the 17th century.

==== Forty-seven ronin incident ====
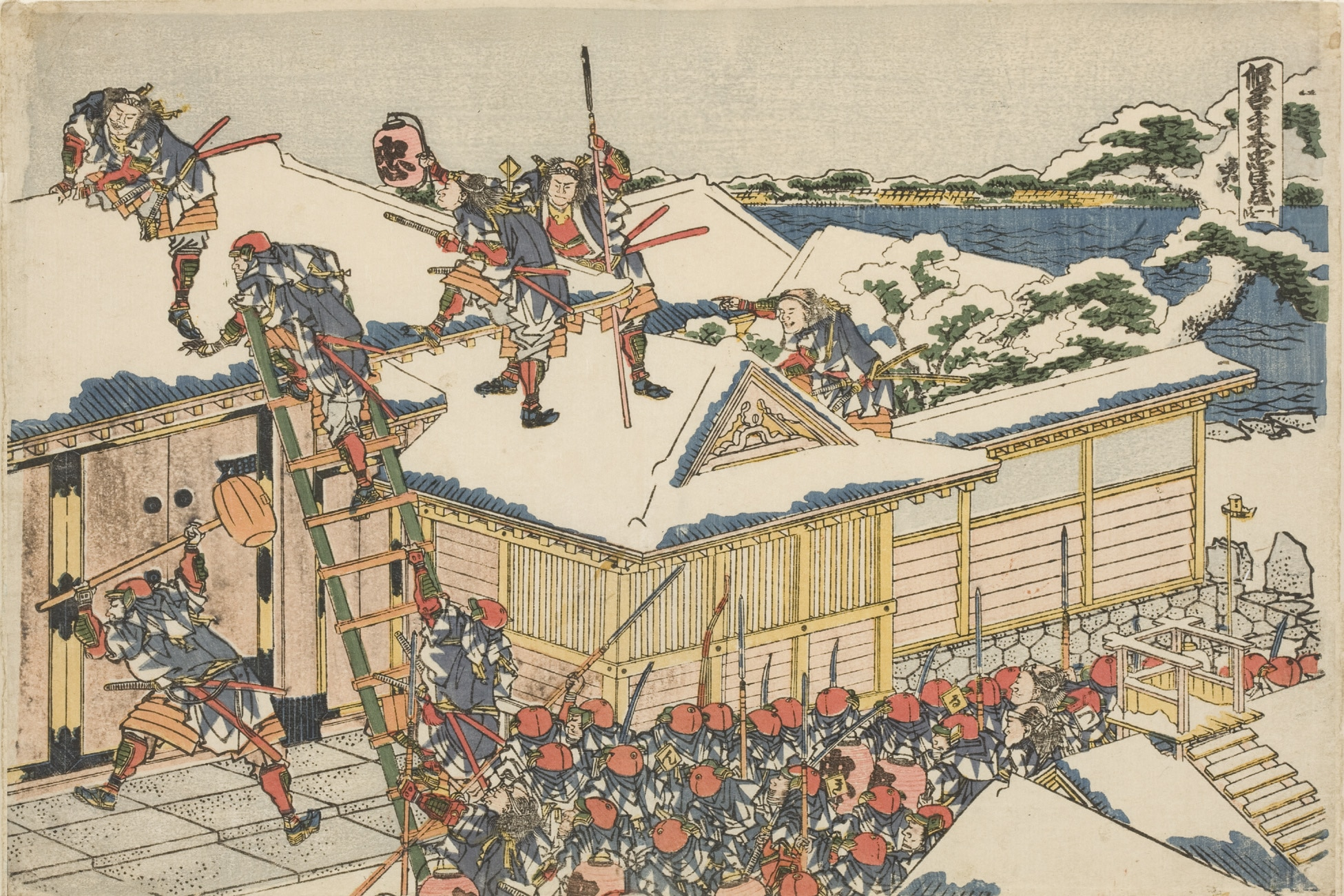
Hokusai's painting of the 47 ronin storming Kira Yoshinaka's mansion

In the early 1700s, Lord Kira Yoshinaka, who lived in Ryogoku next to the Sumida River, was appointed to teach Lord Asano Naganori about court ritual. Yoshinaka disliked this appointment, and did not receive some entitled gifts from the government. He provoked Naganori until he pulled out his dagger and struck Yoshinaka. This was punishable by death, and Naganori had to commit seppuku (ritual self-disembowelment). His family was disinherited, becoming ronin, and their estates were divided up. His elder councilor, Oishi Koranosuke, planned his revenge on Yoshinaka with 46 other former Asano retainers. On 30 January 1703, the 47 ronin stormed Yoshinaka's mansion. They gave him the chance to commit seppuku. He refused, so Koranosuke beheaded him with Naganori's sword. The head was then brought to the Sengaku-ji temple and placed before Naganori's grave. The government ordered the ronin to commit seppuku, which they did on 4 February. The incident became an element of popular culture.

=== Laws ===
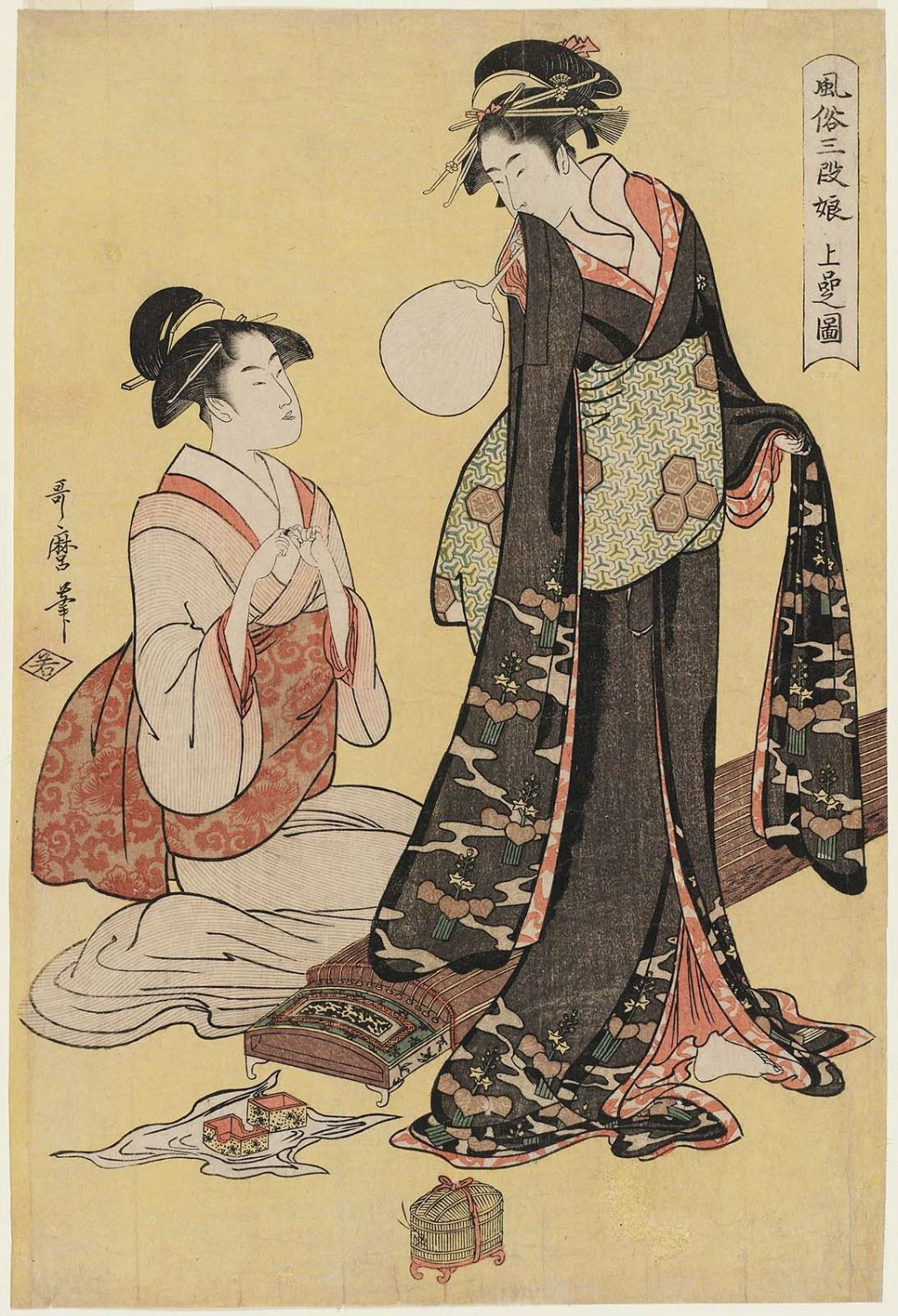
Picture of the Upper Class, a c. 1794–1795 painting by Utamaro. The woman on the left is lower in class than the woman on the right, who wears more colorful clothes.

Edo neo-Confucianism was a popular philosophy, which partially came from the theory of Hayashi Razan, a lecturer at Yushima's Shoheizaka Institute of Learning. It focused less on Confucianism's metaphysical aspects, and more of how people should obey the state. It dictated many aspects of how people lived, moreso the lower-class. For example, higher-class people were allowed to wear colorful clothes, while lower-class people wore muted tones, to "promote their invisibility". Merchants were banned from living in two-story homes, and were moved to newly constructed mezzanine units. The lower-class were banned from owning certain luxury items. The ruling class pretended to have merchant-class wealth to suppress dissent, the merchant class pretended to have lower-class wealth to avoid punishment, and the lower classes ignored their restrictions as rebellion.

Some freedoms were afforded to Edo's lower classes not afforded in other big cities. One example is how a person absent from the Census Register could live as a laborer in Edo, fitting in with outcasts. Class-based social structure started to break down by the mid-century. It was then possible for a lower-class samurai to marry a merchant-class woman.

The city then had two types of land ownership: bukechi and chochi. Bukechi, the samurai system, was used for residential property. Sales and purchases were not allowed, so the value of a parcel of land was indeterminable. Chochi was the system used by merchants and craftsmen for both residential and commercial purposes. Chochi recognized private ownership, so land had a known value. Regarding administration, here was no central authority in Tokyo, but rather a complex system of local districts. Decision-making in each district was headed by two men, machi bugyo. They issued orders to the next level of three full-time hereditary administrators, called toshiyori.

=== Disasters ===
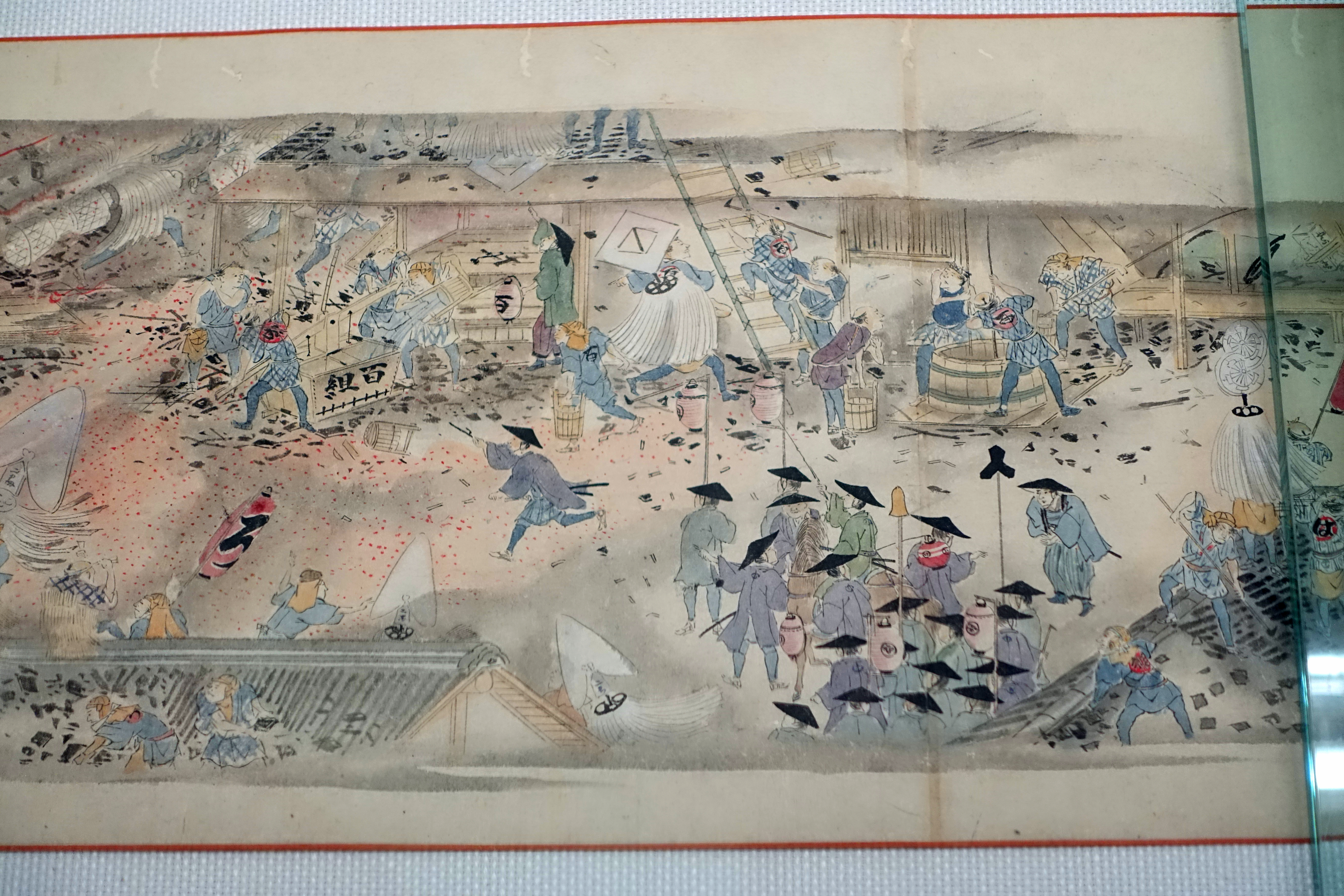
An 1869 picture scroll of the 1772 Great Meiwa Fire

In 1703, there was an earthquake and fire in the city. A year later, there was flooding which led to disease outbreaks. In 1707, Mount Fuji erupted. The ash made it hard to see, so people used lanterns to move around. They protected themselves from embers by wearing wet cloths. Those in the shitamachi found it "almost impossible" to evacuate. Other were able to go to religious sites to pray for divine intervention. In the year 1742, 4,000 died from storms and floods. In 1772, the Great Meiwa Fire killed an estimated 6,000. In 1791, typhoons and high tides destroyed the Fukugawa red light district.

The city alternated between food abundance and scarcity. The lower classes rioted whenever rice was unavailable, and broke into rice granaries. A riot in the 1780s started after Nagano's Mount Asama erupted, which brought thousands of peasants into Edo. Starvation drove many people in Edo to commit suicide. During the Tempo era of 1830 to 1844, there was a distribution of emergency rice stock, which averted greater disorder.

=== Art and entertainment ===
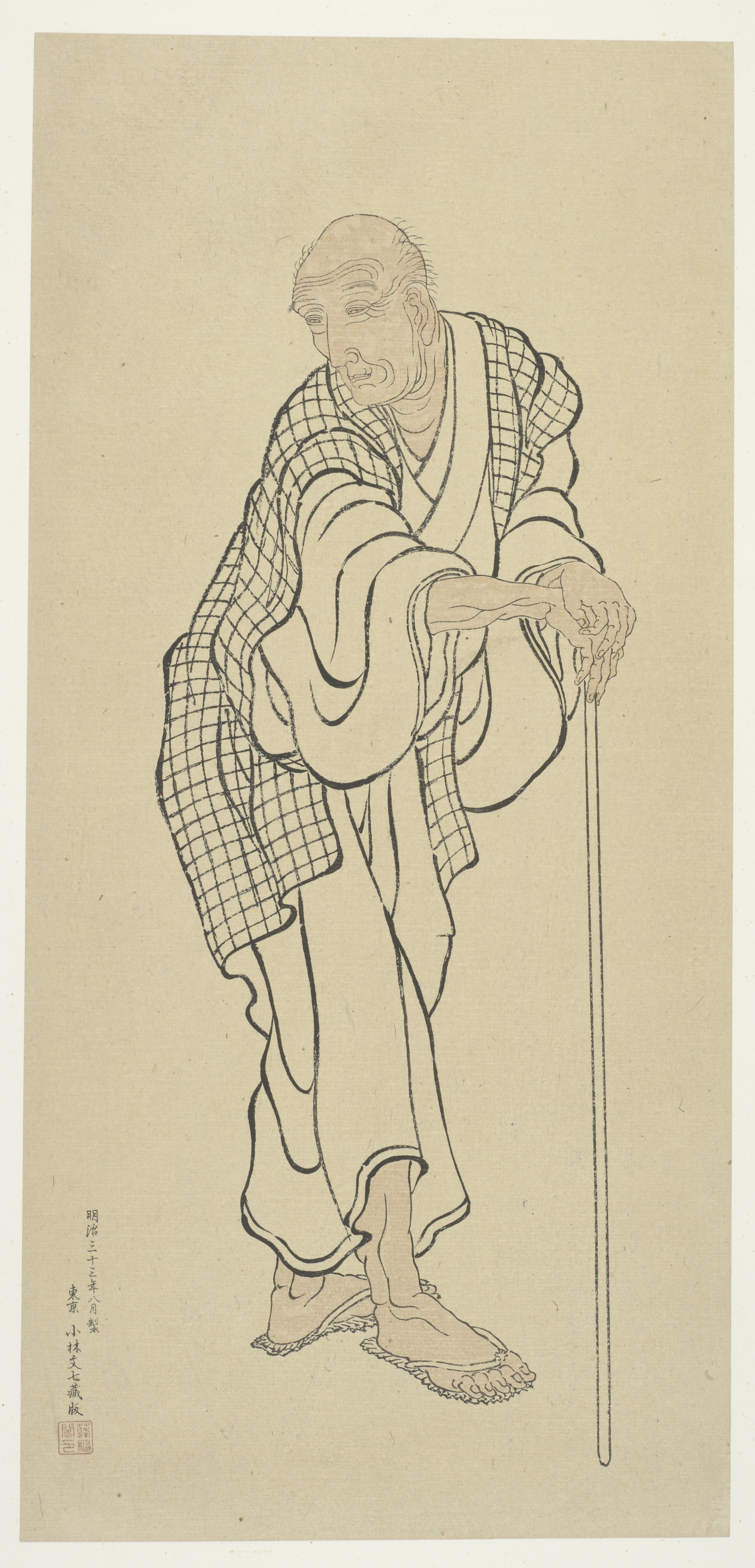
Katsushika Hokusai

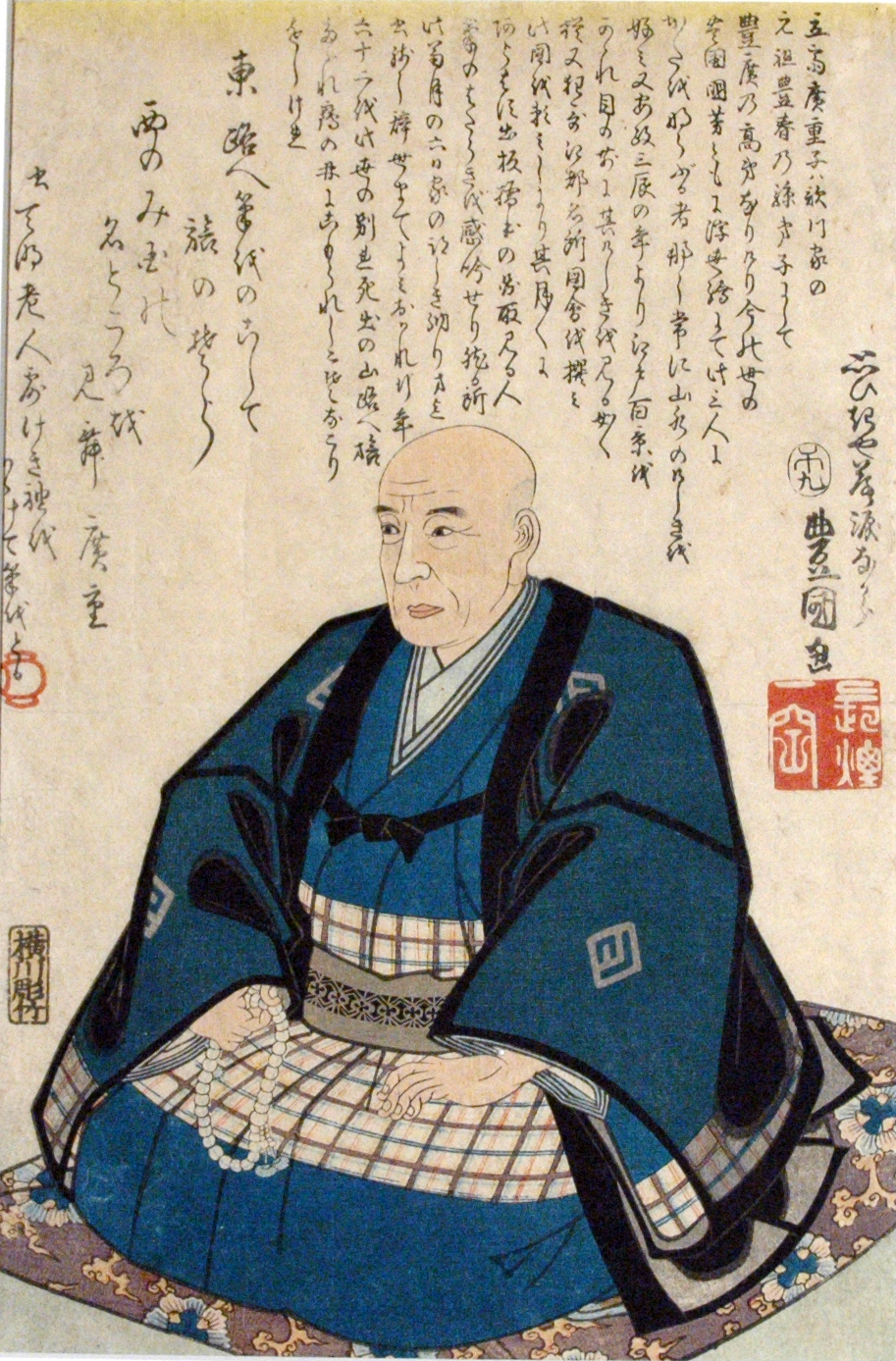
Utagawa Hiroshige

One notable book was the Confucian text Kogiroku (Record of Filial piety and Ethical Righteousness), and a notable genre was kibyoshi, adult comic books written mostly in hiragana. Laws like the Kansai reforms censored certain books and disallowed commoners from writing fiction.

Famous paintings of Edo by artists like Hokusai, Hiroshige, and Kuniyoshi were made in the 18th and 19th centuries. Hokusai painted landscapes, as well as the erotic shunga (spring pictures). Various artists at the time criticized city society with their works. These included theater performers, the writer Napa Oto, popular novels with satirical prose called sen-ryu, and painters like Hokusai.

An annual celebration was the Festival of the River God, at the Sumidagawa Shrine by the Sumida's east bank. Near the end of May, a fireworks display known as kawa-biraki (river opening) was held on the river, initially intended somehow to cleanse the city of cholera.

== Tokugawa period, 1800–1868 ==
At Mukojima, on the Sumida's east bank, "private gardens, teahouses and temples" were visited by the era's leading artists, including Kameda Hosai, Sakai Hoitsu, and Tani Buncho. They also visited Sahara Kiky's Mukojima's Hyakka-en garden. Kiku and his artist friends, made a garden that associated itself with Japanese and Chinese literature. They enscribed stones that can still be read. By the end of the century, Mukojima would be packed with factories which ruined the local plants and water.

City officials tried to combat the defiance of class-based social structure. The Tenpo Reforms were issued multiple times over to arrest non-compliant "writers, reformists, and liberal political figures". They banned many things, including displays of luxury, and female musicians and headdressers. The number of variety halls was reduced from over 500 to 15.

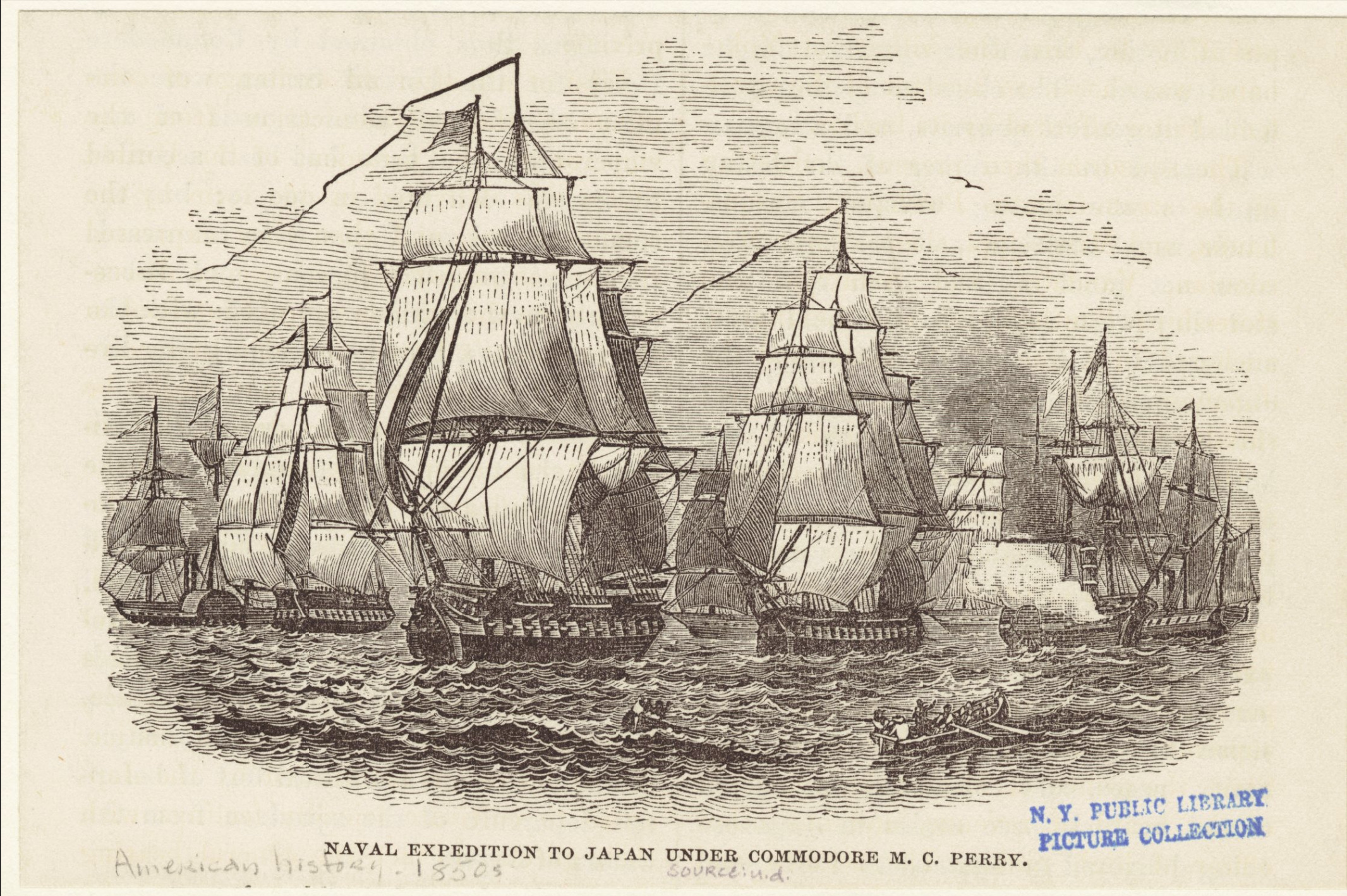
Commodore Matthew C. Perry's fleet during his second visit to Tokyo in 1854

=== Perry Expedition and the opening of Japan ===
On 8 July 1853, American Commodore Matthew C. Perry and his four steam-powered metal ships sailed into Edo Bay, and demanded Japan open their port for trade. Japan responded with fear. In Ukiyo-e portraits, Americans were karasu-tengu (crow goblins). Nonetheless, Perry convinced them by presenting American goods like the telegraph and sewing machines, and the Japanese responded by showed the Americans good like lacquer boxes and teapots. After Perry visited again in 1854, the shogun opened Japan to foreigners, and give American control of Japanese tariffs to Western countries.

The opening led to instability throughout the country. Mobs and "cultish" groups formed in Edo, causing unrest. In 1866, a sudden increase in rice prices caused riots. Rice was distributed to the people, but it did not stop yaonoshi ("reform the world") beliefs, which theorized a systematic attempt by outsiders to destroy Japan. To combat more Western influence, guns and odaiba forts were built at Edo Bay. In 1858, the Unequal Treaties were signed, which allowed the America, Britain, France, the Netherlands, and Russia, to be able to trade at Japanese ports. In 1859, Townsend Harris opened an American consulate at Hiro-o's Zenpuku-ji temple, which was burned to the ground by imperialists who wanted to restore the monarchy's power. In 1861, the British consulate was attacked, and two years later, it was blown up.

=== Disasters ===
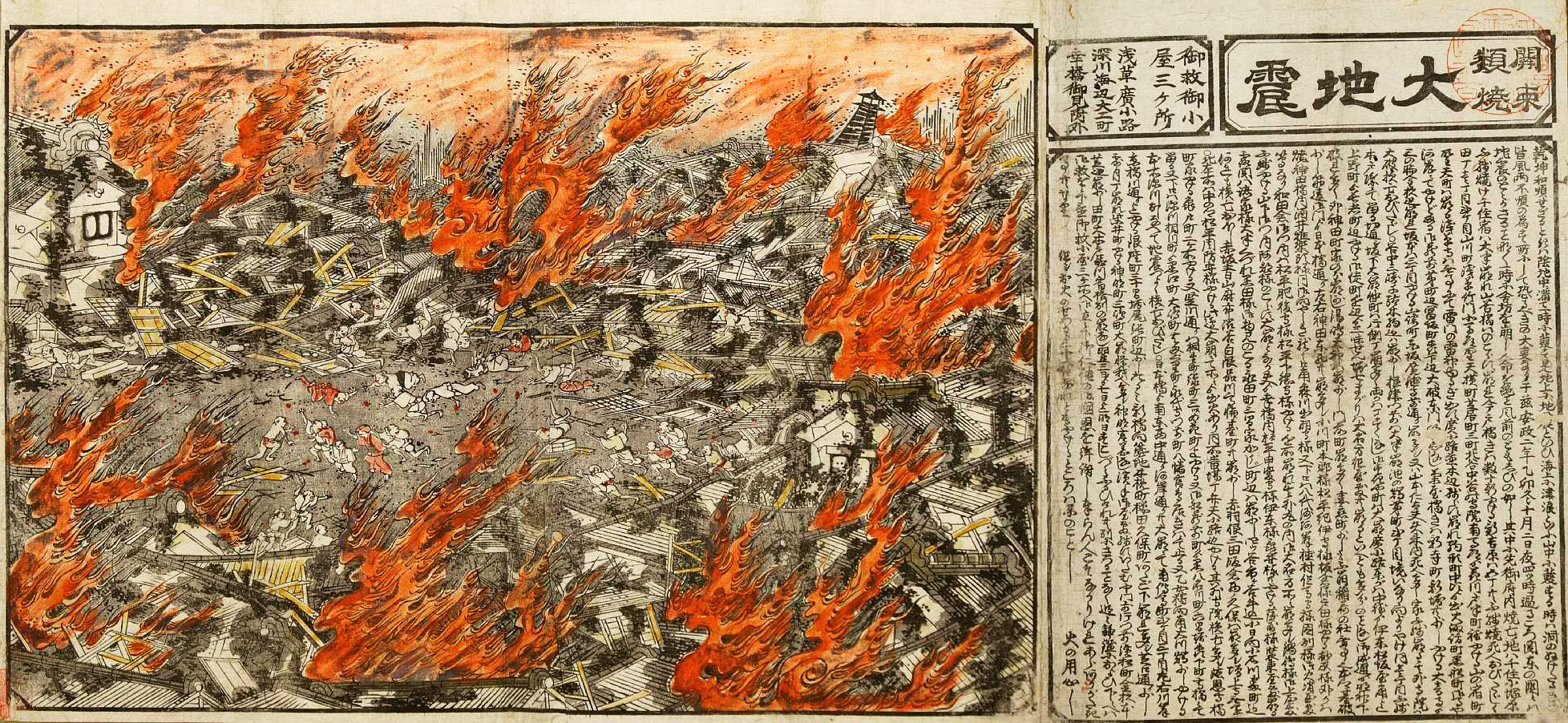
A kawaraban (news broadsheet) depicting the damage of the 1855 earthquake

A tidal wave in 1854 destroyed most Fukugawa homes. There were two major earthquakes in 1854 and 1855; the 1855 earthquake's magnitude was 6.9 to 7.0M. There was significant damage, mostly at wealthier areas. "Daimyo Lane", near Edo Castle and containing major fudai daimyō mansions and government buildings, was severely damaged. Also damaged was Yoshiwara, and the recently built bayside guns (a sign of the shogun's power). Deaths were from 8,000 to 10,000. Government relief to the city's laborers was fast and generous, which art portrayed as a redistribution of wealth from the city's wealthy to the city's laborers. Because Yoshiwara was destroyed, the bakufu allowed to construction of brothels across Edo. Fear there would be more disasters led to popularity of talismans, and namazu-e woodblock prints which featured catfish and were commentaries on the fear.

=== Fall of the Tokugawa Shogunate ===
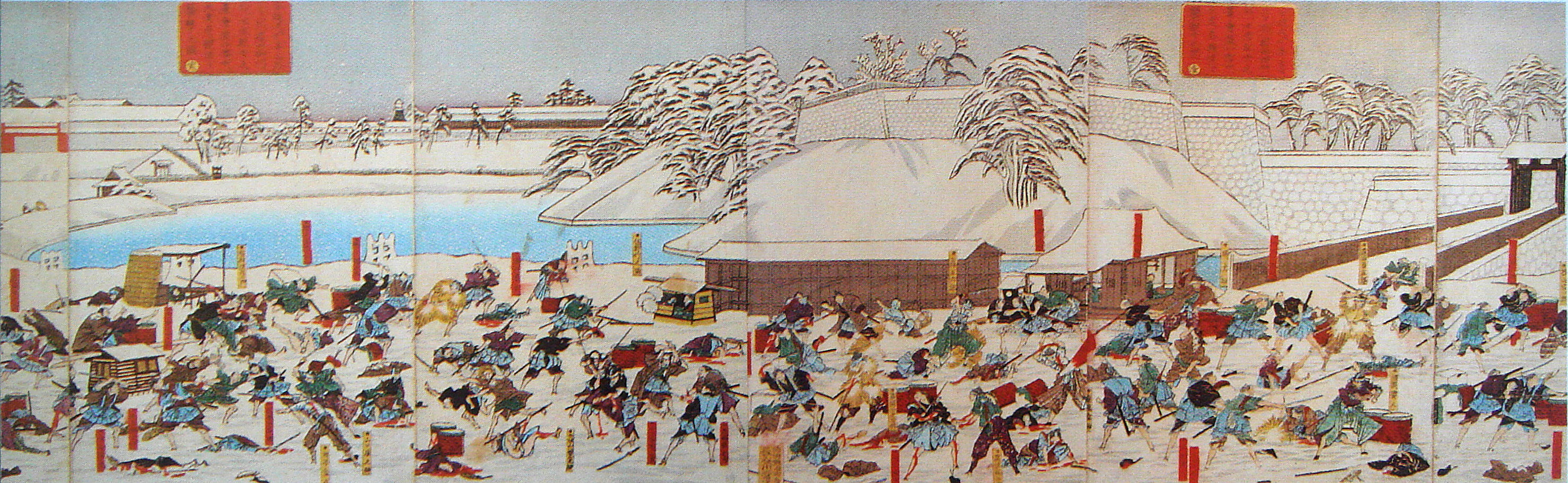
The Sakuradamon Incident (1860)

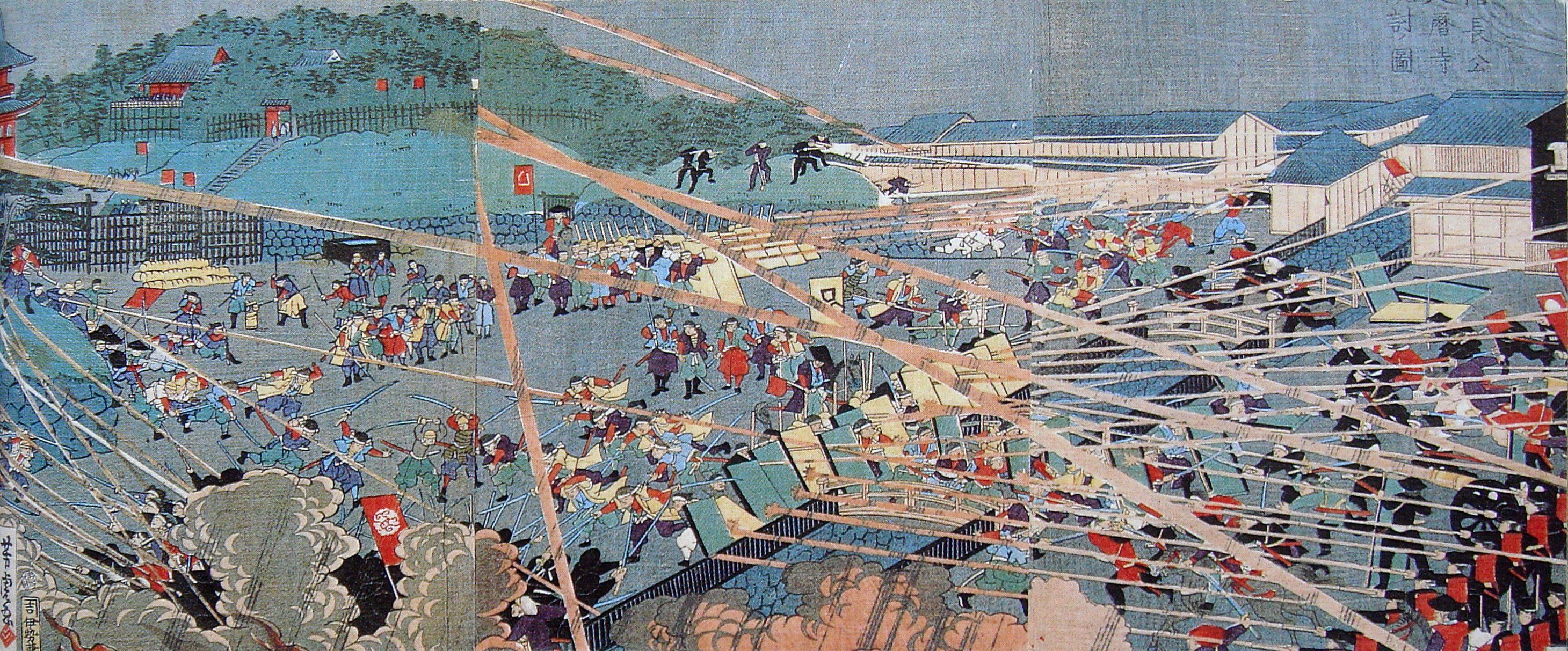
The Battle of Ueno in 1868

On 24 March 1860, rōnin samurai of Mito and Satsuma assassinated Ii Naosuke, Tairō (Chief Minister) of the shogunate. He was beheaded outside the Sakurada Gate of Edo Castle. Ii had favored the opening of Japan, and signed the Unequal Treaties. This outraged many daimyo, and Ii silencing them caused the assassination. His death led to instability in the shogunate.

Tokugawa Yoshinobu became shogun in 1866. He attempted to get French military aid by surrendering his powers, expecting he would be present in a new Western-influenced power structure. On 3 January 1868, middle- and lower-ranking samurai from Chōshū, Satsuma, and Tosa seized the palace in Kyoto and declared an Imperial restoration, ending the shogunate. Yoshinobu accepted the coup, but his advisers did not, which created a small civil war. Imperial forces marched to Edo, and Yoshinobu told his troops to surrender to the coup. Despite this peaceful negotiation, at Ueno Hill, Shogitai Tokugawa loyalists held a final stand against soldiers siding with the emperor. The Shogitati were massacred, mostly near the Kuromon (Black Gate). The Kanei-ji temple, a symbol of the shogunate, was burned.

== Meiji era (1868–1912) ==
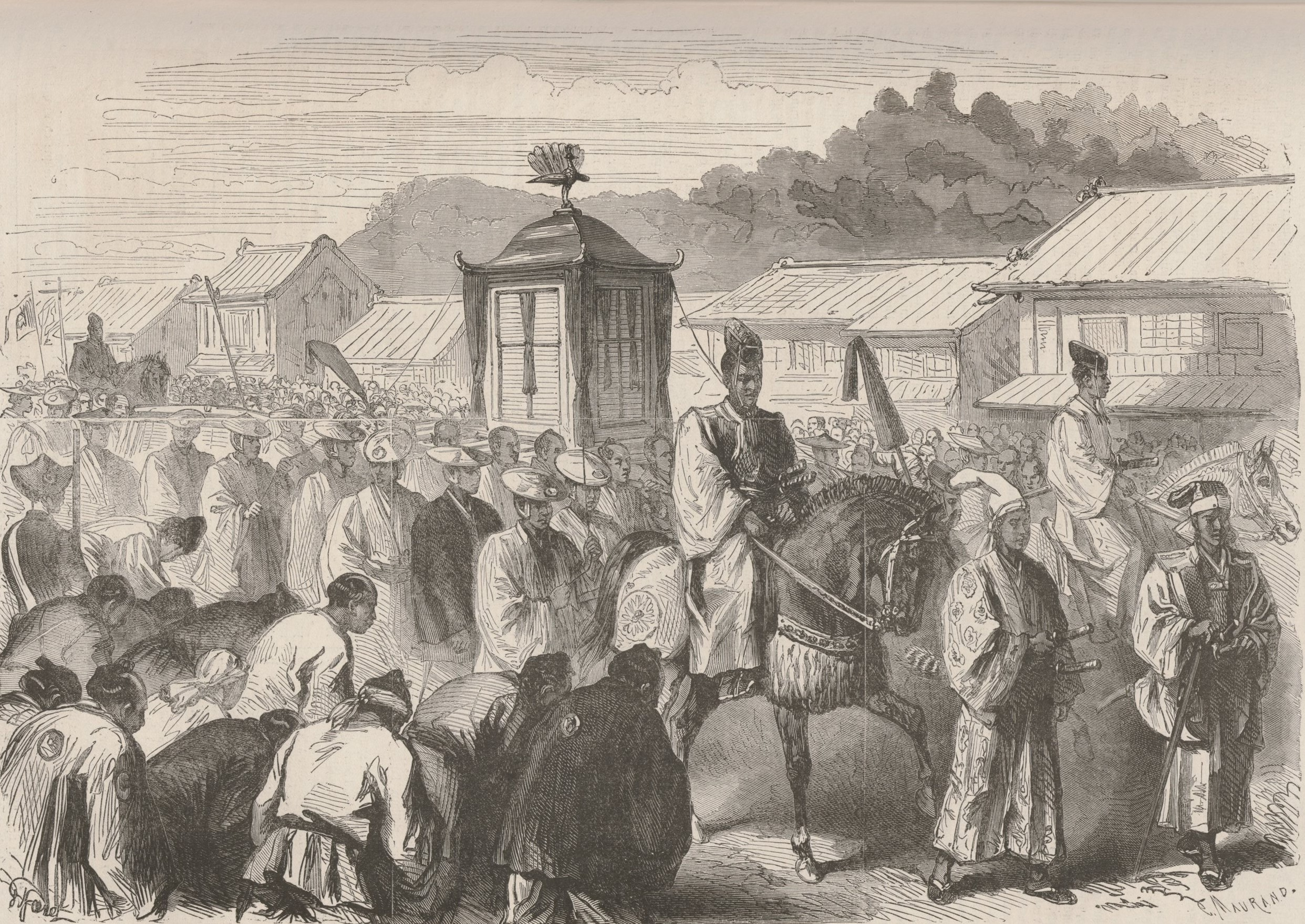
Emperor Meiji, moving from Kyoto to Tokyo after the fall of Edo in 1868

Emperor Meiji was brought from Kyoto to lead the Meiji Restoration, which formed a new imperial government. In practice, he answered to reformist politicians like Ito Hirobumi and Okubo Toshimichi. Japan had to decide how much tradition would carry over to a modernizing country. Edo was renamed Tokyo in July 1868, and Edo Castle became Tokyo Castle. The emperor moved there in 1869. Samurai were abolished, and they became servants. Meiji made government officials wear Western-style clothing in public. Buddhist ceremonies were removed from the palace. In 1874, the Tokyo Metropolitan Police Department was established. The poor played little role in the upheaval, but their cynical commentary on the transition appeared in writing.

Historical population
Year	Pop.	±%
1870	590,268	—
1880	712,259	+20.7%
1890	1,389,684	+95.1%
1900	1,580,124	+13.7%
1910	2,202,079	+39.4%

Artistocratic estates were turned into government buildings. Kanda Left Gate, a declining area of daimyo estates, was destroyed in an 1869 fire. The city tried to ward off future fires by placing the Akiba Jinja (Autumn Leaf Shrine) there. This led to the area being named Akihabara (Plain of Autumn Leaves).

In Meiji's first few years, 50 to 60,000 shosei students, young and poor men, arrived in Tokyo, and many worked as servants to pay for school. Sankin-kōtai ended, so daimyo, their assistants, and other workers left the city, an estimated 360,000 people. This, and the warfare surrounding the Restoration, brought the population down from 1.3 million in the early 19th century to about 500,000 in 1869. In the 1880s, there was a demographic resurgence from former samurai returning to Tokyo to work as servants, patrolmen, and teachers. New developments were made to house the peasants moving in from the countryside. The population reached two million in 1905.

In 1877, Saigo Takamori, a leader of the shogunate's overthrow, tried to overthrow the Meiji government he considered weak. His army left for Tokyo from a city on the island of Kyushu, but they were stopped before they could leave the island. He lost the ensuing war.

In 1878, the city was consolidated into 15 wards, which extended beyond the actual city into farmland.

=== Meiji development ===
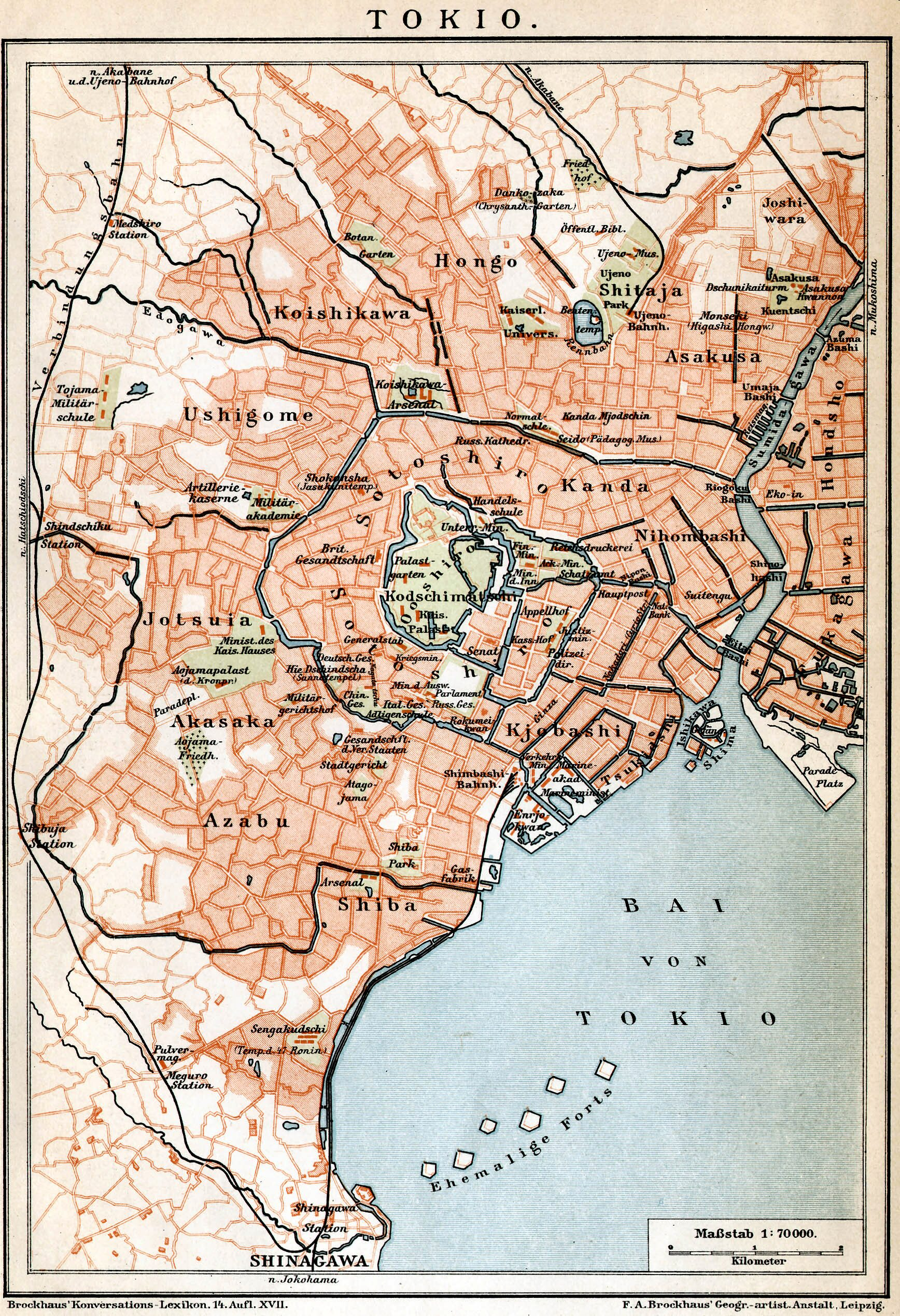
A German map of Tokyo from 1896

==== Urban planning ====
In the 1870s, the Meiji reformers dissolved the bukechi system, putting bukechi land under the chochi rules and thereby ending a large class division.

In 1869 to 1871, officials experimented with the Fifty-Ward System to end the control of machi bugyo and toshiyori. In 1871, the feudal domain system was replaced by a prefectural system, and Tokyo Prefecture was established out of parts of former Musashi Province. The Large and Small Ward System gave officials control over local decisions. Beautification and improving the infrastructure and services were emphasized. City planners spoke the language of progress. Japan's new commitment to modernization transformed older notions of cities and city planning practices. The first Meiji decades revealed a lack of elite consensus about the proper path to modernity, but there was ultimately a marriage of the political motivations of the country's leaders with the modern urban needs for improved transportation networks and zoning mechanisms. Public opinion also mattered, and had a certain impact on how the planners put their theories and practice. Oyatoi-gaikokujin (foreign experts) were also used as advisors.

==== Westernization ====
Elements of Western architecture were inserted into most Meiji architecture, first at the Tsukiji foreign settlement. It was the designated living space for foreigners in Edo, and contained Keio Gijuku, a school for Western studies created by Fukuzawa Yukichi. Yukichi would influence the Japanese government to become an "imperial power exercising regional hegemony at the expense of its subject peoples". The Edo Hotel opened there in 1868. It was mostly Japanese-style, but had European and British Raj architectural influence. Many buildings of the time were shrunken to fit limited spaces, which gave them a "toy model appearance". Many foreigners left Tsukiji for Yokohama after the Ginza fire of 1872, leaving mostly Japanese consulate employees. After 1899, foreigners could live wherever they wanted. The foreigners at Tsukiji helped construct multiple schools that later evolved into universities in the area: Aoyama, Joshi, Meiji Gakuin, and Rikkyo, among others.

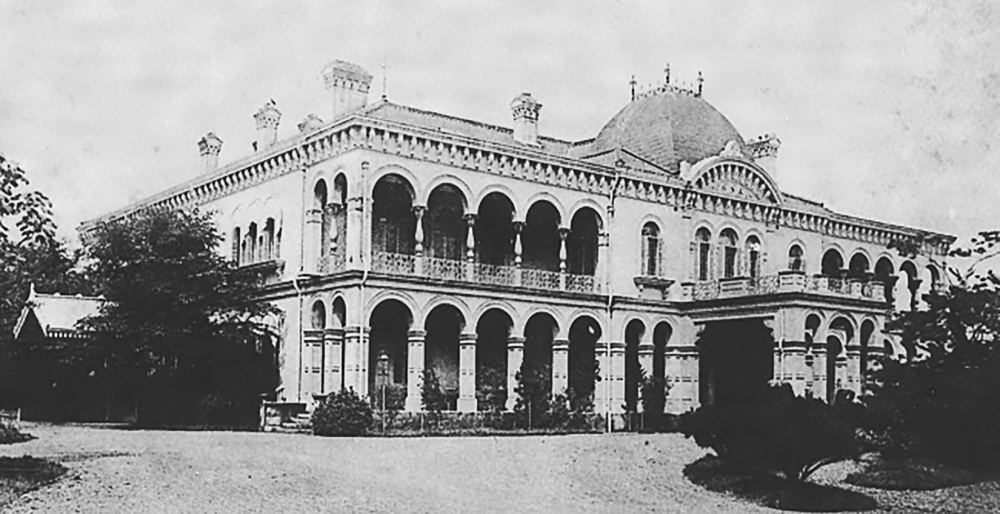
Rokumeikan, a club mixing Japanese and European styles

Two of the important Western architects in the city were Charles de Boinville, who made the Engineering College, and Josiah Conder, who made the hotel Rokumeikan, Nikolai Cathedral, and London Block, the new headquarters of Mitsubishi. The Ryounkako was a shopping and entertainment center in Asakusa from 1890 until its destruction during the Great Kanto Earthquake. Designed by Scottish civil engineer W.K. Burton, it was considered Tokyo's first skyscraper at 12 stories, and had Japan's first elevators.

Modeled after European cities, Tokyo was made repository of cultural treasures from across Japan. For example, the Tokyo National Museum displayed representative items from the Horyu-ji temple in Nara Prefecture. Museum creator Machida Hisanari used it to promote the monarchy.

Western standards also influenced two notable parks: a hill in the northern district was used for celebrations, and a parade ground next to the palace was turned into a recreational space. They were models for other parks around the city. In 1882, Ueno Zoo opened.

The Mitsui family's Mitsukoshi store took inspiration from American store Wanamaker's by promoting seasonal exhibitions. It inspired the stores Shirokiya and Takashimaya, which opened in Ginza and Kyobashi, making those districts major retailing areas.

==== Modernization ====
In 1869, telegraph lines between Shinbashi and Yokohama started operating. A telephone service started in 1877, and telephone-exchange operators were the first working women in the country. The Tokyo Stock Exchange opened in Kabutocho in 1878. A new port was constructed in 1880.

In 1872, a rail line opened between Shinagawa and Yokohama, which was an important innovation in a city mostly using horse-drawn carriages. 60 to 100,000 people were present at its opening ceremony. The line was extended to Shinbashi later that year. In 1885, the first section of what was to become the Yamanote railway line opened between Akabane and Shinagawa Stations. In 1902, as the railway reached the site of Azuma Bridge, the area around it named itself Asakusa to associate it with the local Asakusa entertainment district. Ikebukuro Station opened on the Yamanote Line in 1903. In 1903, the first tram lines opened.

In 1872, the castle at the Army Headquarters complex caught on fire, and spread eastward, destroying thousands of buildings in Ginza. They used the rebuilding as an opportunity to modernize and westernize, which was important as it was located between Nihonbashi and the rail depot, Shinbashi. It eventually had "gas lamps, paved sidewalks, willow trees, and telegraph poles", and was the home of the Ginza Black Quarter, a thousand buildings between Ginza and Kyobashi designed by architect Thomas Walters to deter fires. However, poor ventilation meant the area was unbearable during summer heat. Many people left, returning once the government offered them subsidies. Ginza became home to geisha houses (66 by 1912) and offices of the newspapers Tokyo Nichi Nichi Shimbun and Yubin Hochi Shinbun, who were advocates for democracy and criticized the government.

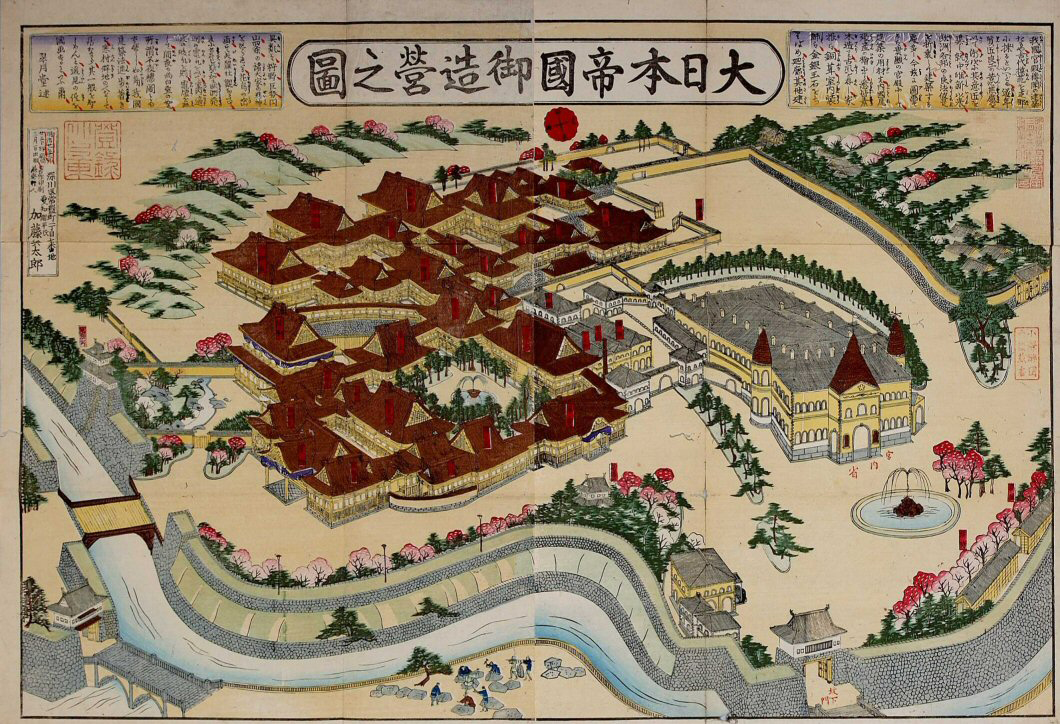
A painting of the new Tokyo Imperial Palace

The new Imperial Palace was completed in 1889, which notably was in a classical Japanese style. The site was made up of wooden pavilions linked by covered passages and broken up by courtyard gardens. The emperor's residence was the first place in Japan to have electric light. The Meiji emperor built a grand image for himself. He would often appear to the public wearing a field marshal outfit. Worshipping him was mandated (a part of increasing Japanese nationalism), and at Shinto shrines, people listened to rites that linked his ancestors to the Son of Heaven.

In 1897, the opening of freight wards in Sumida meant lodgings for its workers needed to be built. This led to the creation of the Sanya doya-gai slums, the most famous slums in Tokyo.

=== Education ===
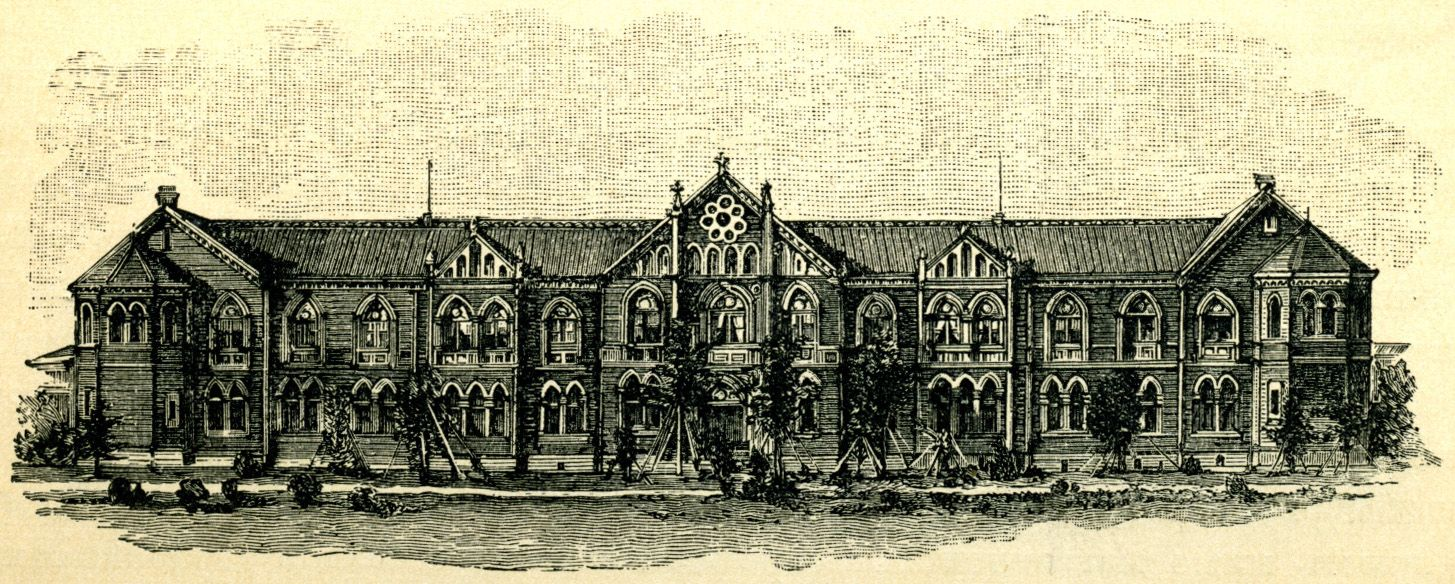
Tokyo Imperial University's law building before 1902

Tight control over education was exercised by the Ministry of Education. In 1877, multiple government schools were merged into the University of Tokyo, which led in Western-style study of science and technology. Consultants were brought in from Europe and the U.S. Kikuchi Dairoku, a mathematician educated in Britain, became president. By the 1880s, the university also became a political instrument of the government bureaucracy. Its scholars began to enter public debate as experts in many areas. Study of law developed rapidly at the school, and many of its alumni became bureaucrats. Tokyo Vocational School, which later became the Tokyo Institute of Technology, opened in 1881.

=== Art and entertainment ===
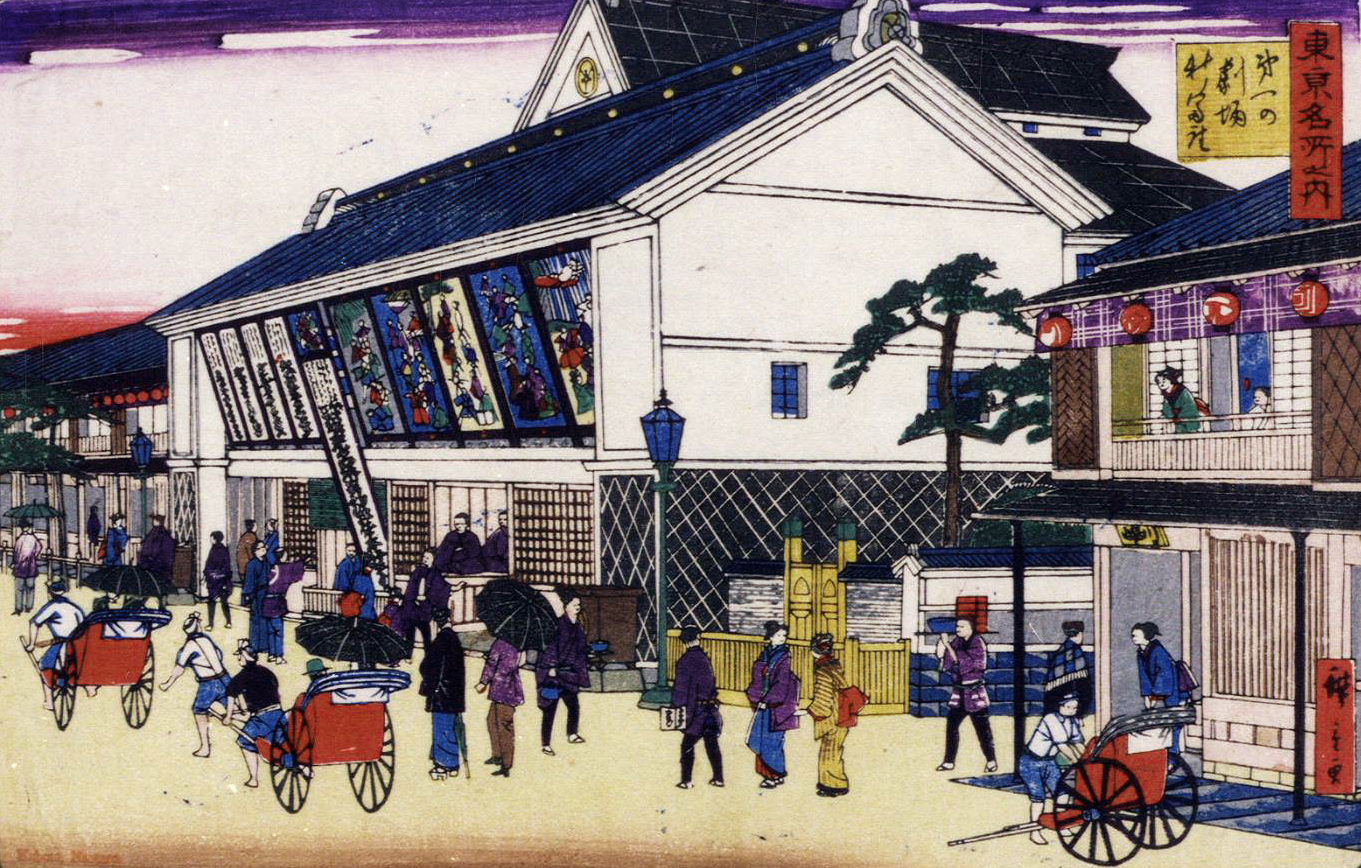
The Shintomi-za theater, as painted by Utagawa Hiroshige III in 1881

Two notable painters of the time were Utagawa Kuniteru II and Hiroshige III. Many Western writers became popular. Maruzen, a top bookstore, sold titles in Japanese and foreign languages when it opened in Nihonbashi in 1869. Noh plays were revived in this time, and many Noh theaters were constructed. Kabuki performers wanted more respect for the artform, so it was relocated to prestigious districts. It was reformed, partially by the Society for Theatre Reform, and was viewed by Meiji and U.S. president Ulysses S. Grant. A notable performer was Ichikawa Danjuro IX, who wanted to 'sanitize' the artform. The government allowed women to be theater performers in 1877; they created gidayu, musical theater involving puppetry. Authorities worried gidayu corrupted men, and banned them from viewing it in 1900. Shorin Hakuen and Henry James Black were notable kodanshi (narrative storytellers). Many clubs started in Meiji-era Tokyo, home to many different trades and demographics.

=== Hibiya incendiary incident ===
The Hibiya incendiary incident of 1905 started in response to Japan's negotiations with Russia after Japan won the Russo-Japanese War. Concessions were made to Russia, including giving them control of Sakhalin, the island Japan had taken during the war. Some Japanese people interpreted the negotiations as meaning Japanese people had died in the war for nothing. On 5 September, 30,000 protesters in Hibiya Park held a short rally, and nearby, 2,000 marched towards the Imperial Palace, causing damage and committing violence. Police were limited in their ability to control the riot, so the military had to stop it, after it had gone on for three days. By the end, 14 had died, 311 were arrested, and 70% of Tokyo's police boxes were destroyed. It intensified social unrest for the next decade.

== Taishō era (1912–1926) ==
Historical population
Year	Pop.	±%
1920	3,699,428	—
1925	4,485,144	+21.2%

Notable constructions from this were the Tokyo Station, Kyū-Furukawa Gardens, Meiji Shrine, and Daito Bunka University.

In 1918, there were riots in many parts of the city over the high price of rice, a part of the inflation caused by World War I.

In 1921, the Prime Minister of Japan, Takashi Hara, was assassinated. He made political parties a primary institution of Japan, and, notable to his death, wanted to reduce the military's size, and opposed the Japanese intervention in Siberia. On 4 November 1921, he was killed by a young rightist at Tokyo Station.

=== Disasters ===
The 1918 Spanish flu affected Tokyo by 2 February 1919.

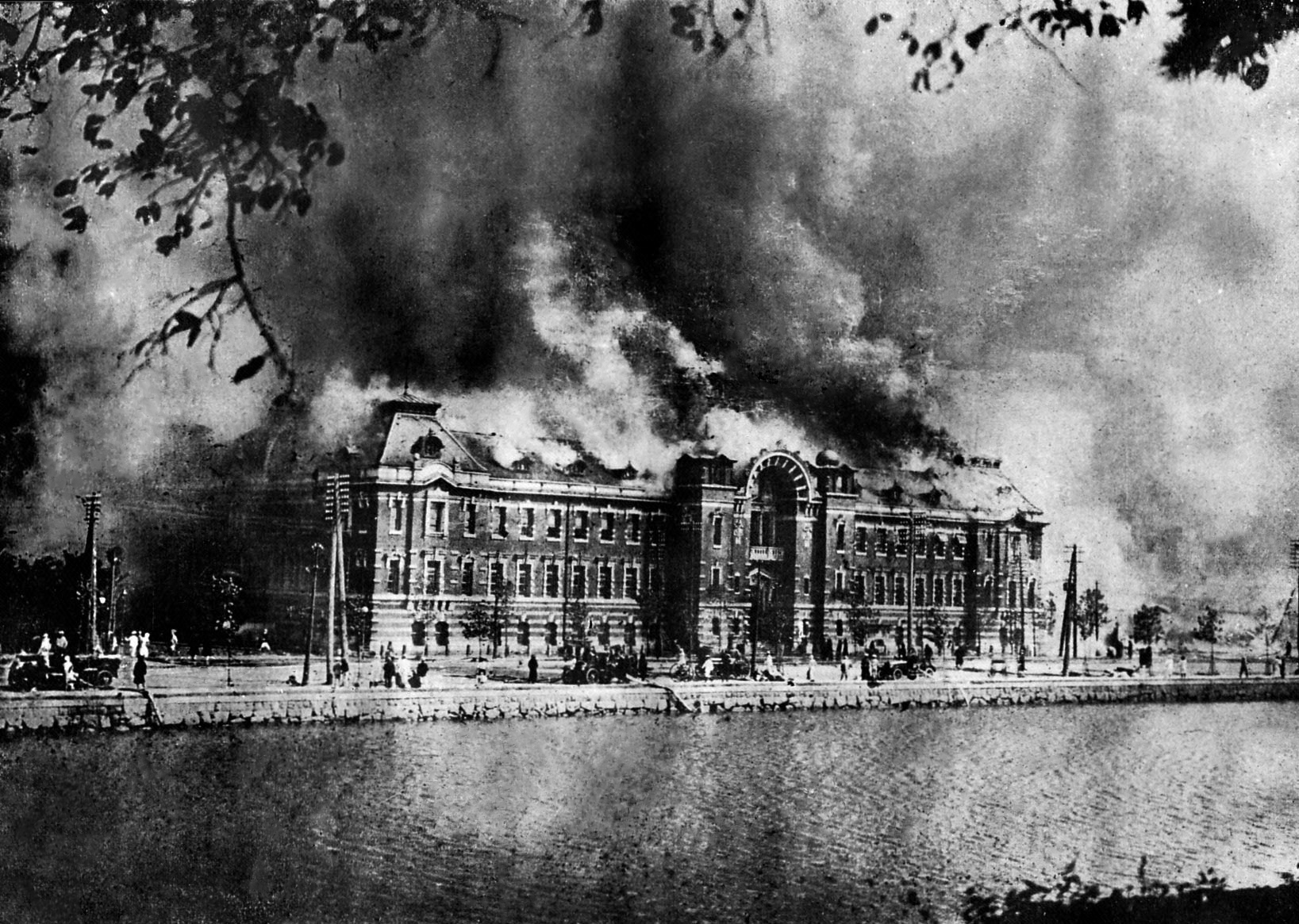
The Metropolitan Police Department burning at Marunouchi, near Hibiya Park during the 1923 earthquake

At noon on Saturday 1 September 1923, the Great Kanto earthquake registered 8.3 on the Richter scale. The epicenter was in Sagami Bay, about 80 km south of Tokyo. Minutes later came a tsunami, 12 meters tall. As fires swept across Tokyo, 75% of all buildings suffered severe structural damage. The quake cut most of the water mains. Of the population of 4.5 million, 2% to 3% were killed. Two million people were homeless. Two percent of Japan's total national wealth was destroyed. Nihonbashi, Ginza, and Marunouchi were some of the less devastated areas.

Angry survivors took blame and revenge on resident Koreans, killing several thousand out of hatred of Korean identity. The Japanese occupation of Korea influenced racial prejudice that led to the massacre. Japanese commentators interpreted the disaster as an act of divine punishment against the immoral and degenerate Japanese people. It led to the feeling that Japan needed to return to its traditional values. The earthquake created unsanitary conditions that caused increased rates in typhoid fever. During previous urbanization, traditional waste disposal methods in the northern and western districts of the city collapsed, and the earthquake exaggerated those conditions. This led to new antityphoid measures and infrastructure.

=== Post-earthquake history ===
On 27 December 1923, in the Toranomon incident, there was an attempted assassination of Crown Prince Hirohito, when shots were fired at this car.

Taishō died on 25 December 1926, and was succeeded by Hirohito.

== Early Shōwa era (1926–1945) ==
Historical population
Year	Pop.	±%
1930	5,408,678	—
1935	6,369,919	+17.8%
1940	7,354,971	+15.5%
1945	3,488,284	−52.6%

In 1930, the city held a ceremony celebrating their rebuilding from the earthquake. In 1932, the city limits grew, and the number of wards increased from 15 to 35.

=== Early Shōwa development ===
In 1920, the Tokyo Underground Railway Company was established, which would create the first line of the Tokyo Metro rapid transit network in 1927, when its first subway line opened between Asakusa and Ueno. It was expanded in 1934 and named the Ginza Line in 1953. The Metro served 3 billion annual passengers in 2010. Metro operations would be operated by Tokyo Rapid Transit Authority starting in 1940, and then the Tokyo Metro Co. in 2004.

Notable buildings from this era were the Tokyo Metropolitan Art Museum, Toshimaen, National Diet Building, and Haneda Airfield. The dog Hachiko, who lived in Tokyo in the 1920s and 30s, became a part of Japanese popular culture and was immortalized as the Statue of Hachiko.

=== 1930s civil conflict ===
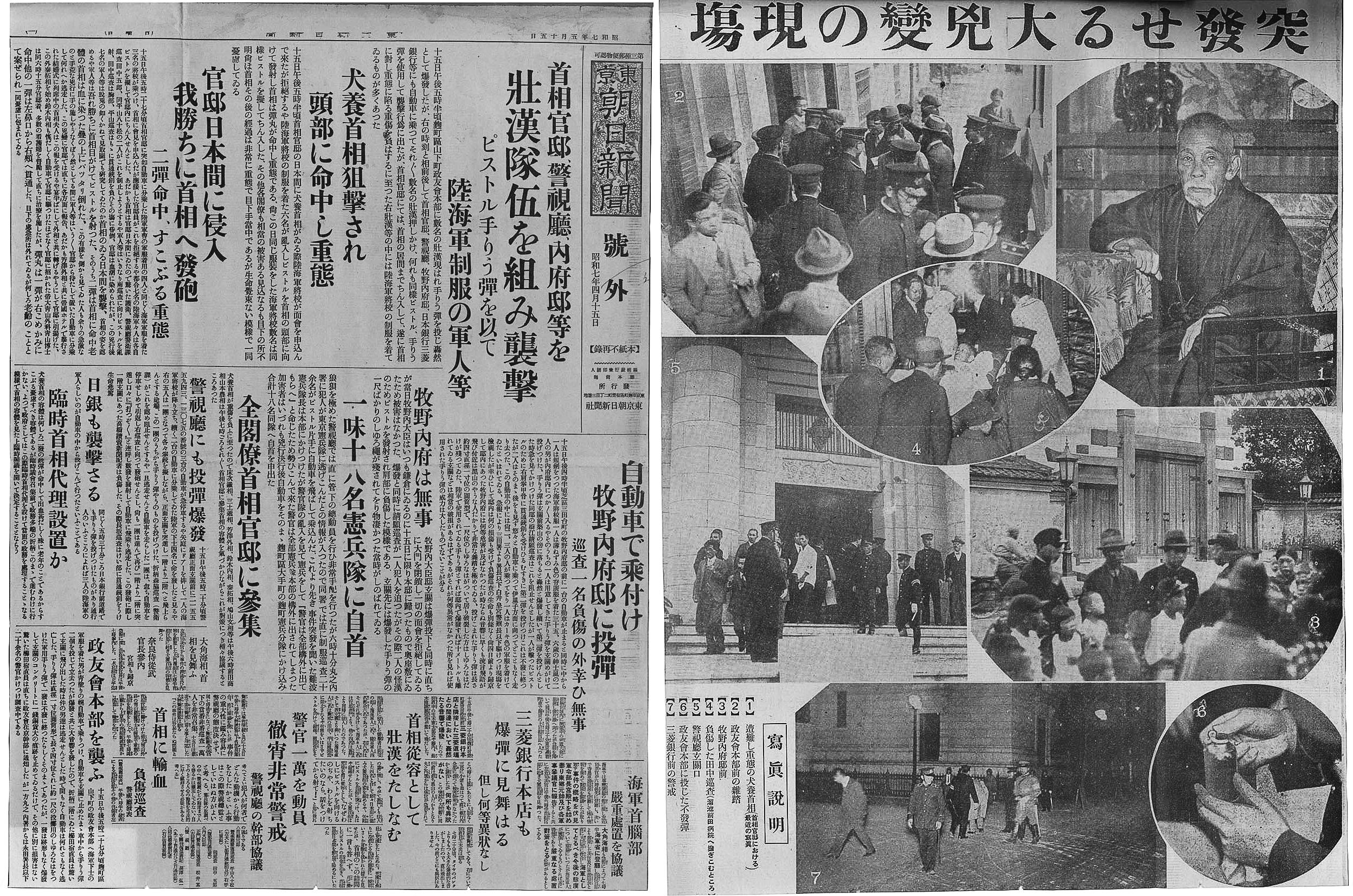
Tokyo's Asahi Shimbun in 1932 describing the May 15 incident and assassination of Prime Minister Inukai Tsuyoshi

A map of military rebels' initial attacks in the 1936 February 26 incident in downtown Tokyo

On 8 January 1932, in the Sakuradamon incident (1932), there was another attempted assassination on Hirohito, when a grenade was thrown at his car.

In 1931, the Japanese army invaded the Chinese province of Manchuria without approval of the Japanese cabinet in Tokyo, which was a major step towards the beginning of World War II. In December, Inukai Tsuyoshi became Prime Minister, and tried to stop the military from acting without the approval of the cabinet. He prepared to send a representative to meet with China and stop the conflict there, but he was assassinated by nationalist naval officers in Tokyo on 15 May 1932.

Afterwards, martial law was not declared, and the military said it would not accept a new cabinet. A new prime minister was suggested, retired Admiral Saitō Makoto, but the office went to Keisuke Okada in 1934. During Okada's reign, Tokyo University professor Minobe Tatsukichi popularized a theory that the emperor should be an organ of the state. Right-wing military members who believed in the emperor's ultimate blamed Okada for Tatsukichi's theory and censured him. On 26 February 1936, notable statesmen, including Makoto, were assassinated by military members about to leave for Manchuria. Keisuke Okada escaped, as the assassins mistakenly shot his brother-in-law. For three days, rebels held downtown Tokyo, before they were stopped on the 29th. Their ringleaders were arrested and executed. In the army, the young nationalist rebels who wanted both domestic and foreign policy changes were replaced by conservative generals and officers who only focused on foreign policy. Okada resigned, blaming himself for the troubles that occurred under his administration, but he continued as a politician who had a major influence on Japanese politics until the end of World War II. Tatsukichi was forced to resign, and his books were banned until the end of the war.

The surge of nationalism in the 30s bent popular culture towards nationalism, including the city's music industry promoting military anthems. By 1936, cafes, dance halls, and revues in Asakusa and Ginza were under surveillance by the government to stop potential insurrection. In 1940, the city closed down Tokyo dance halls and banned jazz performances. Most large cinemas were banned by 1944.

=== World War II ===
Japan went to war with China in the Second Sino-Japanese War in 1937, though it was undeclared until December 1941. That month, after the Japanese declaration of war on America and the attack on Pearl Harbor, the Second Sino-Japanese War was subsumed into World War II. Following Pearl Harbor, Japan expanded their invasion of Asia.

In 1943, the "city of Tokyo" as an administrative unit was dissolved, being subsumed within the larger Tokyo Metropolis, which includes western Tokyo.

==== Doolittle Raid ====
1943 U.S. newsreel about the Dolittle Raid

Tokyo became the first Japanese city to be bombed in World War II on 18 April 1942, in the Doolittle Raid. At the command of American general James H. Doolittle, 16 B-25 bombers from the U.S. aircraft carrier Hornet made a surprise attack on Tokyo that boosted Allied morale. At the time, the U.S. had been losing the Pacific War. The bombing did little physical damage, but it had an enormous psychological effect in America and Japan. Prior to the raid, the Japanese military had considered the possibility of strikes on mainland Japan; the raid forced them to grow their mainland defenses. The raid led to the 1942 Battle of Midway and Zhejiang-Jiangxi campaign.

The sensitive issue of how to defend the capital from air attack became a pressing concern for Tokyo. Japan told Tokyo's citizens to protect themselves, until devastating American firebombing raids showed that was impossible.

==== Greater East Asia Conference ====
In November 1943, Tokyo hosted the Greater East Asia Conference, where leaders from Japan's puppet governments from the Greater East Asia Co-Prosperity Sphere (Japan's conquered Asian and Pacific territories) discussed multiple topics. They were: cooperation to assure stability in the sphere, respecting the sovereignty and independence of the regions in the sphere, respecting each other's culture and traditions, cooperation for economic prosperity, and cooperation to have greater relations with countries in the rest of the world. Japan dominated discussion during the conference, and did not follow through with their resolutions.

==== Bombing of Tokyo and the Battle of Iwo Jima ====
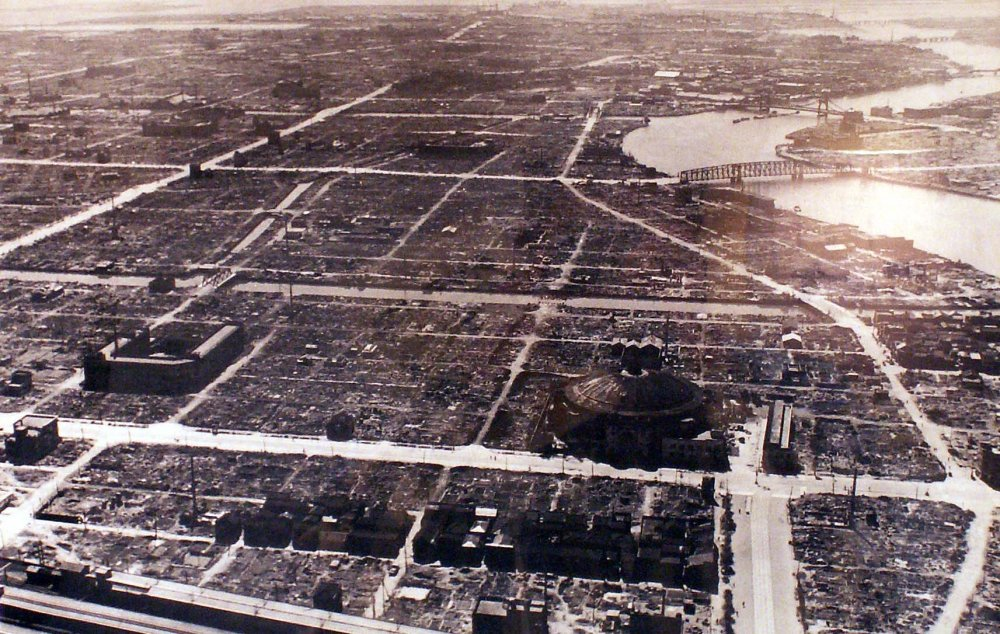
Tokyo from the air after the firebombing of the city, 1945

Tokyo was bombed repeatedly after November 1944, as the Americans opened air bases in the Mariana Islands that were in range. In January 1945, the U.S. Army Air Forces' Major General Curtis LeMay was tasked with revitalizing the bombing campaign. His boss, General "Hap" Arnold, urged him to stop precision bombing and adopt incendiary bombings.

On 19 February 1945, the U.S. stormed Iwo Jima, an island in Tokyo prefecture, and won the ensuing battle on 16 March. The battle killed 18,500 Japanese and 6,800 Americans. The U.S. used the island for two new airfields which would be important for the rest of the war.

During Operation Meethinghouse on 9–10 March 1945, LeMay sent pathfinder aircraft ahead of an armada of B-29 bombers to mark the target area in Tokyo with napalm bombs. The armada of 334 B-29s from the Mariana Islands followed. 279 of the bombers dropped 1,665 tons of incendiary bombs. Dry and windy conditions allowed an unstoppable conflagration to burn 45 square kilometers. Over 100,000 people were killed in minutes. Most of the victims suffocated in bomb shelters when the fires consumed their oxygen. One fourth of city's buildings were destroyed. U.S. military analysts found the operation did not deliberately target civilians, but civilians died because the Japanese often put military factories in residential areas to disguise them.

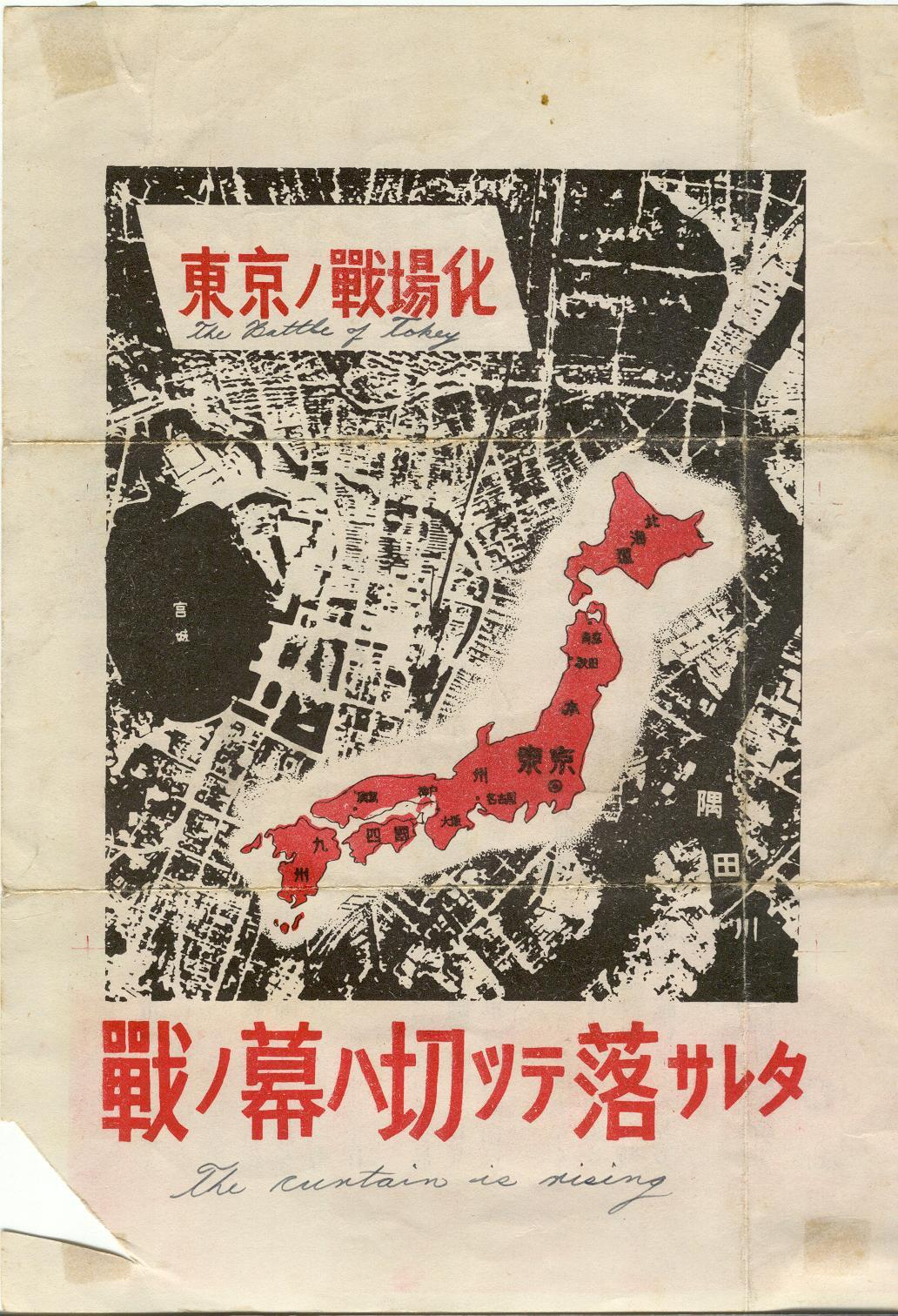
A leaflet dropped by the U.S. over Tokyo during the bombings, urging civilians to leave the city

After the raid, the strategy was to use area raids that used incendiary bombing to burn Japanese cities and kill the workers who kept the war machine going. Leaflets were dropped by the millions to order civilians to evacuate to the towns and rural areas which were not bombed. Half of Tokyo's 7.4 million residents fled. The strategy was similar to the air war against German cities and reflected prewar Air Force strategic planning, which focused on the burning of Tokyo and other industrial and command centers as a way to destroy the enemy's military capability. By the end of the firebombings, 60 percent of Tokyo had been on fire at some point. In 2002, the Center of the Tokyo Raids and War Damage museum was built.

==== Japan's surrender ====
On 6 and 9 August, respectively, America used atomic bombs on Hiroshima and Nagasaki, and the 8th, Soviet Union declared war on Japan. Japan agreed to sign the Potsdam Declaration's terms of surrender on 10 August, if their emperor was allowed to stay in power. America agreed to those terms, and Japan surrendered on the 14th. That day, there was an incident at the Imperial Palace, where conspirators tried to seize the recording of Hirohito's surrender message that would be broadcast to the country the following day. Two men were killed, and others killed themselves. Hirohito urged the Japanese people to accept the surrender. There was an unsuccessful attempt to assassinate Prime Minister Kantarō Suzuki on 2 September, during the surrender proceedings. Japan surrendered to China on 9 September.

== Post-war Shōwa era (1946–1989) ==
Historical population
Year	Pop.	±%
1950	6,277,500	—
1955	8,037,084	+28.0%
1960	9,683,802	+20.5%
1965	10,869,244	+12.2%
1970	11,408,071	+5.0%
1975	11,673,554	+2.3%
1980	11,618,281	−0.5%
1985	11,829,363	+1.8%

In 1947, the number of wards was reduced from 35 to 23, though the Metropolis limits stayed the same.

=== Occupation of Japan ===
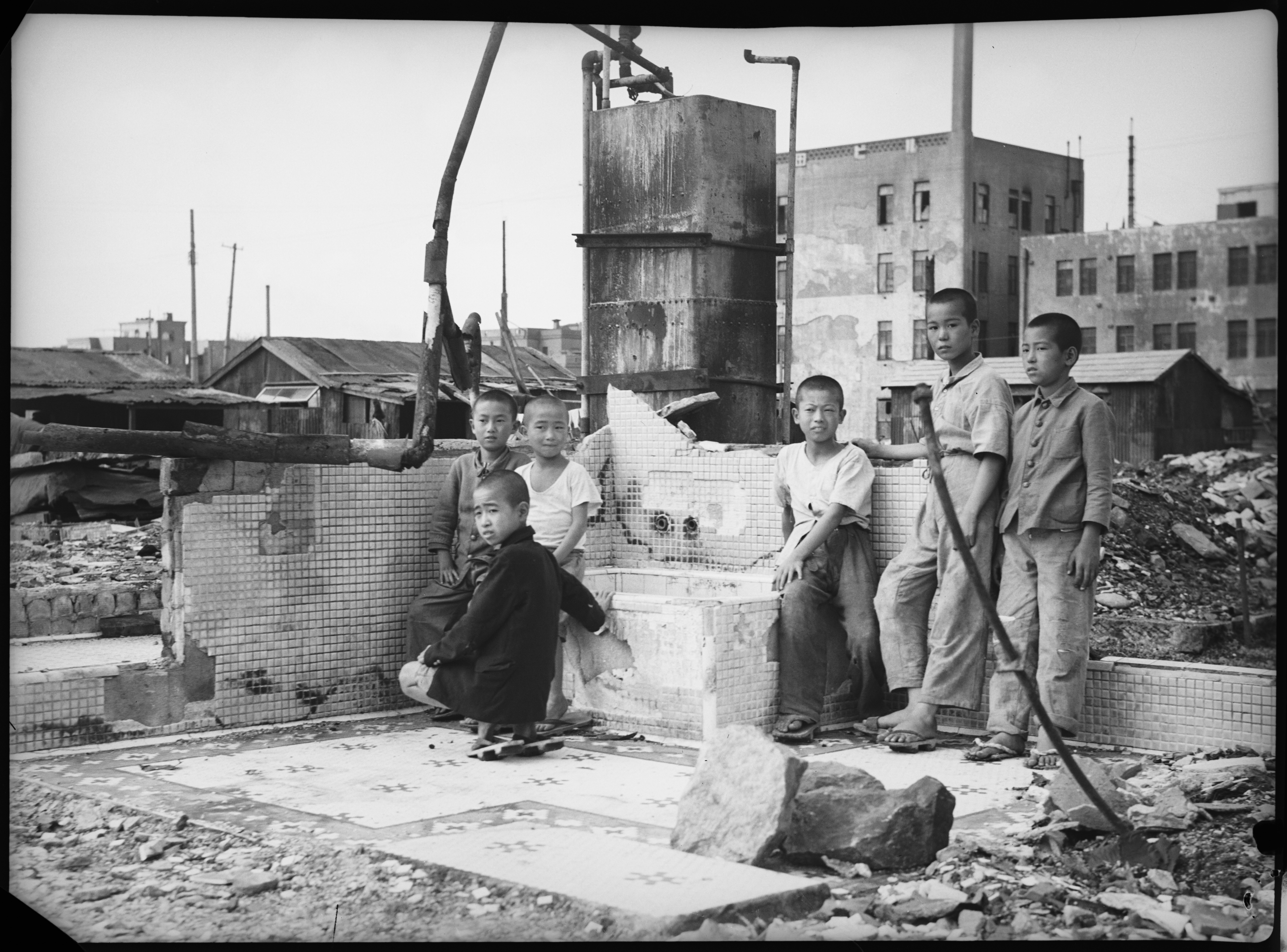
Japanese children living in the ruins of Tokyo in 1945

Douglas MacArthur's American forces occupied Japan starting in 1945. Americans headquarters were established at Marunouchi, and American soldiers stayed in temporary housing at former military grounds in Harajuku. Arms industries were dismantled, political prisoners were released, and Japanese soldiers and civilians from abroad were repatriated to Japan. In 1947, a new constitution, creating a democratic government, replaced the Meiji Constitution. It reduced the emperor's status to a symbolic one, removed Japan's right to declare war, and let women vote. The Supreme Court of Japan was established, modeled after the U.S. Supreme Court. Education was reformed, the numbers of farmers who were tenants were reduced, and zaibatsu business conglomerates were broken up. Labor unions were encouraged until the Cold War intensified.

The occupation encourage economic stimulation, and by the mid- or late-50s, Tokyo was essentially the same as in 1940, economically. Profits from America's Korean War (1950 to 1953) were used for rebuilding. The U.S. tried to end the occupation in 1947, but the Soviet Union rejected a peace treaty with Japan. A treaty was signed in 1951, and the U.S. left in 1952. Afterwards, American military bases stayed in Japan, for use in the Korean, Cold, and Vietnam Wars. Japan was involved in military manufacturing, and repurposed their old surplus.

=== International Military Tribunal for the Far East ===
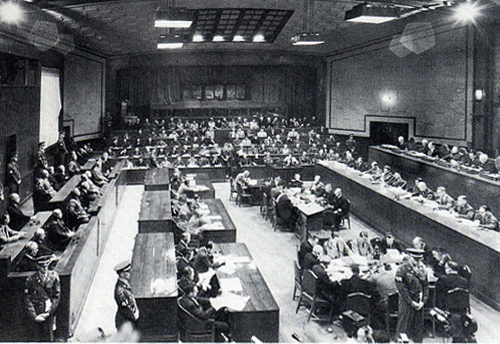
A view of the IMTFE in session

In the International Military Tribunal for the Far East, 25 Japanese leaders were tried for war crimes. The tribunal was established by a charter from Douglas MacArthur on 19 January 1946, basing it off the Nuremberg trials charter. It convened in April 1946, and was held in the former Ministry of War Building in Ichigaya. In May, the prosecution opened its case, and charged the defendants with "crimes against peace, conventional war crimes, and crimes against humanity". Prosecutors argued the crimes were systemic and widespread, and that the defendants knew of the crimes and did not attempt to stop them. Many American prisoners of war testified. The defense argued Japan was acting in self-defense, and that war crimes had not been established as international law. 25 defendants were convicted; 16 were given life imprisonment, seven were sentenced to death by hanging, and two were given lesser terms. Those convicted for a life sentence did not serve it, except those who died naturally in prison. The rest were pardoned or paroled by 1958. Hideki Tōjō was sentenced to hanging; he died in Tokyo in 1948.

=== Post-war development ===
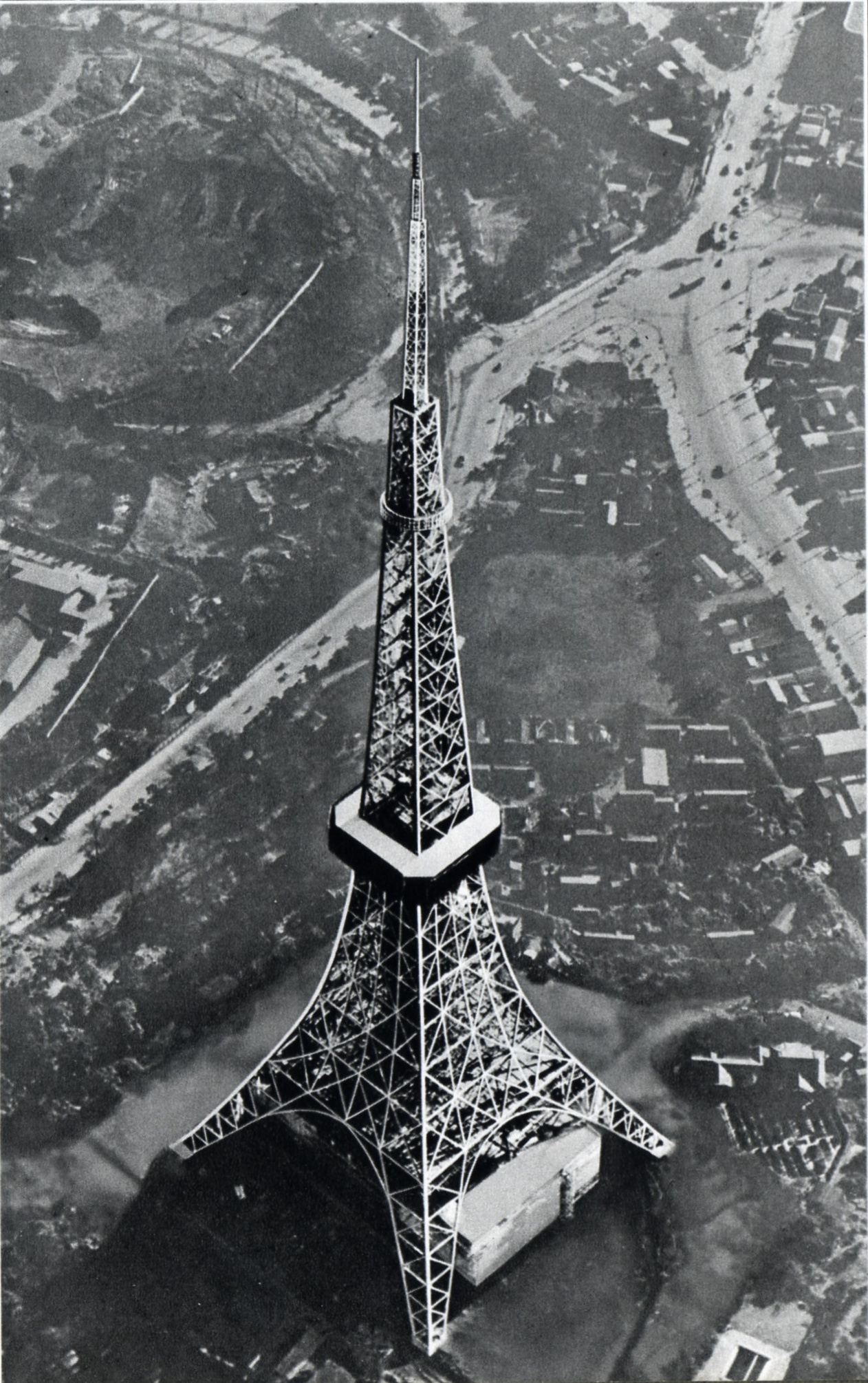
Minato's Tokyo Tower in 1961

In the 50s, power in Tokyo was spread from the center to around the city, as the fukutoshin (secondary city centers) of Shinjuku, Shibuya, and Ikebukuro were promoted. The Seibu department store chain started in Ikebukuro. American-style supermarkets opened in Tokyo, at first in the richer southwestern districts. They grew in the 60s when more people were wealthy. As rail and road networks expanded into rural areas, the former farming towns of Nerima, Kita, and Itabashi were repurposed as retail estate. In 1963, it was made illegal to keep a family automobile in the street space in front of a family home. This led to a massive replacement of front green spaces with parking spaces.

The Tokyo Tower, a 333-meter tall steel tower resembling the Eiffel Tower, was built to transmit television signals, and symbolized Japan's future when it opened in 1958. Other notable buildings from this era were the National Diet Library, National Museum of Western Art, Tokyo Bunka Kaikan, Hotel New Otani Tokyo, and the Hotel Okura Tokyo. A trolleybus system operated in the 50s and 60s, and was replaced by buses and taxicabs. New Metro lines, the Marunouchi Line and Hibiya Line, opened. The second Tokyo rapid transit system, the Toei Subway, started in 1960 with the opening of the Toei Asakusa Line. Japan's Shinkansen high-speed railway opened in 1964, in time for the 1964 Summer Olympics. The first line was the Tōkaidō Shinkansen, which ran from Tokyo to Osaka.

The Yoshiwara and Susaki red light districts were both destroyed in 1945. Yoshiwara turned back into a red light district, with 200 soaplands in 1990. Susaki rebuilt to be a quiet, conservative place. It was removed from the shoreline by landfills, losing one of its notable features. A new red light district opened at Hatonomachi, and was closed in 1958. That was when prostitution was outlawed, leading to protests, but the business survived.

=== Art and entertainment ===
Occupation censorship rules were "almost as harsh" as imperial censorship; a new strategy was to remove cultural references to some elements of traditional culture, though kabuki and martial arts stayed. Some elements of culture still were opposed to occupation, Teruko Akatsuki's hit song "Tokyo Shoeshine Boy" is one example.

Postwar, Akhibara capitalized on incoming freight trains by shifting to selling appliances and electronics. By 1990, it became known as the "Electric Town", and became home to the Akiba-kei style of otaku nerd culture. However, by 1990, Chiyoda sold the most electronics in the city. Toei Company studios for film and animation were made in Nerima and Suginami.

=== Social movements ===
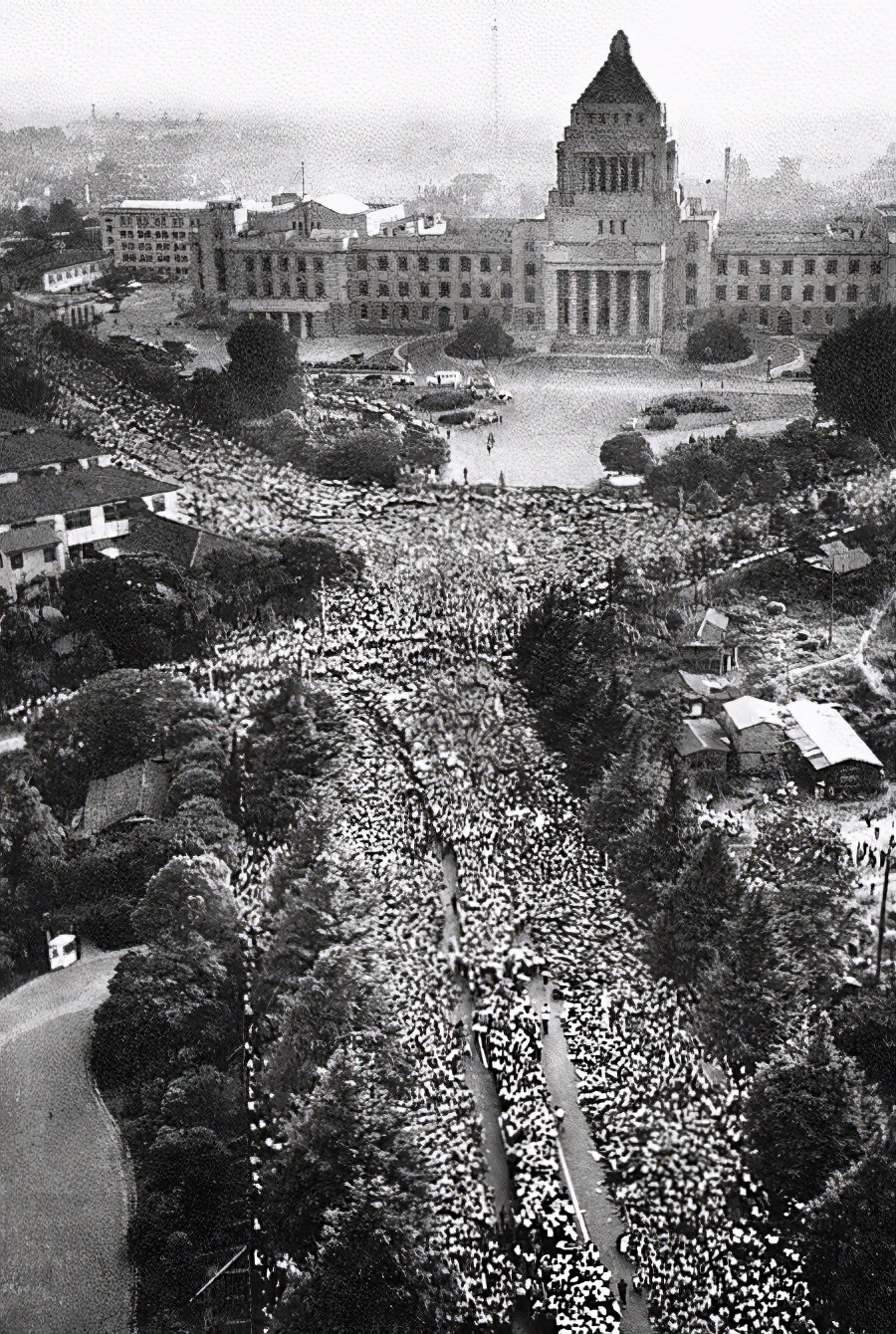
A protest against the U.S.–Japan Security Treaty around the National Diet building on 18 June 1960

The violent Sunagawa Struggle from 1955 to 1957 protested the expansion of the U.S. Air Force's Tachikawa Air Base into the nearby village of Sunagawa. During the Anpo protests of 1959 and 1960, the Japanese New Left protested the U.S.–Japan Security Treaty, which led to a controversial new treaty. Later, protests occurred in response to American military bases in Japan being used for the Vietnam War, and American military presence in Okinawa.

During the 1968–1969 Japanese university protests, students at Tokyo University seized the school's main hall, the Yasuda Hall. They expelled the president and other administrators and took hold of the building. It was named the "Yasuda Castle" by the media. They were expelled in the summer of 1968, and attempted to recapture the building in January 1969. The students failed to take it after a battle with 10,000 policemen, which was viewed nationwide on television. Protests over the United States-Japan Security Treaty reoccurred in 1970, but were less successful.

In 1978, Yasukuni Shrine in Kudanshita became a memorial to Imperial Japan, including 2.5 million Japanese soldiers of World War II, and 12 major convicted war criminals, including Hideki Tojo. The shrine said those dead needed to be honored as they served their country. It also contains exhibits suggesting Japanese imperialism was a heroic liberation of Asia from Western colonialism. Visits to the shrine by right-wing government officials have caused controversy in countries affected by Japanese imperialism during the war.

=== 1964 Summer Olympics ===
The 1964 Summer Olympics closing ceremony on 24 October

Tokyo's population reached ten million as the 1964 Summer Olympics left a deep impact on Japan's national identity. The nation's wounded psyche and reputation from the war were significantly healed. Rapid social changes, thematically staged in the Olympic ceremonies, let Japan display a new national pride, their re-entry into the circle of developed industrial countries, and their disavowment of imperialist militarism. Although Japan's foreign policy was closely linked to the United States during the Cold War, Tokyo hosted the 1964 Games in the spirit of peaceful engagement with the entire world, including Communist states. Enormous expense was devoted to upgrading the city's physical infrastructure and making new businesses. A new satellite facilitated live international broadcasts. The Tokyo National Museum's coinciding ancient art exhibition promoted Japan's traditional culture to foreigners and the Japanese themselves. Two buildings made for the games were the Yoyogi National Gymnasium and National Olympic Stadium. The event proved a great success for the city and for Japan. Japan's foreign policy expanded to include sports diplomacy, as Japanese teams visited international competitions. Harujuku grew after being adjacent to the Olympic Village. The Encyclopædia Britannica states that while the games had positive effects on the city, their effort in the rebuilding is exaggerated, using America's funds from the Korean War as an example of other avenues of rebuilding.

=== 1960s elections ===
In March 1965, the city's prefectural council elected a new president. It was a corrupt election, involving intimidation and bribery. The president and other members were arrested. The law was amended so the council was forced to dissolve itself. A new election was called. When the election occurred in July, conservatives lost half their seats, an indictment of Ryotaro Azuma that partially stemmed from an incident in June and July, in which a large swarm of flies descended onto a garbage fill, Dream Island, east of the Sumida. The army removed them by lighting Dream Island on fire, leading to garbage disposal issues. This led to socialist and communists promoting television personality Ryokichi Minobe in preparation for the 1967 gubernatorial elections.

In the early 1960s, heavy smog forced citizens to wear face masks, and buy oxygen from vending machines. Toxic air required the construction of first aid stations, and the covering of plastic drapes over pavement cafes. Ryokichi Minobe was elected governor, serving three terms until 1979. He was elected by a populace who felt the government focused on financial growth "at the expense of welfare reform and environmental concerns". He froze funding for some highway construction, built traffic-free pedestrian malls, and limited pollution by putting pressure on heavy industry to move outside city limits. Smog would be "almost entirely eliminated" by 1980.

=== Crime ===
Otoya Yamaguchi preparing to stab Inejiro Asanuma a second time at the Hibiya Public Hall on 13 January 1960

On 13 January 1960, the leader of the Japan Socialist Party, Inejirō Asanuma, was assassinated at a political rally in Tokyo's Hibiya Public Hall. A 17-year-old rightist named Otoya Yamaguchi stabbed Asanuma on stage, in front of 1,000 people (including Prime Minister Hayato Ikeda). Yamaguchi had a note in his pocket explaining he killed Asanuma for his left-wing policies, remarks he made during a speech in China, and for his supporters storming the National Diet building. 15,000 leftist demonstrators marched on the police headquarters demanding the police chief, Kameyoshi Teramoto, resign. 2,000 policemen beat them back, and 60 were injured. Before trial, Yamaguchi died by suicide at the Tokyo Juvenile Rehabilitation Center.

In 1960, Chuo Karan magazine published a satire story in which left-wing revolutionaries storm the Imperial Palace and behead Crown Prince Akihito and Princess Michiko. The story was meant to be a satire of the far-left, but it angered rightists and nationalists instead. The Imperial Household Agency disliked it, and right-wing nationalists protested daily outside the Chuo offices in Tokyo. On 1 February 1961, a rightist broke into the home of Chuo's president, Hoji Shimanaka, killed his maid, and injured his wife. Shimanaka apologized, the author, Shichiro Fukazawa, went into hiding, and it created a taboo where publishers refused to publish similar satires thereafter.

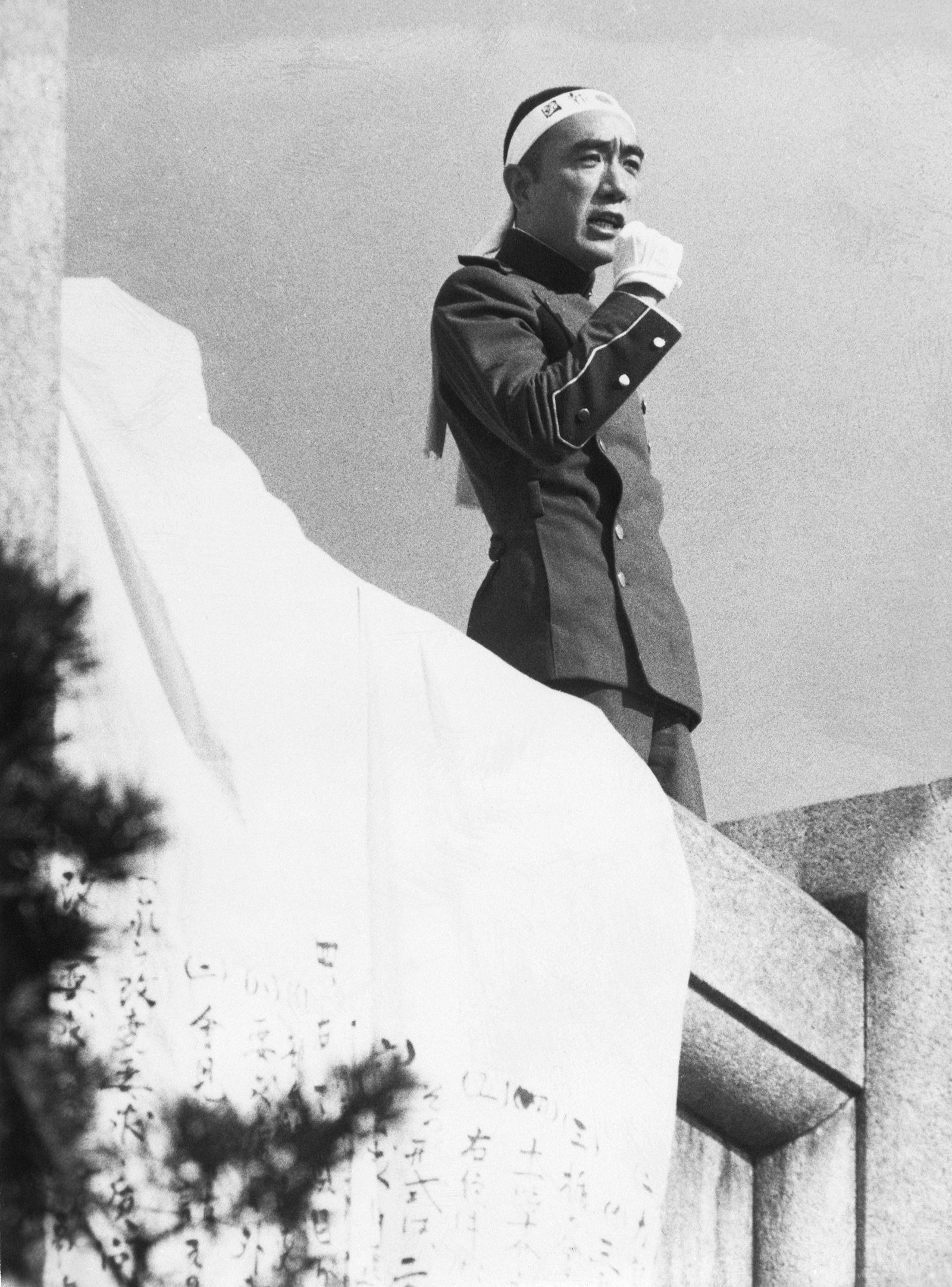
Yukio Mishima speaking during his coup attempt at the Japan Ground Self-Defense Force building on 25 November 1970

Yukio Mishima was a writer who is regarded by many critics as the most important Japanese novelist of the century. In the 1960s, he became attached to Japanese nationalism, and wished to restore the emperor's power. On 25 November 1970, Mishima seized the commanding general's office at a military headquarters in downtown Tokyo, with four members of the Shield Society student army. On the building's balcony, Mishima gave a 10-minute speech to a thousand servicemen, in which he urged them to overthrow the post-war Japanese constitution. The soldiers were unsympathetic. Mishima committed seppuku with a sword, and was decapitated by a co-conspirator.

In 1973, South Korean opposition leader Kim Dae-jung was kidnapped by Korean intelligence in Tokyo and sent back to Korea by boat, almost being murdered at sea.

Multiple bombs were set off in the 1970s by groups protesting against Japanese imperialism, and the construction of Narita Airport in Chiba Prefecture. In 1974, a bomb was detonated at the Mitsubishi office of Mitsubishi Heavy Industries, which killed eight people. It was done by the anti-imperialist group, Anti-Japanese Armed East Asian Front.

=== Late Shōwa development ===
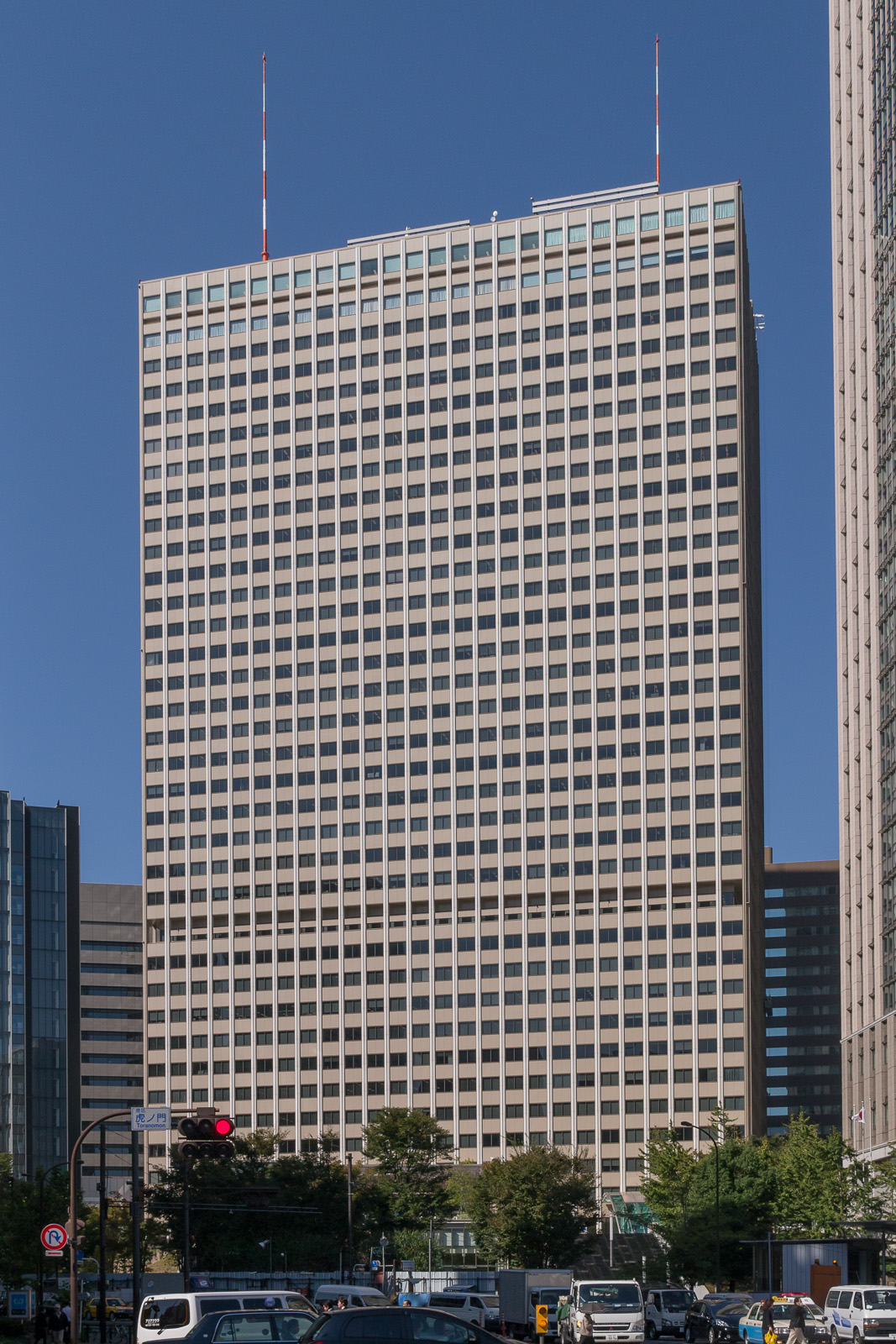
The Kasumigaseki Building in Kasumigaseki, Chiyoda

The Kasumigaseki Building opened in 1968. It was notable for its earthquake-resistant design and height, being the tallest building Tokyo at the time, and considered its first "super high-rise building". At the site of the former Yodobashi reservoir in Shinjuku, a new plaza was created in 1966, the Shinjuku Westmouth. The Keio Plaza Hotel was the plaza's first super high-rise. The World Trade Center, Shinjuku Sumitomo Building, Shinjuku Mitsui Building, and Sunshine 60, were all the tallest buildings in Japan at one point.

Other notable constructions were the Shinjuku Center Building, National Theatre of Japan, National Archives of Japan, United Nations University, Nakagin Capsule Tower, University of Tsukuba, 109, Tokyo Disneyland, and the Tokyo Dome. Notable transportation projects from this time were the Tokyo Metro Tozai Line, Toei Mita Line, Tokyo Metro Chiyoda Line, Tokyo Metro Yūrakuchō Line, Tokyo Metro Hanzōmon Line, Toei Shinjuku Line, Jōetsu Shinkansen, and the Tōhoku Shinkansen.

Various "new town" housing development projects were built in the late 1960s and 1970s to house communities on the outskirts of Japan's major cities. The most 'celebrated' was Tama New Town opened in 1971. Its 50-square meter apartments sold for about ¥5 million each. In Ginza, the Yurakucho Mullion business center opened in 1984, quickly receiving 200,000 daily visitors. It eventually became headquarters of The Asahi Shinbun. Ikebukuro remained one of the busiest districts in the city, getting its own "Westmouth" plaza which has Sunshine 60, but it did plateau in activity, compared to Shinjuku or Ginza. Asakusa declined due to their diminishing theater scene, but rebounded by 1990. The Sanya slums did not match the city's initial economic boost after occupation. They had slow improvement in the following decades, but were still slums by 1990. Another famous slum from this time was Omoide Yokocho (or 'Piss Alley') at the Shinjuku Westmouth.

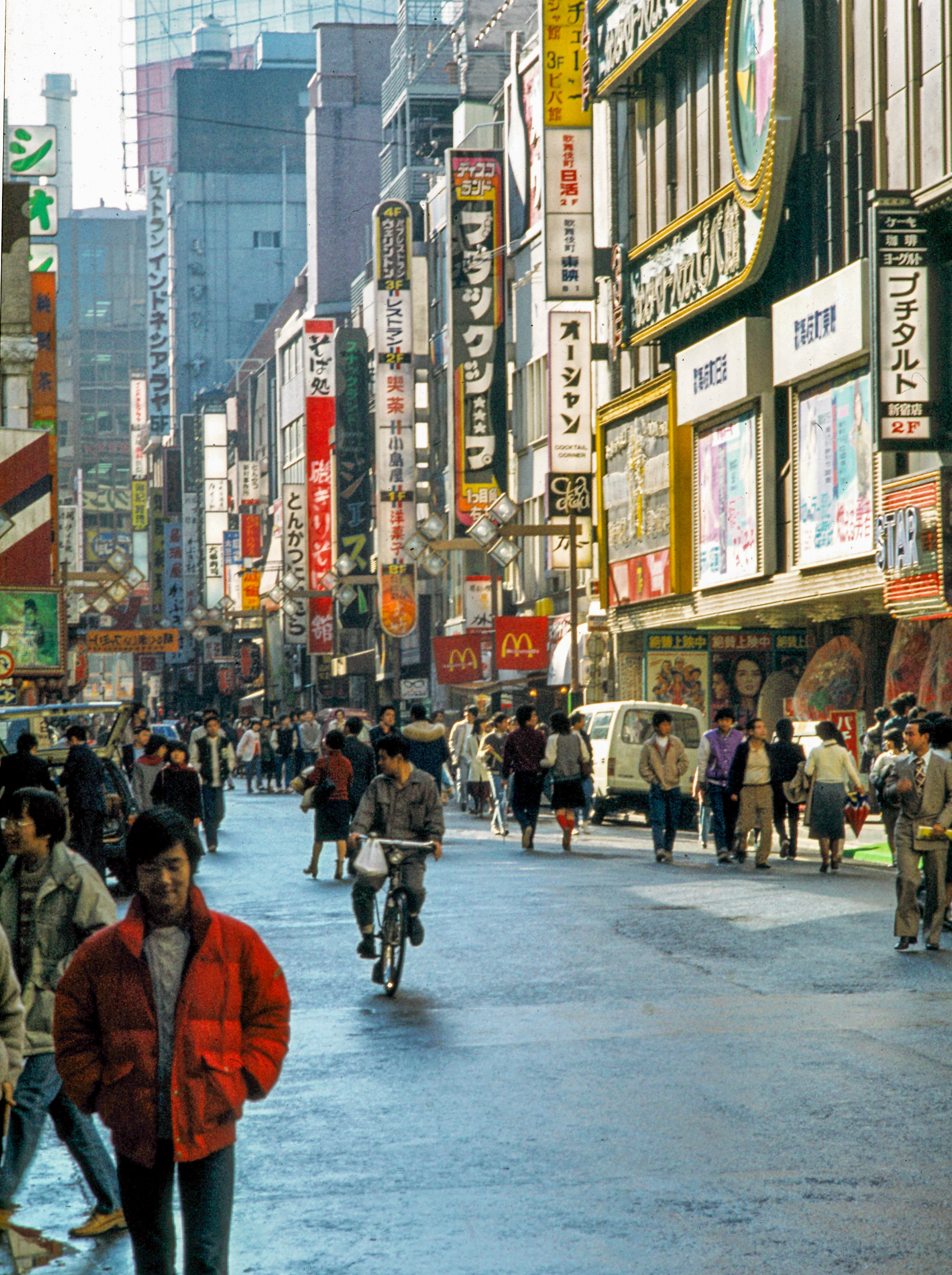
The Kabukicho district of Shinjuku in 1982, before police cracked down on its illegal activities

The Golden Block and Kabukicho districts became important parts of Shinjuku. Kabukicho was home to various illegal activities, including prostitution, that police cracked down on in 1984 and 1985. At the crackdown's beginning, there were about 132 illegal sex work businesses there. Afterwards, those activities were not advertised, and they were sought out by decrypting various codes. The district then tried to become a center for performing arts, and somewhat failed.

==== Economy ====
Japan's economic miracle slowed after the 1973 oil crisis. In the mid-70s, Tokyo experienced significant inflation. 1975 prices in the Tokyo ward were four times what they had been 25 years prior. This made manufacturing more expensive, but the economy still grew, as Japan survived importing expensive raw materials.

Japan in the 1980s experienced a "bubble" economy, as the stock market index soared from 6000 in 1980 to 40,000 in 1989. Tokyo experienced a huge increase in urban land prices. This "land bubble" led to new strategies in urban development. to preserve the profitability of real estate schemes, developers used several means of action to increase building density, such as urban renewal. They experimented with new methods of avoiding land purchase, such as land deposit and short-term lease contracts. High-rise buildings were built, huge department stores flourished, and modern concrete buildings progressively replaced wooden houses within residential zones. This process was not closely controlled by authorities, and it produced many high-rise buildings that increased road traffic and worsened parking problems. On 31 December 1989, the Bank of Japan raised interest rates, which brought the inflated land prices down. The bubble collapsed in the 1990s, and the nation entered decades of economic stagnation known as the 'Lost Decades'.

=== Death of Hirohito ===
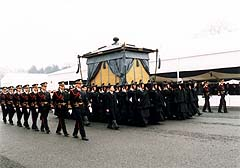
The funeral procession for Hirohito (by then renamed Showa) on 24 February 1989

On 7 January 1989, Hirohito died in Tokyo, and his son, Akihito, became the emperor. This ended the Showa era and began the Heisei era. His death was announced by the Grand Steward of Japan's Imperial Household Agency, Shōichi Fujimori, who revealed details about his cancer for the first time. On 24 February, his body was transferred from the Imperial Palace to the Shinjuku Gyoen Imperial Garden, where his funeral was held. His controversies led to the funeral being high-security, and was boycotted by socialist and communist leaders. 100,000 people took part in rallies denouncing him as a war criminal. Multiple explosions were detonated across the city.

== Heisei era (1989–2019) ==
Historical population
Year	Pop.	±%
1990	11,855,563	—
1995	11,773,605	−0.7%
2000	12,064,101	+2.5%
2005	12,576,601	+4.2%
2010	13,159,388	+4.6%
2015	13,515,271	+2.7%

Defined by United Nations estimates, Tokyo was the world's largest city in 2018 with 37,468,000 people. Judged by city proper, it was the 12th largest with 13,515,271.

=== Early Heisei development ===
The Tokyo Metropolitan Government Building, a new capitol building for the city, opened in 1991 in Nishi-Shinjuku. Built for 156.9 billion yen, it was the tallest building in Japan until 1993. The Rainbow Bridge opened in 1993, and spurred new development in Odaiba, a district on an artificial island in Tokyo Bay. Naikaku Sōri Daijin Kantei, the official residence of the Prime Minister, opened in 2002.

Other notable constructions were the Shinjuku Park Tower, Tokyo Opera City Center, Fuji Broadcasting Center, Tokyo Big Sight, NTT Docomo Yoyogi Building, Aijnomoto Stadium, Ghibli Museum, and the Roppongi Hills Mori Tower. Notable transportation projects were the Tokyo Metro Namboku Line and the Toei Oedo Line.

=== Art and entertainment ===
As Japan's manufactured exports declined post-bubble-collapse, it has focused more on its popular culture exports, like movies, literature, and video games, which is the impetus of the 'Cool Japan' marketing strategy that advertises places like Akihabara.

In the 1990s, Shibuya was the origin of the Shibuya-kei music genre, which combined pop, electronic, and hip-hop.

In 2001, Myojo 56, a low-rise building and entertainment facility in Kabukicho, caught fire, and 44 people were killed.

=== Governorship of Yukio Aoshima ===
Yukio Aoshima, Tokyo governor from 1995 to 1999, was previously an entertainer and Diet member. As an independent, he won the 1995 gubernatorial election. He fulfilled his campaign promise of canceling the World City Expo '96 in Odaiba, which disrupted several large construction projects, and was opposed by the city assembly. The expo was planned to make permanent housing for 50,000 residents, and 2.6 million tickets had been sold in advance at the time of cancellation. He resigned in 1999 and continued working as an entertainer.

=== Aum Shinrikyo ===
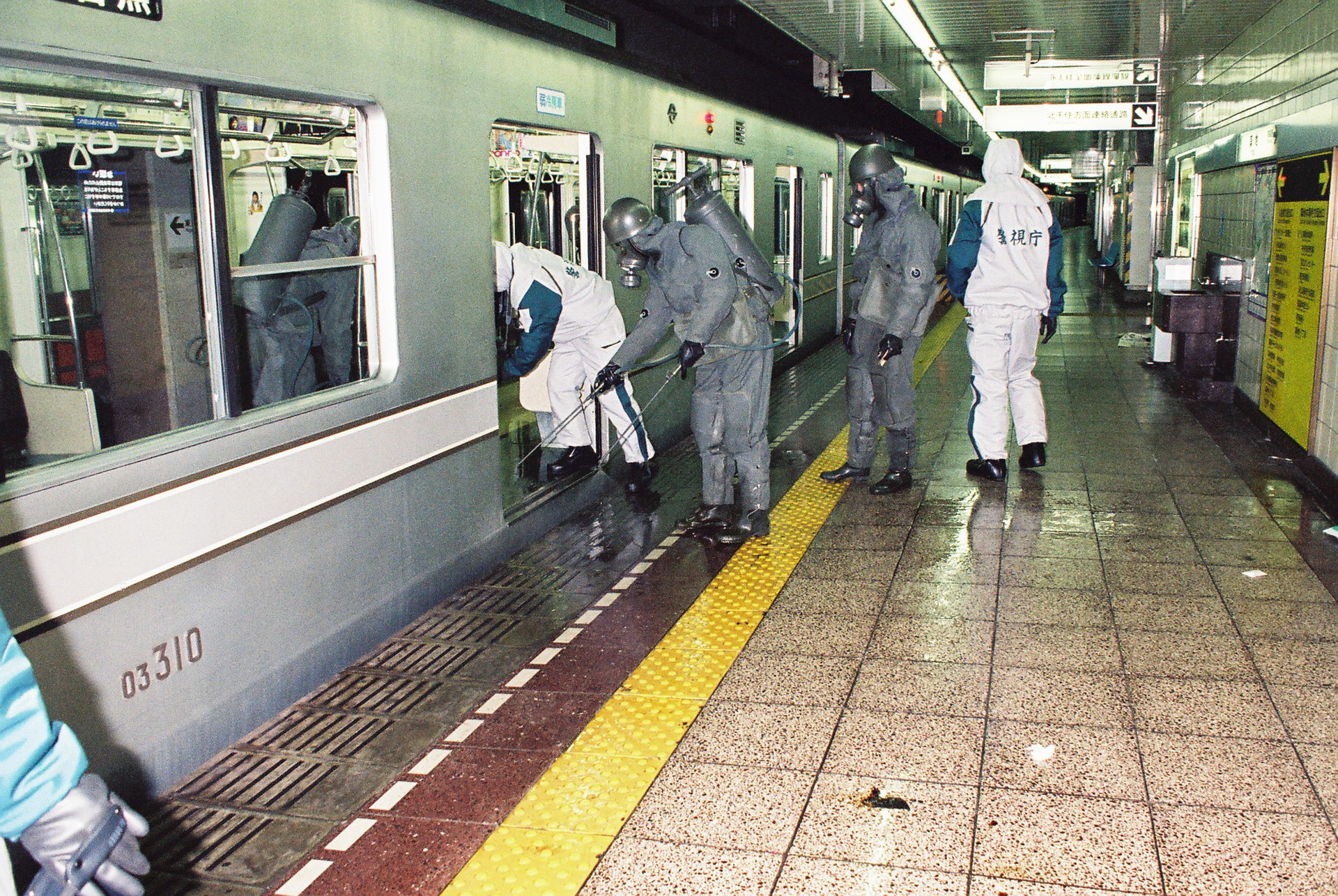
Police officers and Japan Defense Force troops responding to the scene of the 1995 subway sarin attack

On 20 March 1995, the doomsday cult Aum Shinrikyo coordinated a multiple-point terrorist attack in the Tokyo subway. Five members on five different lines heading towards Tsukiji Station dropped bags containing a large of amount of sarin, an "odourless, colourless and highly toxic nerve gas", in different subway cars. The fumes started sickening passengers, and were spread at each stop when passengers left different stations. The attacks killed 14 people and injured 5,500. Police raided Aum Shinrikyo headquarters in Tokyo and its laboratory in Yamanashi, and seized the toxic chemicals used to create the sarin. Later that year, a dozen of the cult's highest figures were arrested in nationwide raids, including the leader Shoko Asahara. He and six other members were executed in 2018.

In May 1995, Aum Shinrikyo tried to kill Aoshima at his Tokyo City Hall office. They sent a mail bomb there, hidden in a book which exploded days later and injured his secretary, Masaaki Utsumi. Aoshima was not present, as he won the election in April and had not moved in yet.

=== Governorship of Shintaro Ishihara ===
Shintaro Ishihara, Tokyo governor from 1999 to 2012, was described as a nationalist. Originally a writer, in March 1999, he announced he would run for Governor of Tokyo as an independent. He easily outdistanced his rivals, Yasushi Akashi and Koji Kakizawa, in the 1999 gubernatorial election. During the election season, Ishihara called for the American Yokoto Air Base to return to Japan, which was a sensitive issue for Japan-U.S. relations. He also criticized China's policies. He dealt with Tokyo's debt by cutting government spending and implementing new revenue sources, like a hotel occupancy tax. He also backed Tokyo's failed 2016 Olympics bid. He won re-election in 2003, 2007, and 2011. In 2012, he resigned to successfully run for a set in the Diet's lower house.

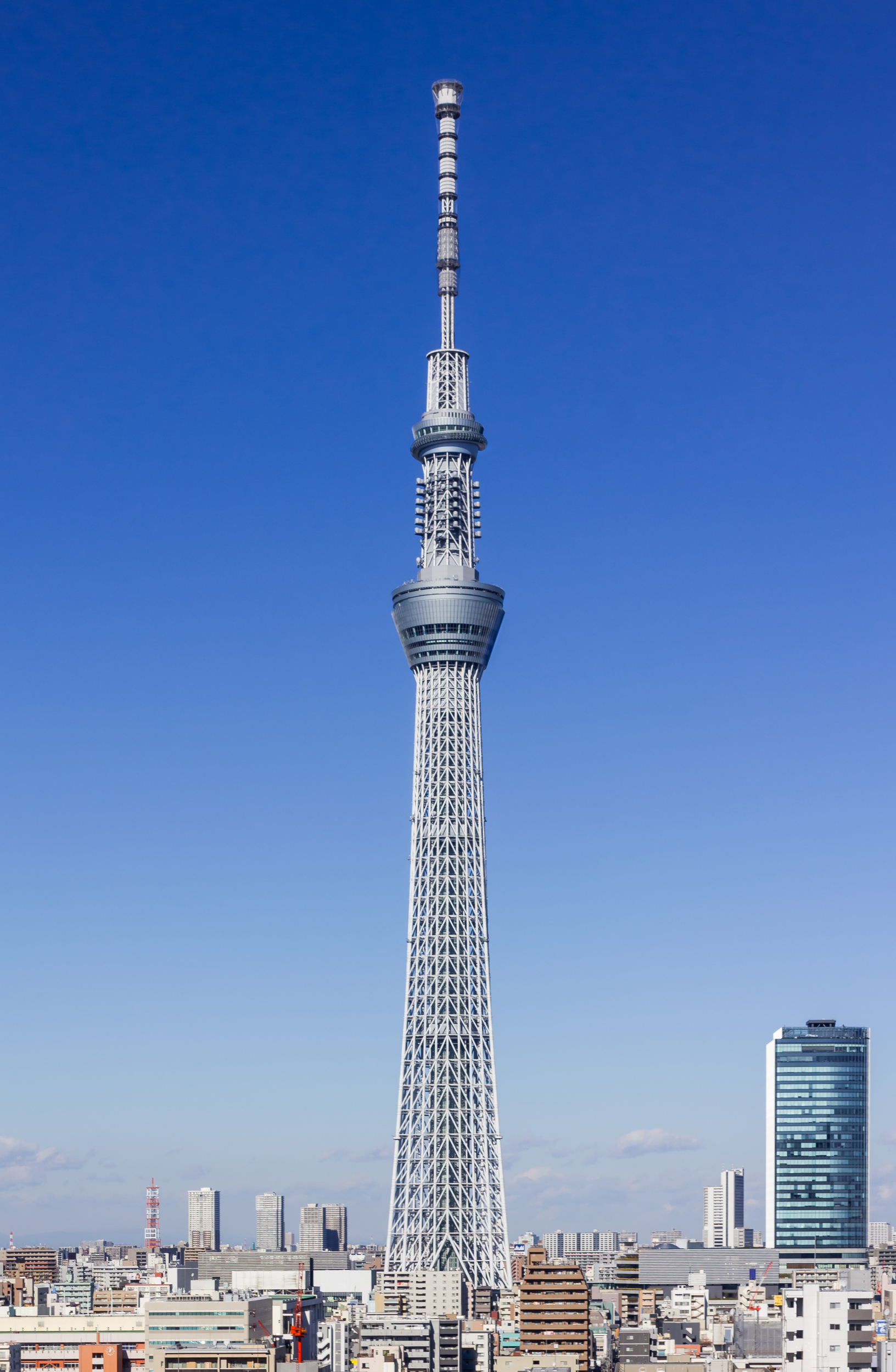
The Tokyo Skytree in 2014

=== Late Heisei development ===
The Midtown Tower, a mixed-use skyscraper in Akasaka, was the tallest building in Tokyo when construction was completed in January 2007. In 2011, Japan's tallest structure, the Tokyo Skytree, was completed. It is 634 meters high, and surpassed the CN Tower in Toronto as the world's tallest free-standing structure.

Other notable constructions were Sumitomo Fudosan Roppongi Grand Tower, Shibuya Scramble Square, National Art Center, Mode Gakuen Cocoon Tower, and Toranoman Hills. The Tokyo Metro Fuktoshin Line opened in 2008.

During Tokyo's 2016 Olympics bid, Japan considered building a new National Stadium. The stadium would have cost $1.3 billion, and it never came to fruition; the International Olympic Committee (IOC) criticized the plan as being a source for potential disaster, as the stadium was surrounded on three sides by water. In 2011, Japan's sports ministry started considering renovating the National Stadium if the city were to win the bid for the 2020 Summer Olympics. In 2013, the IOC voted Tokyo to host the 2020 Games. The old National Stadium was demolished in 2015, and a different version of a new stadium was built from 2016 to 2019 for ¥157 billion ($1.4 billion).

=== 2011 Tōhoku earthquake ===
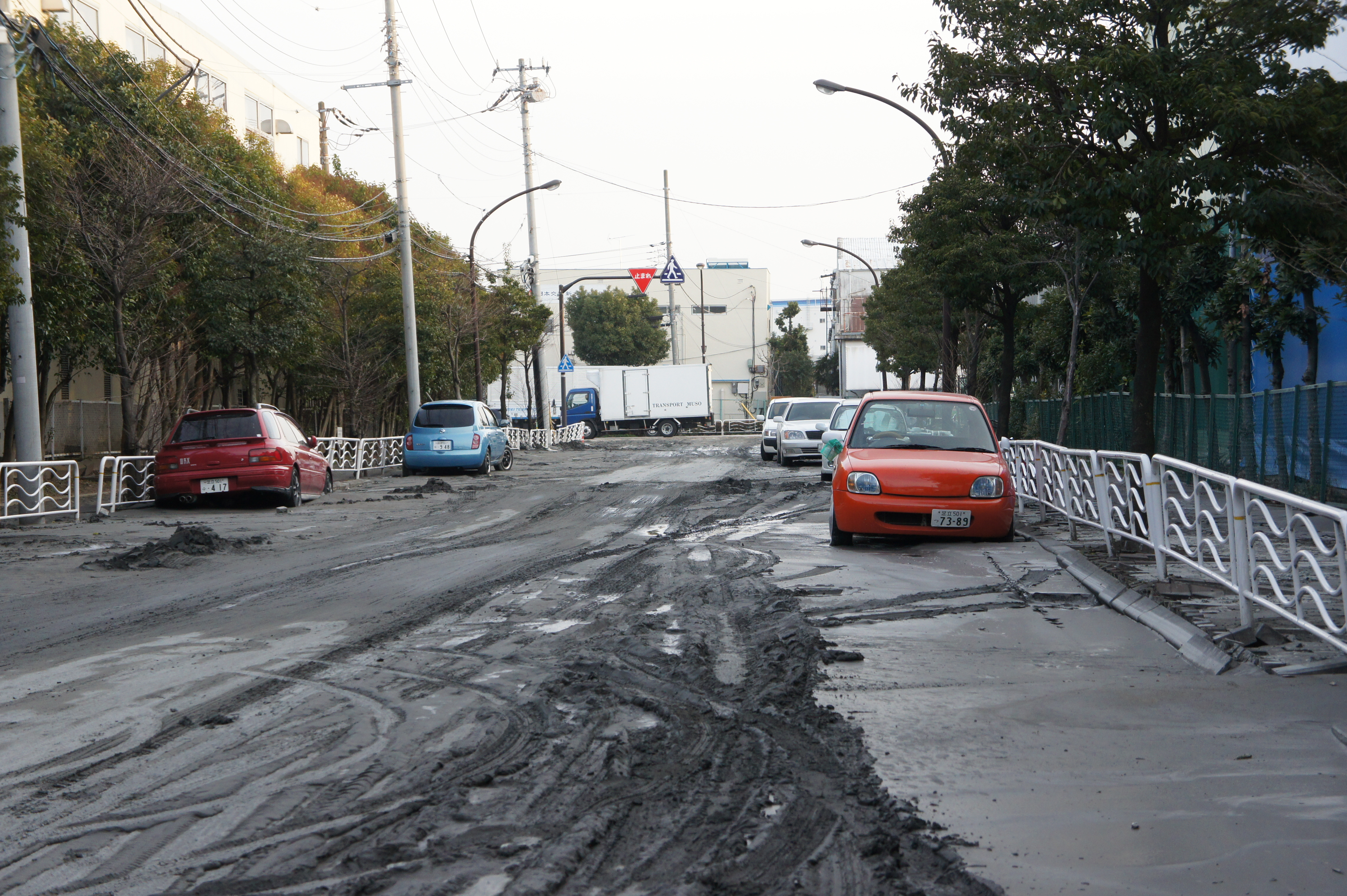
Soil liquefaction in Kōtō after the 2011 Tōhoku earthquake

The 2011 Tōhoku earthquake that devastated much of the northeastern coast of Honshu was felt in Tokyo. The seismic intensity in Tokyo was 5+ on the JMA seismic intensity scale. Soil liquefaction was evident in areas of reclaimed land around the city. Approximately 30 homes or buildings were destroyed and 1,046 other buildings were damaged. Power shortages caused rolling blackouts in Tokyo, beginning on 14 March. Radioactivity was later detected in Tokyo's tap water. All of Japan's ports were shut down after the earthquake, though the ones in Tokyo and southwards re-opened sooner.

== Reiwa era (2019–present) ==
=== COVID-19 pandemic and the 2020 Olympics ===
The disease COVID-19 began spreading globally in early 2020, and this spread was declared to be a pandemic by the World Health Organization in March. The pandemic greatly affected Tokyo. Starting in January, there were fears that the disease would negatively impact the 2020 Olympics, which were planned for that summer. In February, Olympic qualifying tournaments were cancelled, while a Tokyo 2020 official said the games would continue as usual. In March, the IOC announced the games would be postponed by a year.

An April 2020 broadcast in Shibuya calling for people to stay home during the COVID-19 pandemic

There was a large spike in COVID cases in the city in July. The Japanese government warned citizens that they had a greater risk of transmitting and receiving COVID, which is spread through airborne particles, in '3C' settings: 'close spaces with poor ventilation, crowded areas, and close conservation areas'. Offices, public transit, and shops were considered to be low-risk. For the month of August, bars, restaurants, and karaoke parlors were asked to close at 10 p.m. Those that complied with the request were eligible for compensation of $1,900 USD. The city also announced the founding of a public health institute similar to the American CDC which would coordinate a citywide pandemic response.

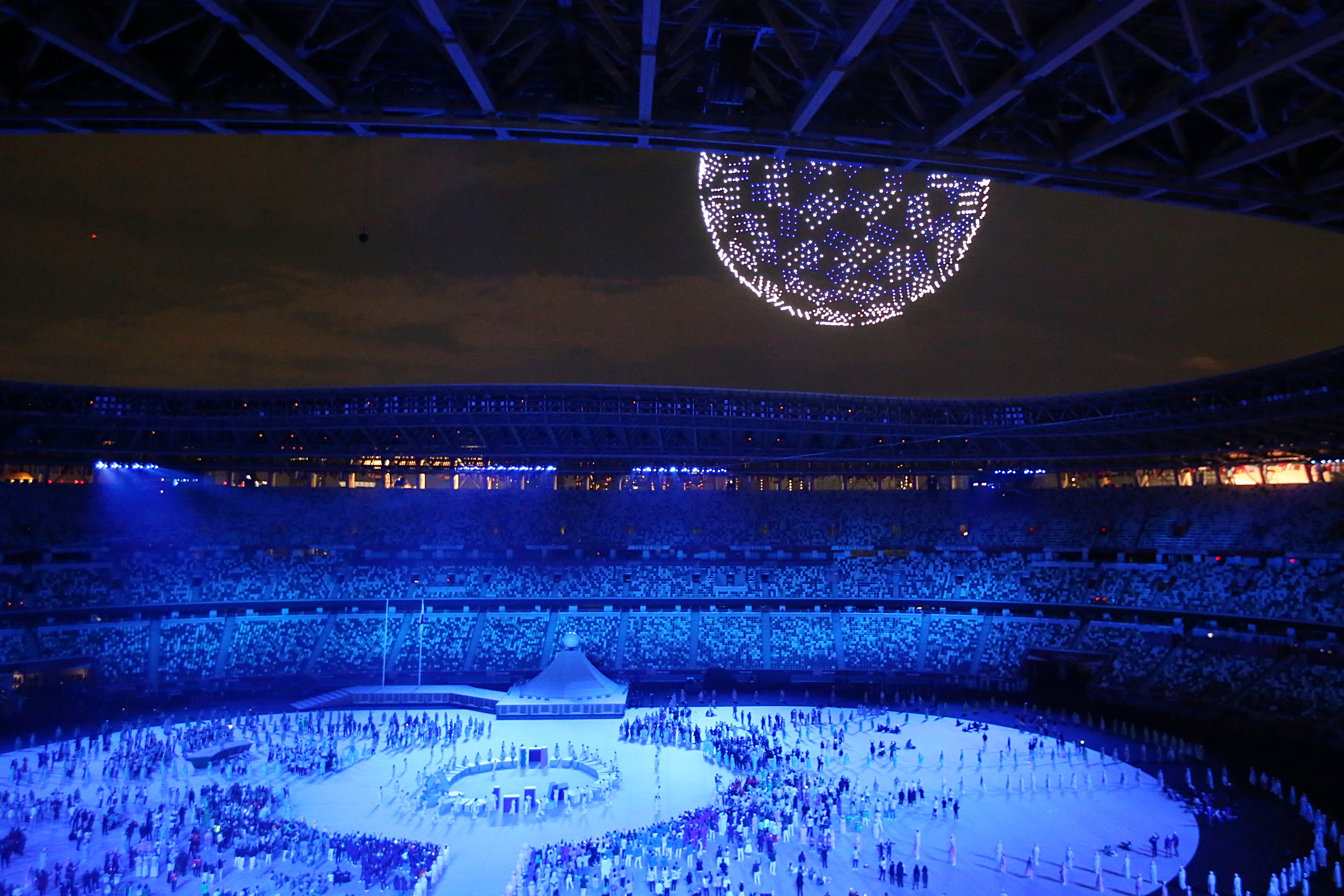
A scene of the 2020 Summer Olympics opening ceremony, where 1,824 drones formed the 2020 Games' logo

By January 2021, Japan's government announced that international spectators could not enter the country for the Olympics. The government was still preparing for the Games, despite national polls showing a majority of the country wanted them postponed further or cancelled. In July, all spectators were banned from the Games' facilities.

The Olympics' opening ceremony was on 23 July 2021, and their closing ceremony was on 8 August. The 2020 Games were the most expensive Olympics at the time, costing $15.4 billion USD. Different sources say they either helped Tokyo's economy, or worsened it.

=== 2024 Haneda Airport collision ===
In 2024, there was a collision on a Haneda Airport runway between two planes, a Japan Airlines commercial flight and a Japan Coast Guard rescue plane. The collision ignited destroyed both aircraft; five of the six Coast Guard crew died, with only the captain surviving, and everyone aboard the airliner survived.

=== Development ===
So far, notable Reiwa-era Tokyo buildings have been the Tokyo Midtown Yaesu complex (and its centerpiece, Yaesu Central Tower), the Tokyu Kabukicho Tower, and the Azabudai Hills complex in Toranoman, which includes Azabudai Hills Mori JP Tower, currently Japan's tallest building. Two notable projects under construction are the Torch Tower and the Nihonbashi 1-Chome Central District Redevelopment.

== See also ==
- Timeline of Tokyo
- List of governors of Tokyo
- List of tallest structures in Japan
  - List of tallest structures in Tokyo
