= Edo society =

Society of Japan from 1603 to 1868

A social hierarchy chart based on old academic theories. Such hierarchical diagrams were removed from Japanese textbooks after various studies in the 1990s revealed that peasants, craftsmen, and merchants were in fact equal and merely social categories. Successive shoguns held the highest or near-highest court ranks, higher than most court nobles.

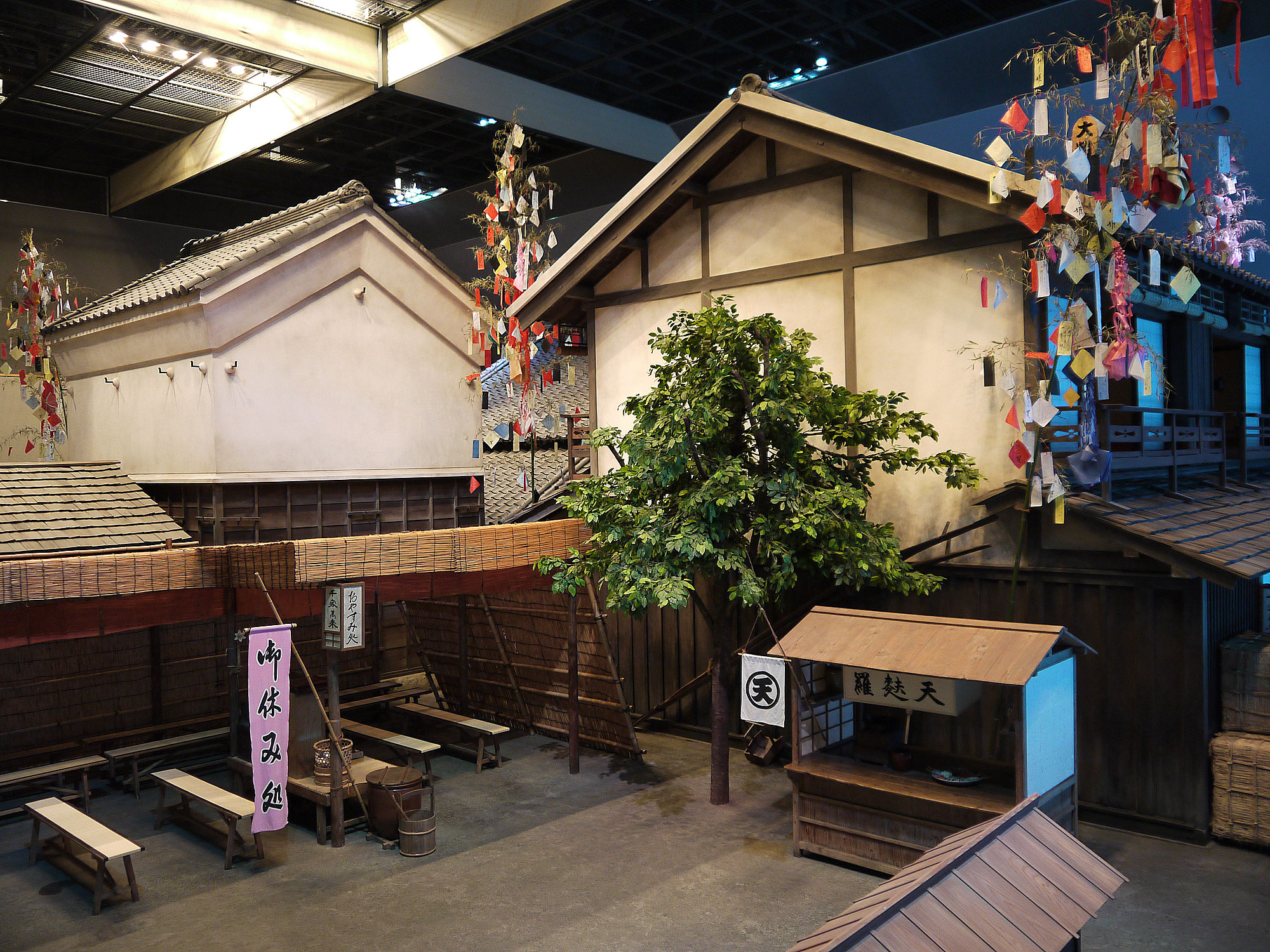
Working class district of the Edo period (Fukagawa Edo Museum)

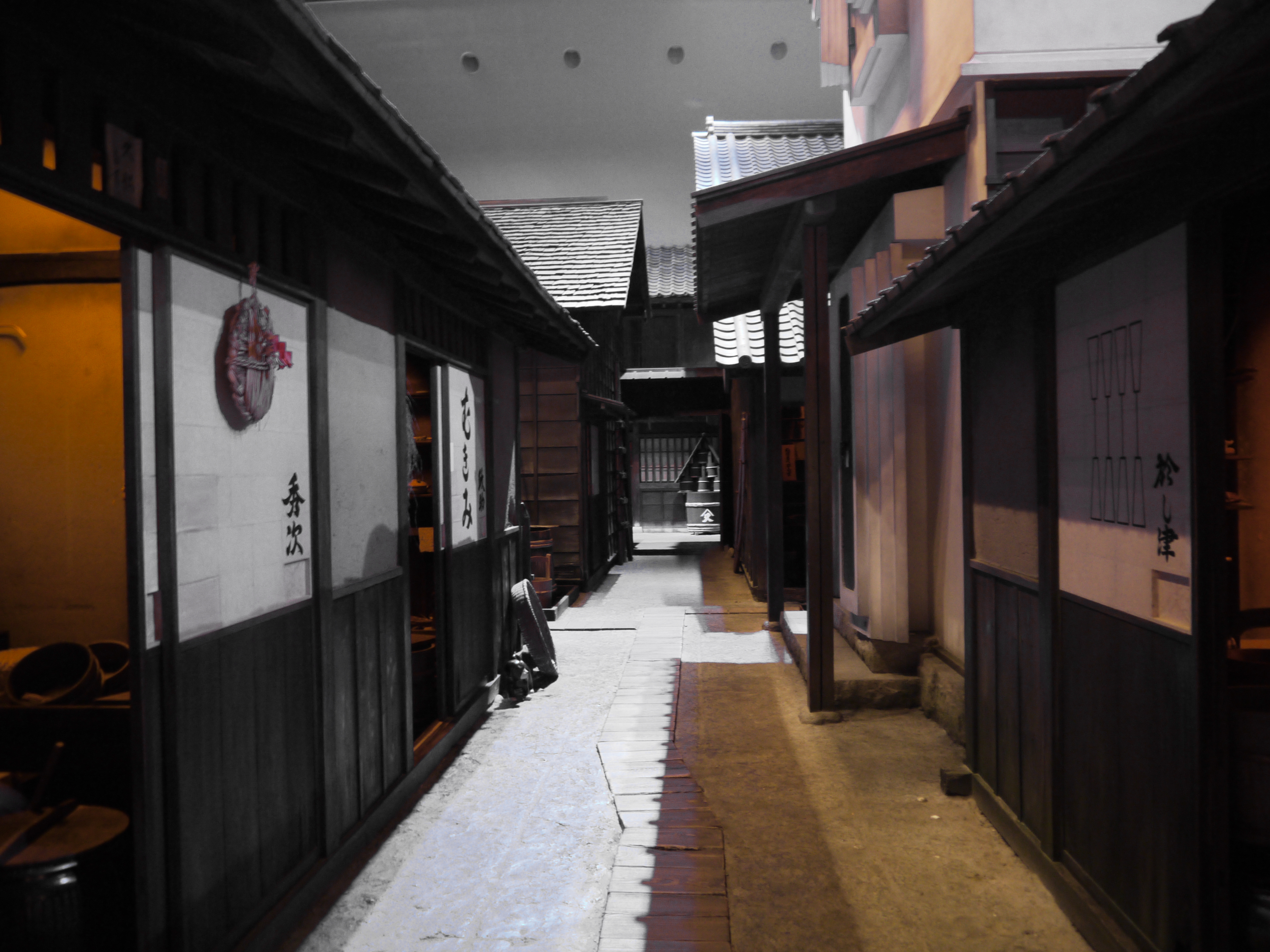
Working class district apartments (Fukagawa Edo Museum)

Edo society refers to the society of Japan under the rule of the Tokugawa Shogunate during the Edo period from 1603 to 1868.

Edo society was a feudal society with strict social stratification, customs, and regulations intended to promote political stability, despite existing in the early modern period, not the Middle Ages. The Emperor of Japan and the kuge were the official ruling class of Japan but had no power. The shōgun of the Tokugawa clan, the daimyō, and their retainers of the samurai class administered Japan through their system of domains. The majority of Edo society were commoners divided into peasant, craftsmen, and merchant classes, and various "untouchable" or Burakumin groups.

The Tokugawa shogunate ruled by dividing the people into four main categories. Older scholars believed that there were Shi-nō-kō-shō (士農工商, Four Occupations) of "samurai, peasants (hyakushō), craftsmen, and merchants" (chōnin) under the daimyo, with 80% of peasants under the 5% samurai class, followed by craftsmen and merchants. However, various studies have revealed since about 1995 that the classes of peasants, craftsmen, and merchants under the samurai are equal, and the old hierarchy chart has been removed from Japanese history textbooks. In other words, peasants, craftsmen, and merchants are not a social pecking order, but a social classification.

The bakumatsu from 1853 on led to growing opposition to the Edo system and it was dismantled after the Meiji Restoration in 1868.

== Historical context ==
Feudalism, social stratification, and explicit fine-grained ranking of people existed in Japan long before the Edo period, beginning with attempts as far back as the Taika Reforms in 645 AD, initiating the Ritsuryō legal system that was modeled from Chinese Tang dynasty legal code. The reforms were following a major and devastating coup d'etat attempt by Soga no Emishi, with the events not only exterminating entire clans, but tearing apart a gaping hole in the Japanese indigenous religion, Ko-Shintō, paving the way for a Buddhist-Shinto syncretism of religion.

The Taika Reforms were the "legal glue" deemed necessary to thwart future coup d'etat attempts, and the Ritsuryō system led to the formation of castes in Japan. Nevertheless, frequent warfare and political instability plagued Japan in following centuries, providing countless opportunities to usurp, bend, and mobilize positions within social ranks. Even the ranks themselves, especially military ranks, became more respected if only out of necessity.

Confucian ideas from China also provided the foundation for a system of strict social prescriptions, along with political twists and turns of the Ashikaga Shogunate established a loose class system when it ruled Japan as a feudal shogunate during the Muromachi period from 1338 to 1573. The final collapse of the Ashikaga worsened the effects of the Sengoku period (or "Age of Warring States"), the state of social upheaval and near constant civil war in Japan since 1467. Tokugawa Ieyasu of the Tokugawa clan and his Eastern Army emerged victorious after the Battle of Sekigahara in 1600, defeating the Western Army of his primary rival, Toyotomi Hideyori.

Ieyasu founded the Tokugawa Shogunate as the new government of Japan with himself as the shōgun. However, he was determined to stamp out the social mobility that had existed for centuries, given that Toyotomi Hideyoshi, one of his peers and a kampaku (Imperial Regent) whom he replaced, was born into a low caste as the son of peasants, yet had forged himself into one of Japan's foremost political figures. The Tokugawa clan determined that Japanese society should be divided into specific classes, both to streamline their administration and to ensure that no potential rivals could ever gain the political or military support necessary to challenge them.

== Tokugawa class system ==
=== Aristocracy ===
==== Emperor ====
The Emperor of Japan was the official ruler of Japan at the very top of the Tokugawa class hierarchy. However, the Emperor was only a de jure ruler, functioning as a figurehead held up as the ultimate source of political sanction for the shōgun's authority. The Emperor and his Imperial Court located in Kyoto, the official capital of Japan, had unmatched prestige but virtually no political influence of any kind, and were forced to comply with the shogunate's wishes that they engage only in harmless artistic or cultural pursuits.

==== Court nobility ====
The court nobility, the kuge, were the civil aristocracy of Japan. Similar to the Emperor, the kuge were incredibly prestigious and held significant influence in cultural fields, but wielded very little political power and served functions only for symbolic purposes.

==== Shōgun ====
The shōgun was the de facto ruler of Japan. Officially, the shōgun was a title for a prominent military general of the samurai class appointed by the Emperor with the task of national administration. Successive shoguns held the highest or near-highest court ranks, higher than most court nobles. They were made Shō ni-i (正二位, Senior Second Rank) of court rank upon assuming office, then Ju ichi-i (従一位, Junior First Rank), and the highest rank of Shō ichi-i (正一位, Senior First Rank) was conferred upon them upon their death. In reality, the shōgun was a military dictator with only a nominal appointment from the Emperor who held the ultimate political power in Japan, controlling foreign policy, the military, and feudal patronage. The shōgun was a hereditary position held by members of the Tokugawa clan who were direct descendants of Tokugawa Ieyasu. The shōgun was based in the Tokugawa capital city of Edo, Musashi Province, located 370 kilometres (230 mi) east of Kyoto in the Kanto region, and ruled Japan with his government, the bakufu. The Tokugawa shogunate established that the court ranks granted to daimyo by the imperial court were based on the recommendation of the Tokugawa shogunate, and the court ranks were used to control the daimyo.

==== Daimyō ====
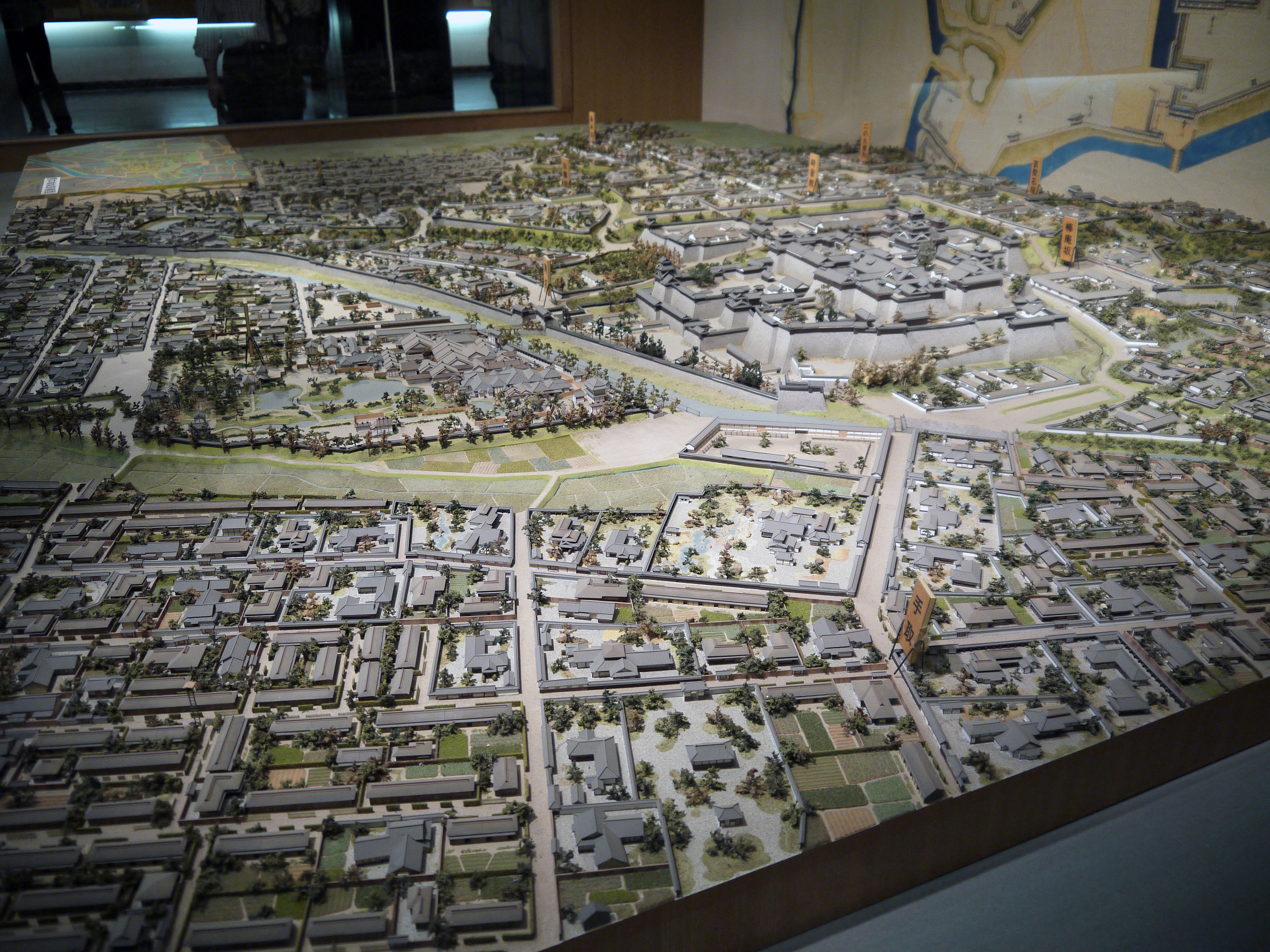
Model of the castle and city of Kumamoto in the Edo period

The daimyō were high-ranking members of the samurai, and, similar to the shōgun, held most of the real political power in Japan. They were chiefly responsible for administration through their large personal domains, the han, which served as unofficial administrative divisions in tandem with the legal provinces. A daimyō was determined if a samurai's domain was assessed at 10,000 koku (50,000 bushels) or more under the Tokugawa kokudaka system of taxation.

The daimyō held significant autonomy but the Tokugawa policy of sankin-kōtai required them to alternate living in Edo and their domain every year. The daimyō were separated into the shinpan, relatives of the Tokugawa, the fudai daimyō, who filled the ranks of the Tokugawa administration, and the tozama daimyō, those who only submitted to the Tokugawa after the Battle of Sekigahara. Tozama daimyo were considered disloyal and troublesome, and so were subjected to heavier civil burdens and tighter control by the shogunate, while also being denied important civil offices.

=== Four classes ===
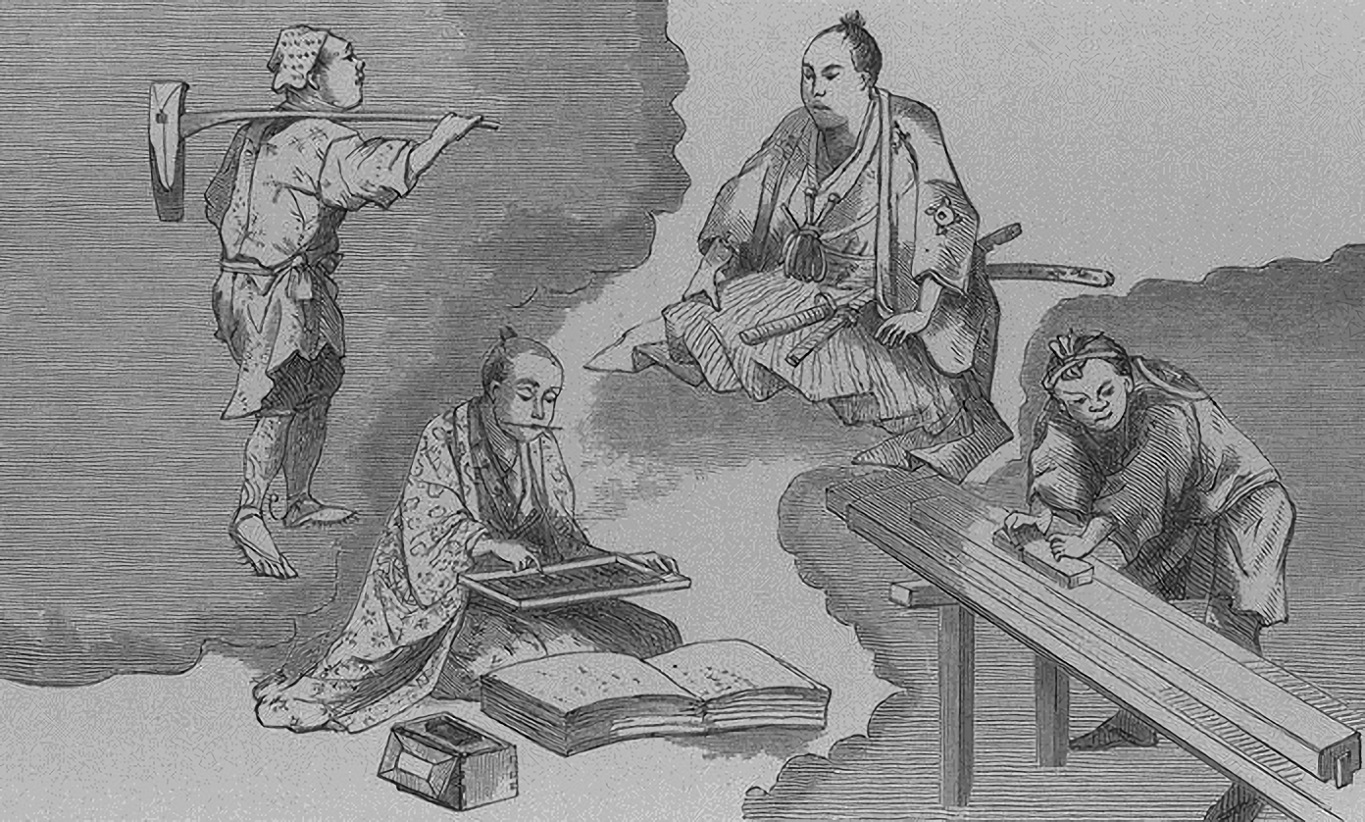
The four classes of society in Japan during the Edo period

The Tokugawa government intentionally created a social order called the "Four divisions of society" (shinōkōshō) that would stabilize the country. The new four classes were based on ideas of Confucianism that spread to Japan from China and were not arranged by wealth or capital but by what philosophers described as their moral purity. By this system, the non-aristocratic remainder of Japanese society was composed of samurai (士, shi), farming peasants (農, nō), artisans (工, kō) and merchants (商, shō).

Samurai were placed at the top of society because they were enforcers of the daimyo and set a high moral example for others to follow. The system was meant to reinforce their position of power in society by justifying the high status they were afforded. However, the shinōkōshō does not accurately describe Tokugawa society as Buddhist and Shinto priests, the kuge outside of the Imperial Court, and outcast classes were not included in this description of hierarchy.

In some cases, a poor samurai could be little better off than a peasant and the lines between the classes could blur, especially between artisans and merchants in urban areas. Still, the theory provided grounds for restricting privileges and responsibilities to different classes and it gave a sense of order to society. In practice, solidified social relationships in general helped create the political stability that defined the Edo period.

Regardless of their personal wealth or standing, samurai were expected to hold themselves as superior to all other classes. This was reflected in the right to strike and even kill with their sword anyone of a lower class who compromised their honour.

==== Samurai ====
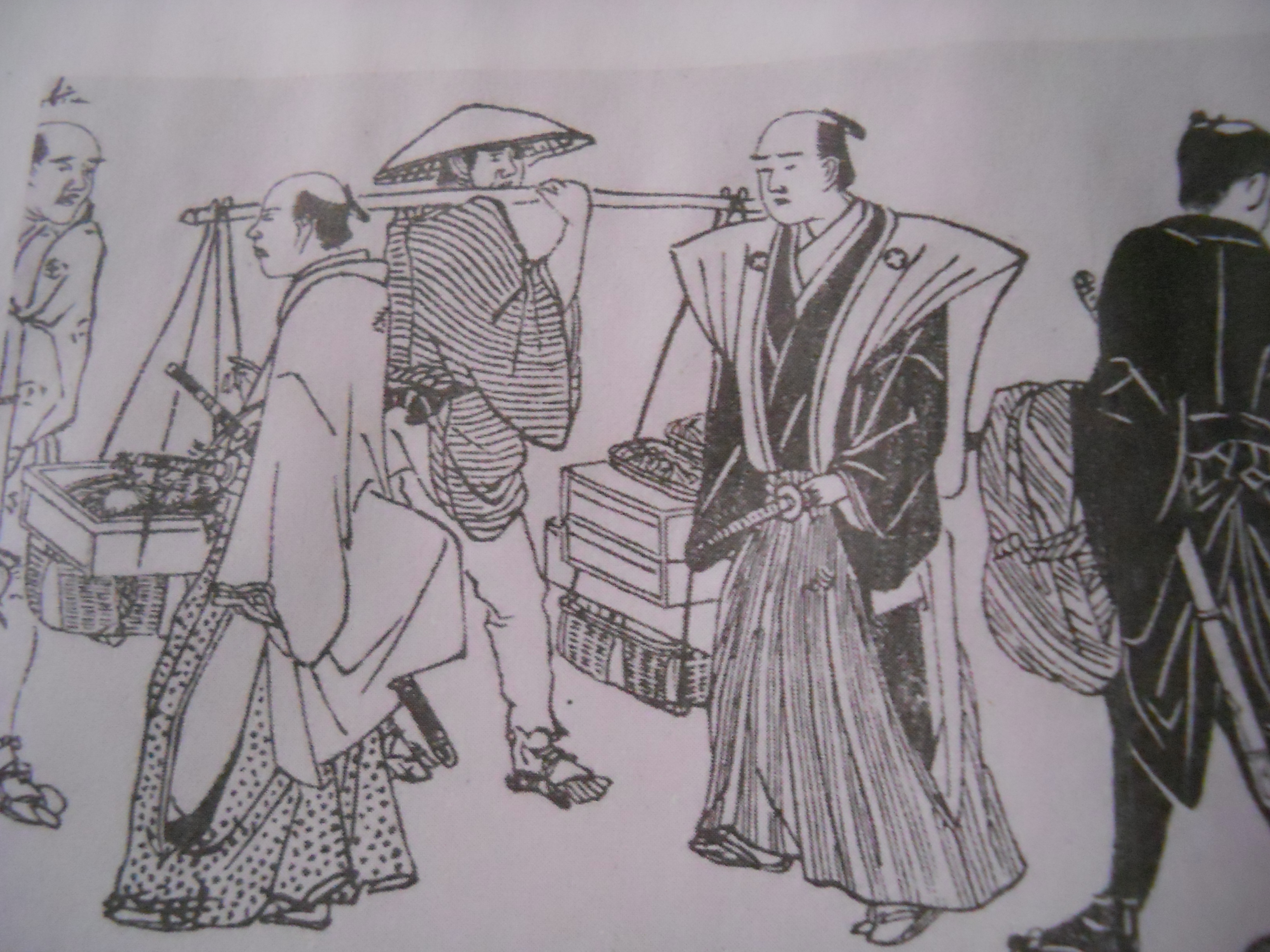
Samurai in the Edo period walking through town

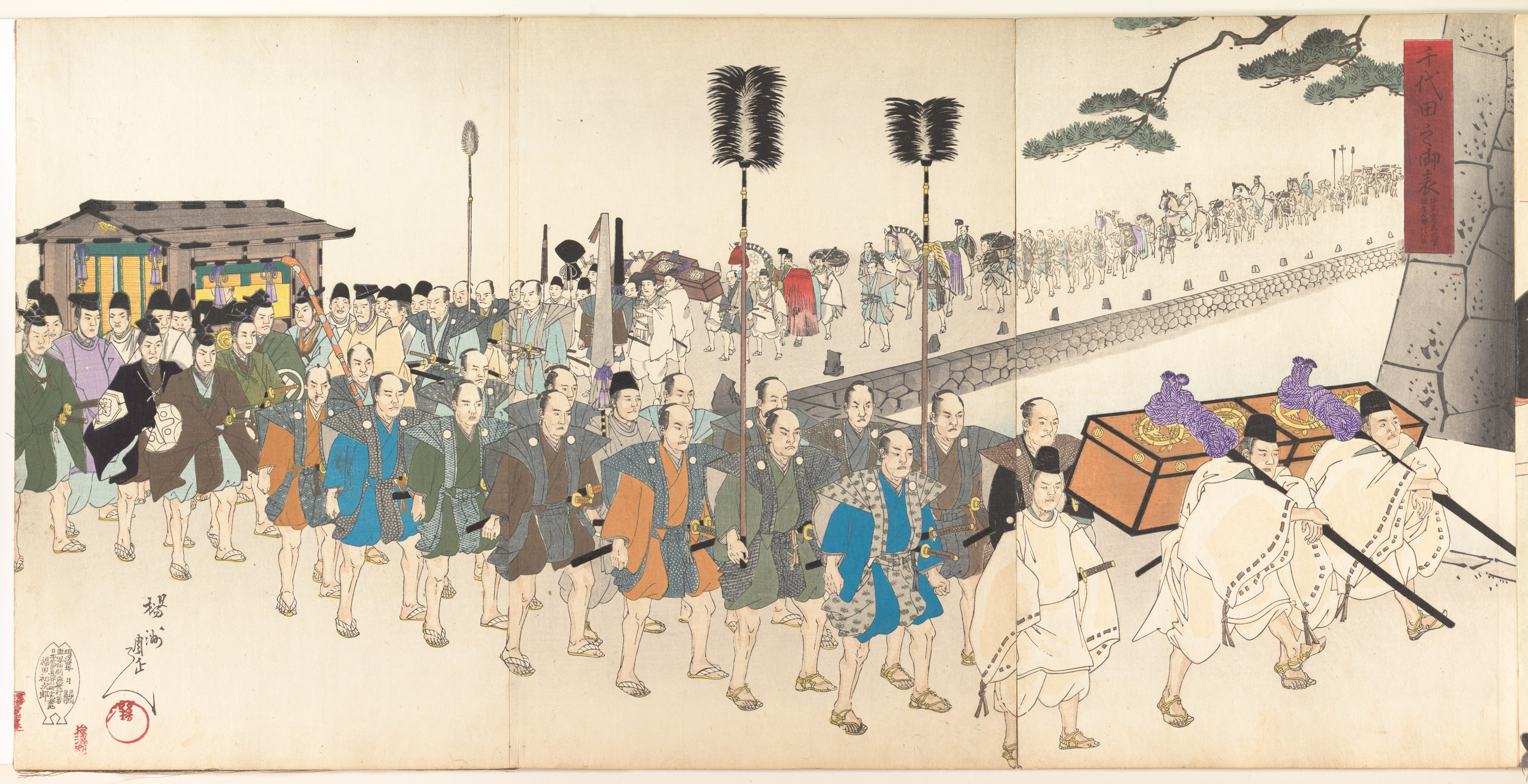
Samurai in the Edo period

Samurai were the noble (warrior) class in Japan. The samurai constituted about 10% of the population and functioned as soldiers in the employment of a lord in a traditional master-warrior feudal relationship. Other classes were prohibited from possessing long swords such as the tachi or katana and carrying both a long sword and a short sword became the symbol of the samurai class. However, their services were in limited demand as the Edo period was largely free from both external threats and internal conflicts.

Instead, the samurai maintained their fighting skills more as an art form and a symbol of their heritage. Samurai were paid a stipend from their lord but were forbidden to own land, engage in business, or earn their own money. Because of this, they were entirely dependent on their lord for survival. Samurai generally lived around their daimyō's castle. Small towns sprang up to support their needs and provide them with consumer goods and entertainment; these would slowly evolve into the modern cities of Japan.

There were social stratifications within the samurai class: upper-level samurai had direct access to their daimyō and could hold the most trusted positions in his court, with some achieving a level of wealth that allowed them to retain their own samurai vassals. Mid-level samurai held military and bureaucratic positions, and had some interactions with their daimyō if needed. Low-level samurai worked as guards, messengers and clerks. They could expect little more than a subsistence wage, and many fell deeply into debt as they had to borrow money to supplement their meager income.

Positions within the samurai class were largely hereditary and talented individuals could not rise above a few social steps beyond their birth. Samurai with no lords to support them, whether through disgrace or death, became rōnin. The rōnin were regarded as degenerates and criminals; they took whatever work they could find or resorted to theft.

==== Peasants ====
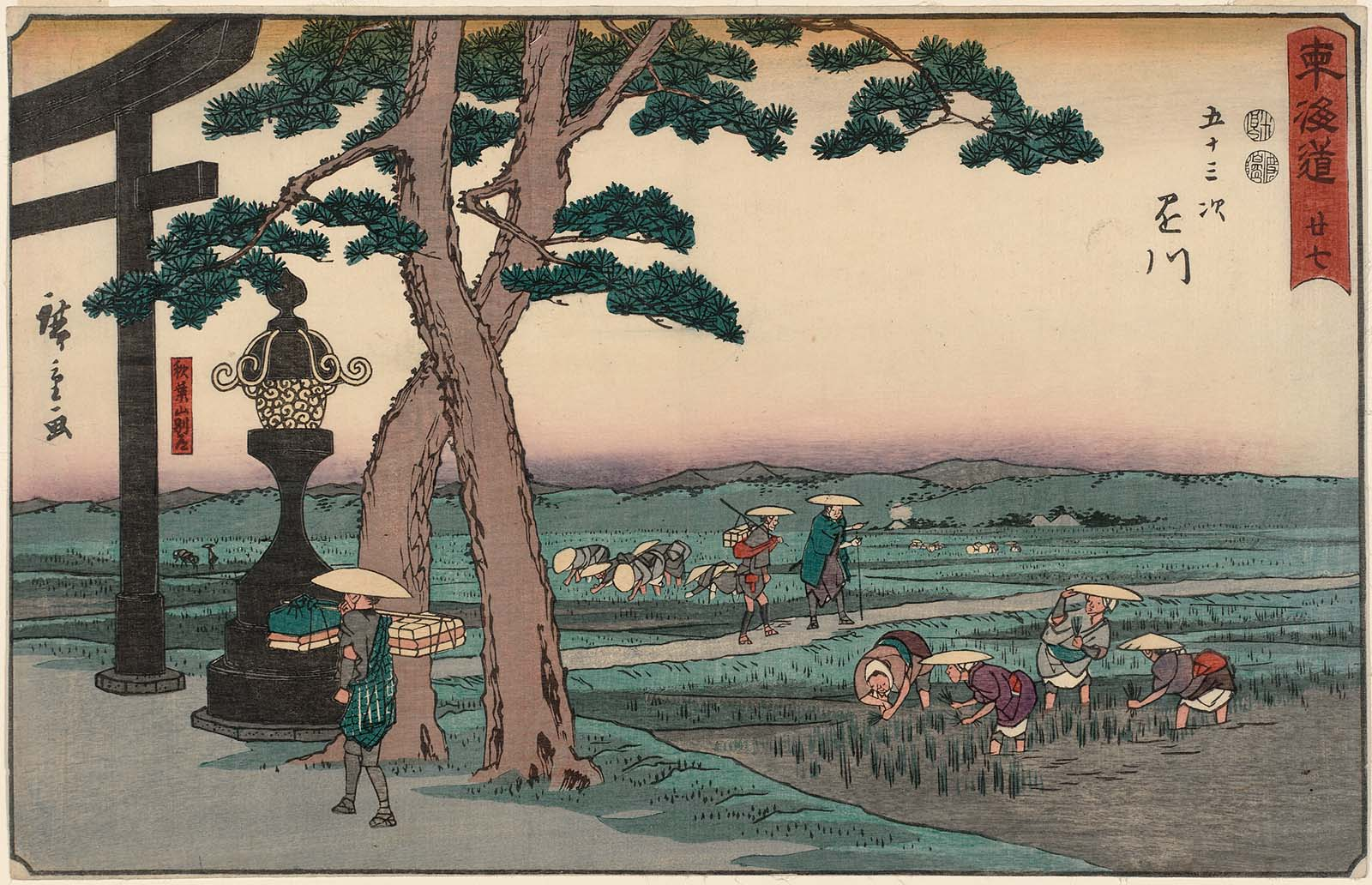
Peasants planting rice

According to Confucian philosophy, society could not survive without agriculture. Life for rural peasants focused on farming in and around their villages. Peasants rarely moved beyond their villages, and journeys and pilgrimages required a permit, but young people occasionally sought seasonal employment outside of their village. As a result, people were highly suspicious of outsiders. Social bonding, critical to the survival of the whole village, was also reinforced through seasonal festivals. Villages were highly collective; there were strong pressures to conform and no room to deviate from custom. Though there were conflicts, they were seen as disruptive to the village and order and were to be limited as much as possible.

The peasant class owned land and were subject to taxation on their harvests by the local daimyō. Peasants worked to produce enough food for themselves and still meet the tax burden. Most agriculture during this time was cultivated by families on their own land in contrast to the plantation or hacienda model implemented elsewhere. The high value of arable land allowed shrewd peasants to enrich themselves. Wealthier families were held in much higher regard and had more political influence in village matters. However, the survival of the village depended on every household cooperating to meet the tax burden and overcome natural disasters such as famines. During the reign of the third shōgun, Tokugawa Iemitsu, farmers were not allowed to eat any of the rice they grew. They had to hand it all over to their daimyō and then wait for him to give some back as charity.

==== Artisans ====
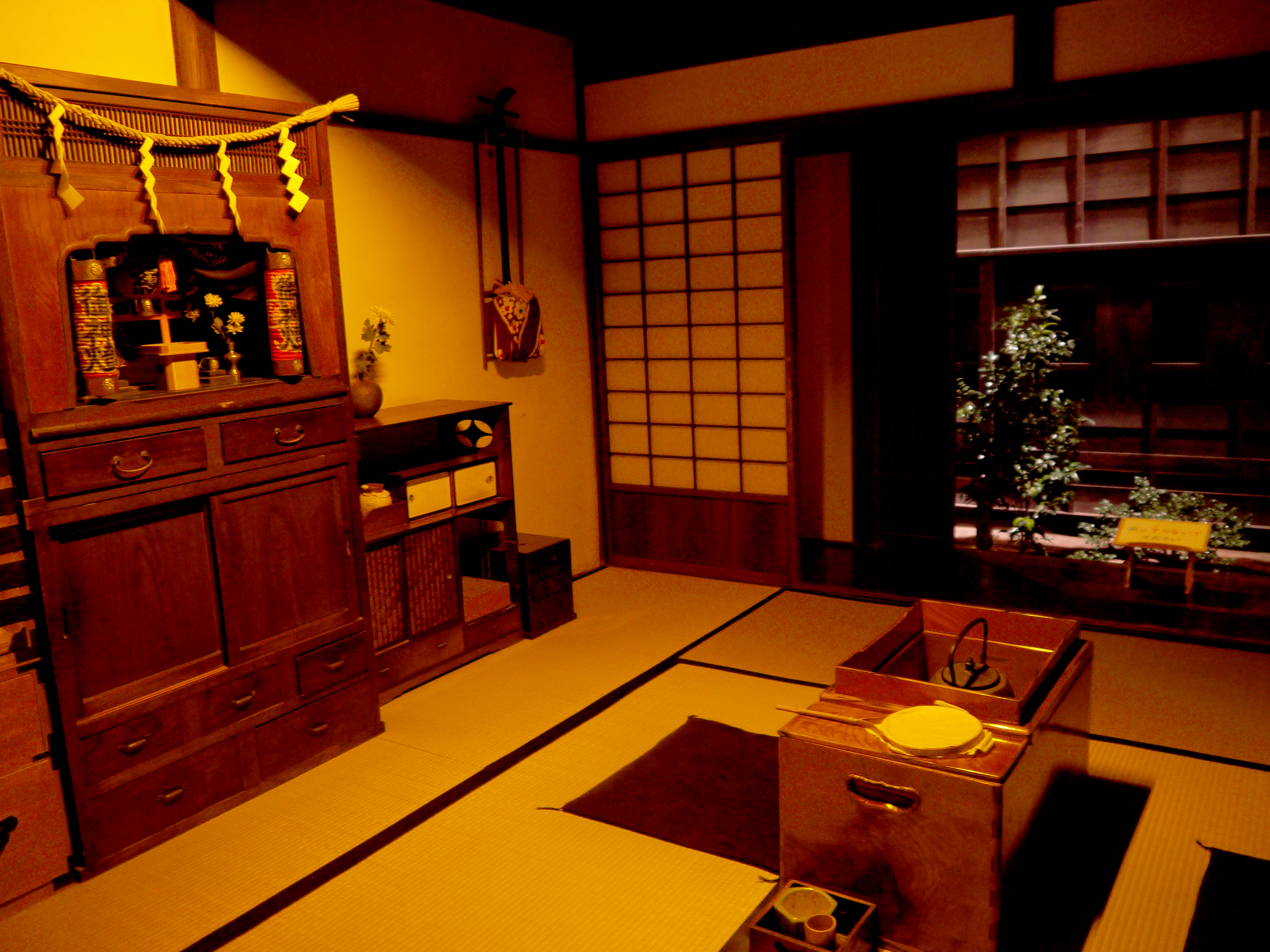
A merchant's house (Fukagawa Edo Museum)

Artisans typically lived in urban areas, and by 1800, as much as 10% of the population of Japan may have lived in large urban areas, one of the highest levels in the world at the time. The daimyō and their samurai did not produce any goods themselves, but they used the tax surplus from the land to fuel their consumption. Their needs were met by artisans, who produced goods such as cookware, clothing, toys for children, writing materials, books, implements for hunting and fishing, and decorative items for household display. Despite their vital role in providing for the ruling class, artisans were forced to reside in a specific quarter around castles and towns.

==== Merchants ====
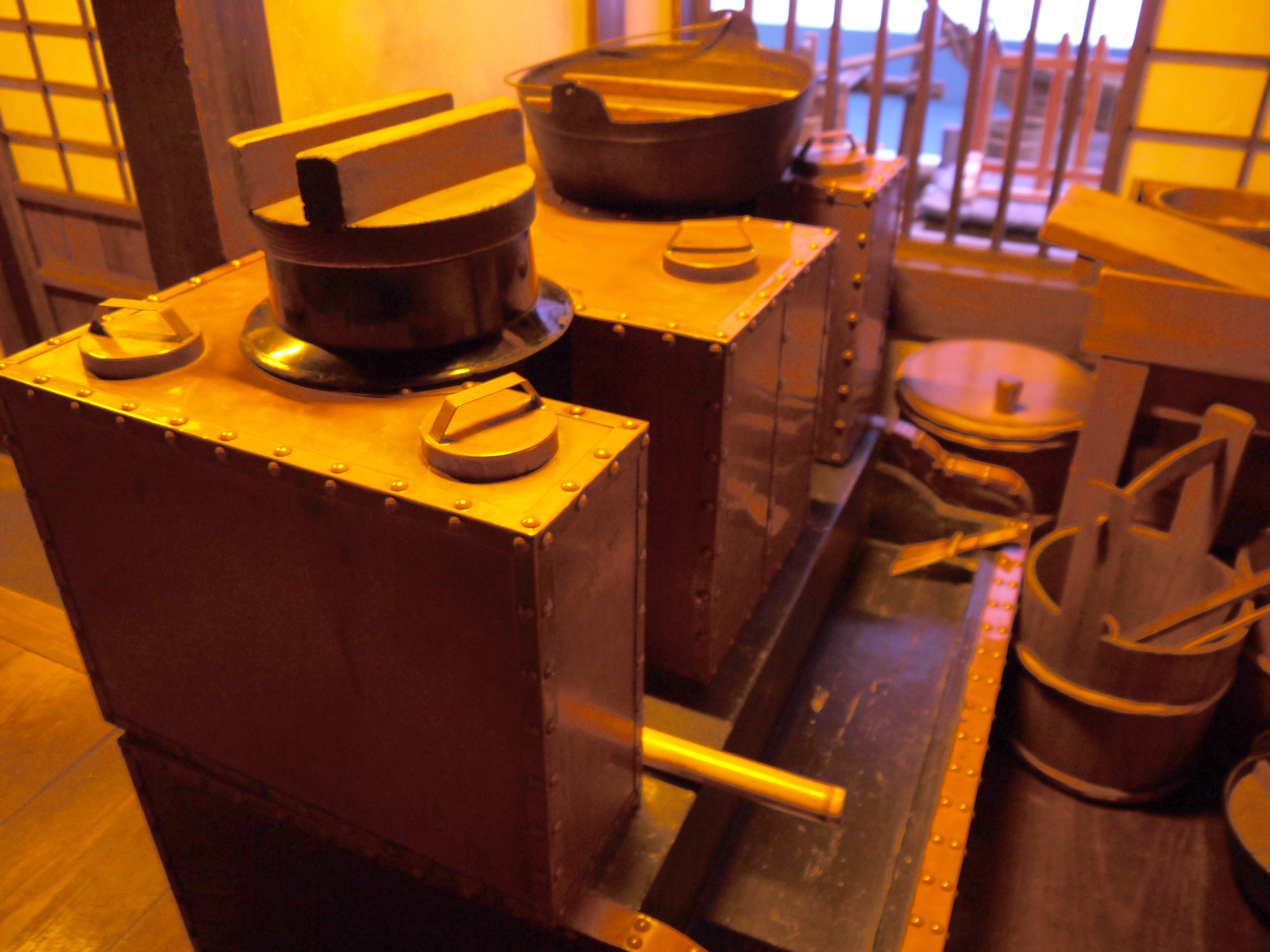
A merchant's kitchen. A stove boiler made of copper (Fukagawa Edo Museum).

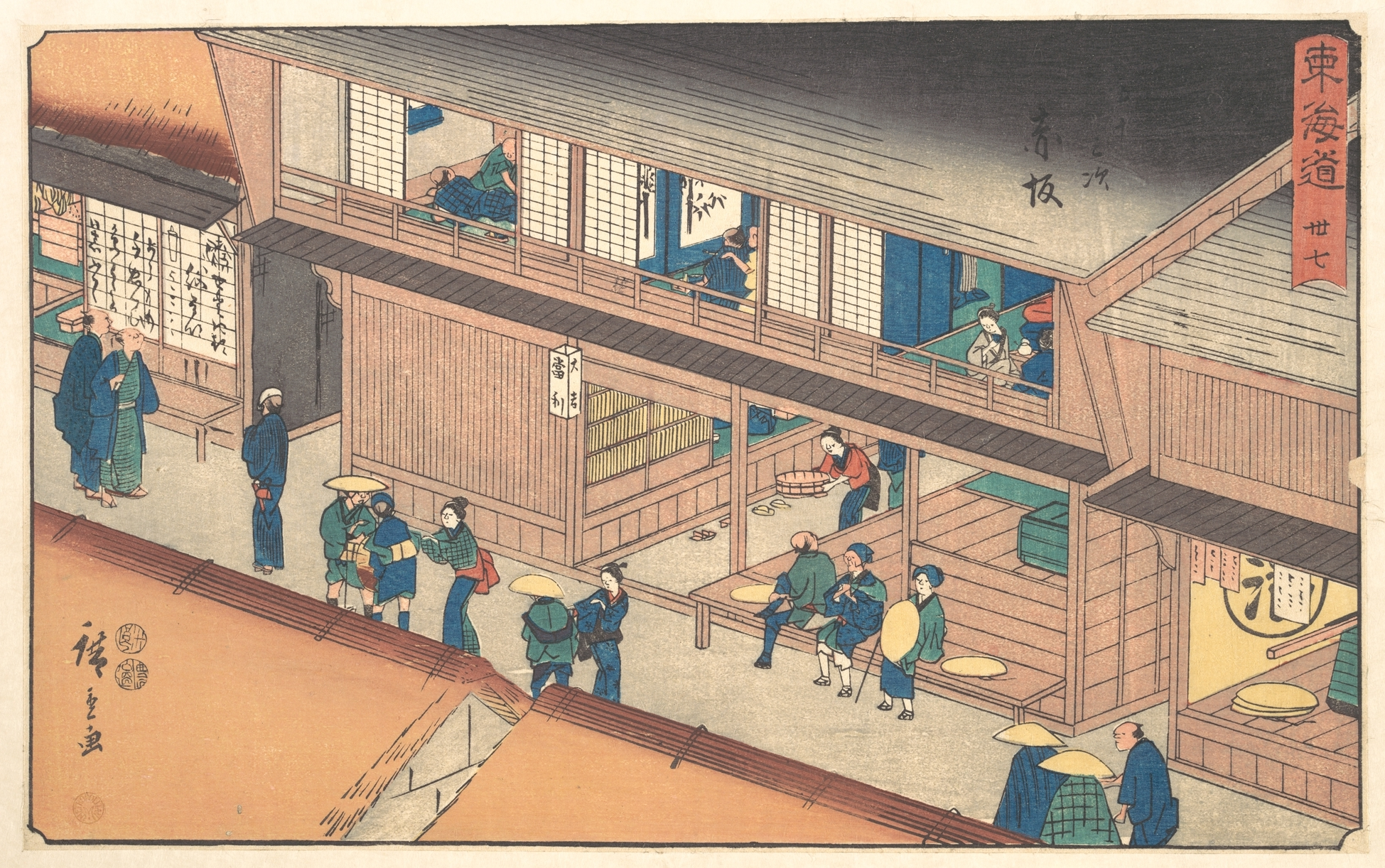
City life in the Edo period

Merchants grew increasingly powerful during the Edo period, in spite of their social standing, and the top merchants commanded a certain amount of respect, with Osaka and later Edo becoming centers of trade and manufacturing.

Wealthy merchant houses emerged as local rulers granted trade monopolies to certain traders and distributors, who in turn paid back part of their profits in taxes. As their wealth grew, merchants wanted to consume and display their wealth in the same manner as the samurai, but the shogun's laws prevented them from doing so overtly. Still, their consumption combined with that of the samurai served to reinforce the growth of the merchant and artisan classes.

=== Untouchables ===
Beneath the four non-aristocratic classes were various communities and levels of outcasts not included within the official Tokugawa class system. These people were "untouchables" who fell outside of mainstream Japanese society for one reason or another, and were actively discriminated against at the societal level.

==== Burakumin ====
The burakumin ('hamlet people/village people' or 'those who live in hamlets/villages') were ethnic Japanese people whose occupations were considered impure or tainted by death, such as executioners, undertakers, slaughterhouse workers, butchers, and tanners. These occupations were seen to be kegare (穢れ, 'defilement') in the Shinto religion. In the Edo period, the social stigma of being a burakumin developed into a hereditary status, with the children of burakumin forced to practice the same occupations as their parents, generation after generation.

Although technically commoners, the burakumin were victims of severe ostracism. Under the shogun's laws, they were required to live only in isolated, poverty-stricken villages that were essentially ghettos.

==== Ethnic minorities ====
Ethnic minorities in Japan were generally excluded from the class system, though certain individuals in service of the shōgun or daimyō were included. The Tokugawa isolationist policy of sakoku banned most foreigners from entering Japan, and those who were caught (even survivors of foreign shipwrecks seeking aid) were often put to death.

== Role of women ==
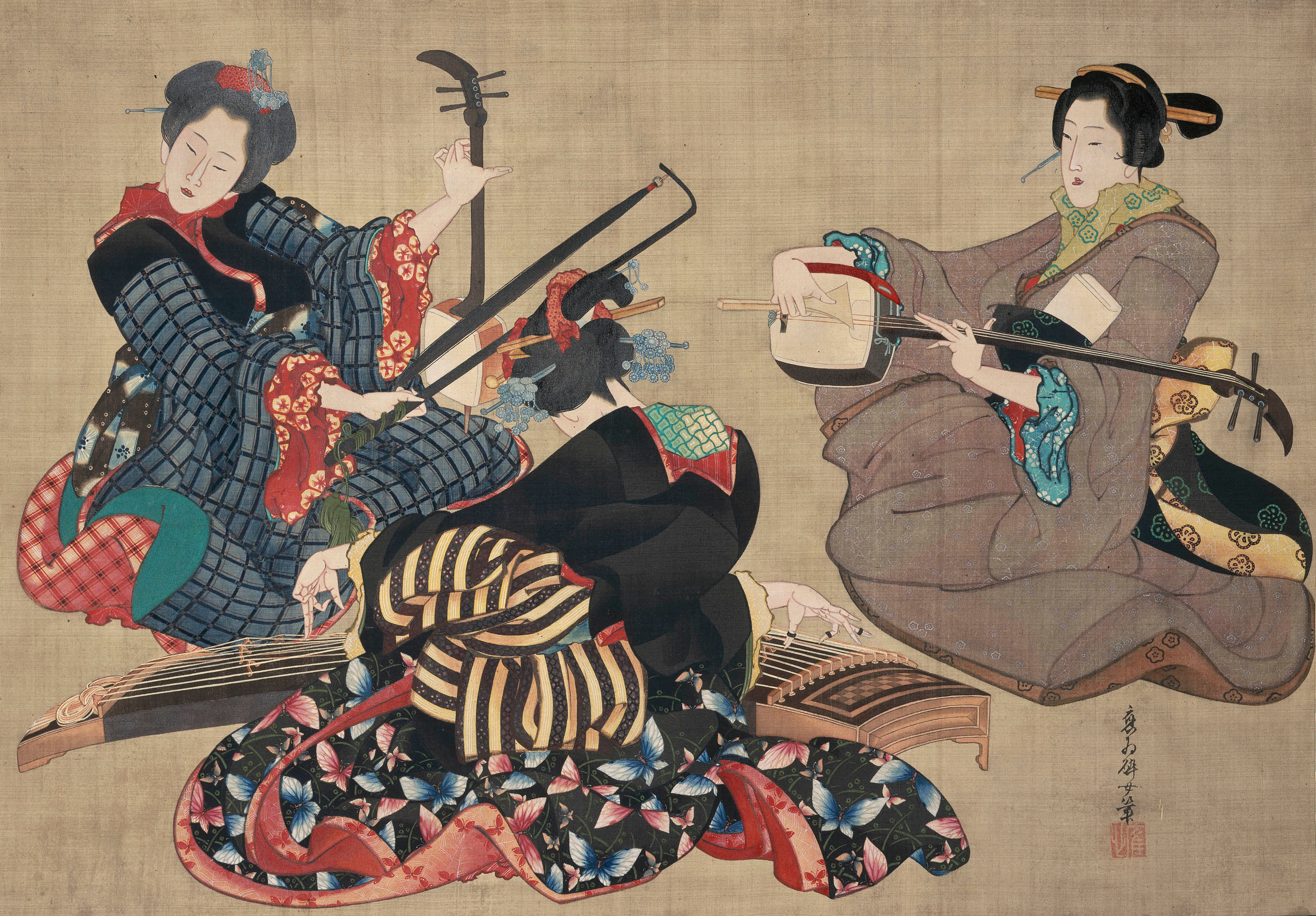
Three Women Playing Musical Instruments, by Katsushika Ōi

A Japanese woman's life varied immensely according to her family's social status. Women in samurai families were expected to submit to their male heads of household, but as they aged, they could become the ranking household member if their husband died. Children were taught to respect both of their parents, even as adults. Women from the lower classes were much less restricted by social expectations and could play an integral part in the family's business. Peasant women were expected to do household chores in the early morning before working in the fields with their male relatives and, regardless of age, were important, working members of their families.

Marriage was not based on romantic attraction. Families tried to use marriage as a way to increase their social standing or, among wealthier groups, to increase one's influence and holdings. Most often, however, marriage occurred between two families of equal status. Female virginity at marriage was important in the samurai classes; it was much less important to the lower classes. After marriage, women were restricted from taking additional sexual partners. Males of the upper classes, however, were able to take concubines and have relations with unmarried women. Divorce was common, and a woman from a poor household could very easily leave her husband and return to her original family.

== Decline ==
The foundation of Edo society was its stable social order, but changes to Japanese society over the next two centuries began to undermine the Tokugawa system. Increasing urbanization and rising consumerism saw wealth become concentrated outside of the samurai class, and their fixed stipends did not increase despite the rising cost of commodities. The increasingly burdensome cost of proper social etiquette led many samurai to become indebted to wealthy urban merchant families. The merchants, in turn, were denied any say in how they were governed, could not openly display their wealth, and were considered socially inferior to the samurai. That created deepening resentment but also increased interdependence between the two classes.

Some Japanese scholars began to question the Confucian beliefs that provided the foundation of Edo society. Additionally, numerous changes in rural areas altered the standing of low-ranking peasants. New technology which increased productivity allowed some peasant families to produce a surplus of food, creating a disposable income that could be used to support ventures beyond farming. Others lost their land or possessions as they went into debt with moneylenders and wealthier neighbors. This sparked resentment that sometimes erupted into violence towards landlords and the village elite.

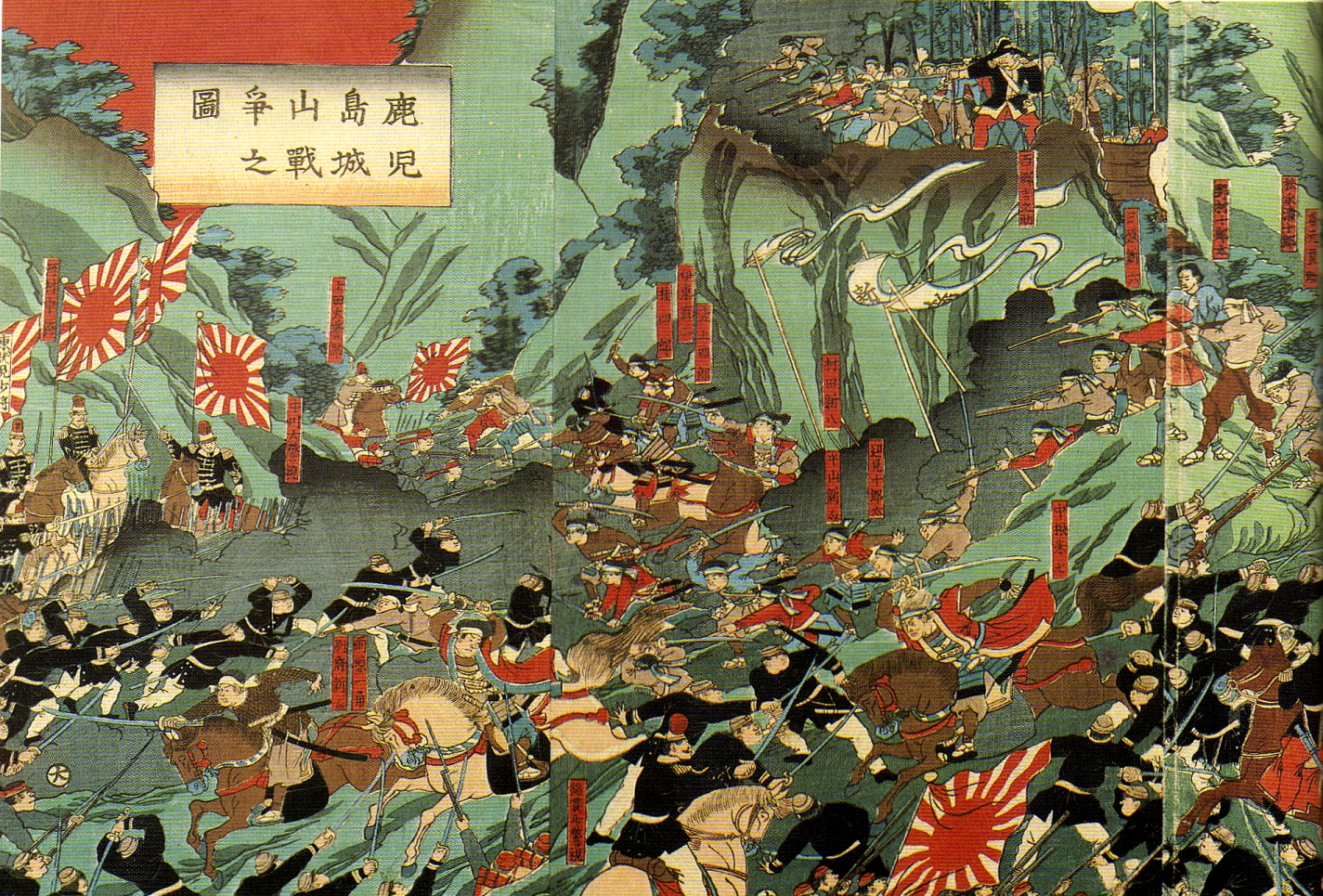
The defeat at the Battle of Shiroyama in 1877 effectively ended the samurai class.

In 1853, the beginning of the bakumatsu saw Edo society increasingly questioned by Japanese people when Western powers used their technological superiority to force concessions from the Tokugawa in the Unequal treaties. Many Japanese people, including members of the samurai, began to blame the Tokugawa for Japan's "backwardness" and subsequent humiliation. A modernization movement which advocated the abolition of feudalism and return of power to the Imperial Court eventually overthrew the Tokugawa Shogunate in the Meiji Restoration in 1868.

The new Meiji government of the Empire of Japan soon abolished the Tokugawa class system that had characterized Edo society. The kuge and daimyo classes were merged into the kazoku aristocratic class with class privileges which formed the Meiji oligarchy. Most remaining samurai that did not become kazoku were designated as shizoku, a distinct class without class privileges that was purely a title on the government register. Commoners and the burakumin were merged into a single commoner class without restrictions or distinction for their occupation, though burakumin continued to face discrimination similar to Edo society.
