= Edo-Tokyo Museum =

Historical museum in Tokyo, Japan

Coordinates: 35°41′47.05″N 139°47′45.97″E

- 江戸東京博物館
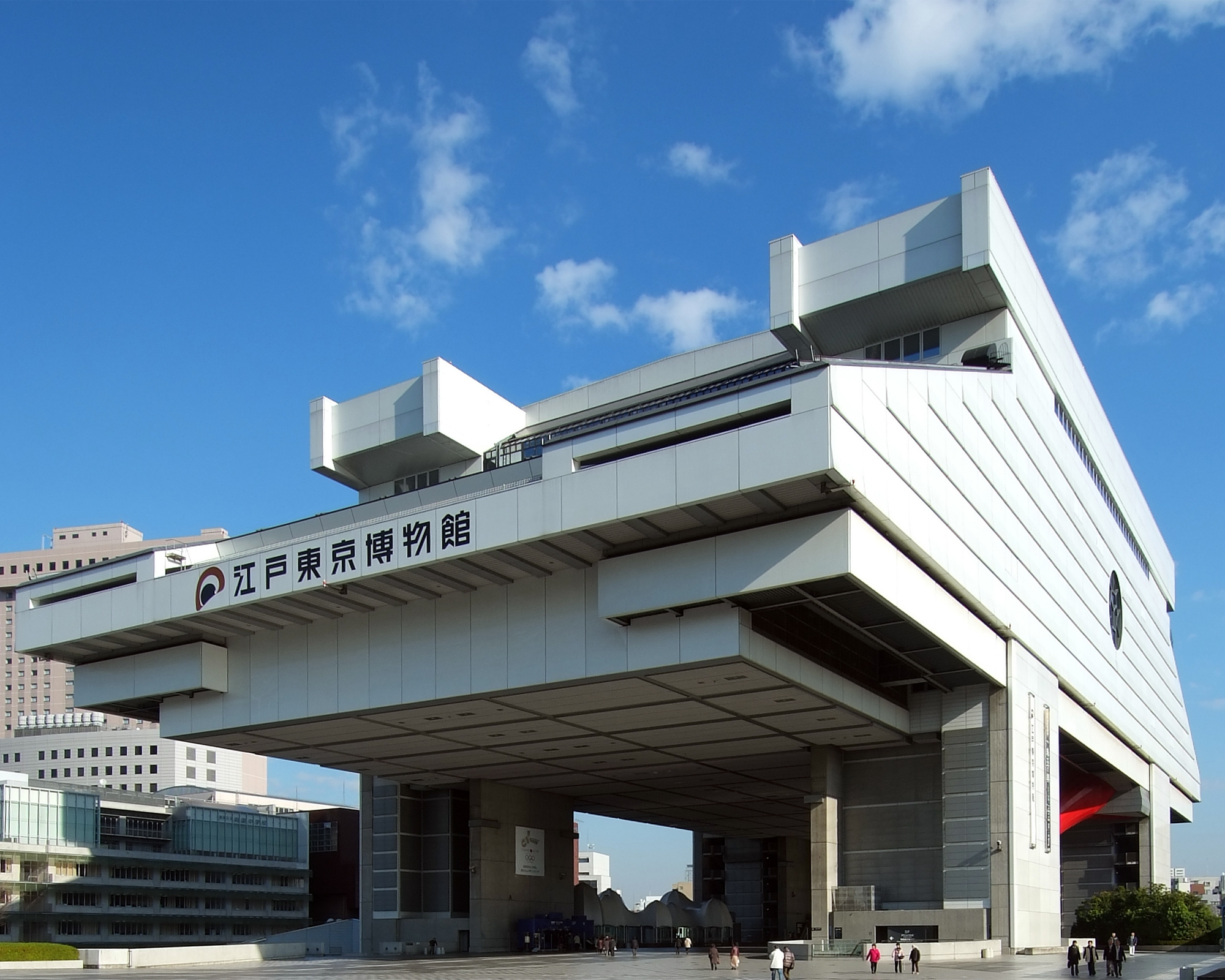
- Entrance of the Museum
- Established: 1993; 33 years ago
- Location: 1-4-1 Yokoami, Sumida, Tokyo, Japan
- Visitors: 1,876,205 (2015)
- Website: www.edo-tokyo-museum.or.jp/en/

The Edo-Tokyo Museum (江戸東京博物館, Edo Tōkyō Hakubutsukan) is a historical museum located at 1-4-1 Yokoami, Sumida-Ku, Tokyo in the Ryogoku district. The museum opened in March 1993 to preserve Edo's cultural heritage, and features city models of Edo and Tokyo between 1590 (just prior to the Edo period beginning) and 1964. It was the first museum built dedicated to the history of Tokyo. Some main features of the permanent exhibitions are the life-size replica of the Nihonbashi, which was the bridge leading into Edo; scale models of towns and buildings across the Edo, Meiji, and Shōwa periods; and the Nakamura-za theatre.

Designed by Kiyonori Kikutake, the building is 62.2 meters tall and covers 30,000 square meters. The concrete exterior is designed based on a traditional rice storehouse (takayuka-shiki style) and is the same height as the Edo Castle. Kikutake claimed that the building "crystallizes Japanese culture in built form," concerning the structure's traditional references but contemporary execution. There are eight floors, one below ground and seven elevated off the ground by four columns, with an open air plaza at ground level. The first floor has a museum shop, restaurants, and a ticket counter. The primary entrance is on the third floor, reached by a bright red escalator from the plaza. The fifth and sixth floors contain permanent exhibits, with temporary special and feature exhibits on the first and fifth floors. The seventh floor is a library that houses 560,000 texts and cultural items related to Edo and Tokyo.

The museum opened thirteen years after the Shitamachi Museum and six years after the Fukagawa Edo Museum, all part of a national trend for building local history museums. The exhibits for all three were primarily designed by Total Media.

Formerly owned and operated by the Tokyo Metropolitan Government, the Edo-Tokyo Museum is accented by the Edo-Tokyo Open Air Architectural Museum across the city in Koganei Park. The Edo-Tokyo Museum is now operated by the Tokyo Metropolitan Foundation for History and Culture.

The museum was closed for a four-year renovation beginning in April 2022, and reopened on March 31, 2026.

== Design and Architecture ==
Kikutake was selected as the architect through a closed competition conducted by the Tokyo city hall. Kikutake designed the Metabolist structure with the goal of projecting Japan as a nation and culture, with Tokyo specifically as a world city. The organization that directed the museum, Total Media, led by Ogi Shinzo, wanted to use the museum to define Japan through the everyday life of shomin (庶民), or average citizens. Emporis classifies the $300 million structure as a high-rise building.

The concept of an Edo-Tokyo Museum was imagined in the early 1980s by Tokyo governor Suzuki Shun'ichi as part of the Expo' 70 tenth anniversary campaign "My Town Tokyo." Nine companies were involved with the museum's construction, organized by Kajima Corporation. The site location was chosen mainly because the Ukiyo-e painter Katsushika Hokusai was born in the Sumida ward, and Edo culture was born and flourished in Ryogoku.

Kyoto roofs reflecting sunlight inspired the whitish silver color of the outside. Likewise, the roof-like shape that defines the building derives from the distinctive roofs of old Japanese temples. The roofs of these monuments, Kikutake says, differentiate them from other structures while simultaneously cohering with the landscape. The four legs were erected first, followed by the cantilevers. The first elevated floor is supported on the legs' 19.7' deep bottom chords, while a second set of chords supports the other floors. Each of the four composite steel with reinforced concrete legs is a 46' deep "H" shape. From the plaza to the first raised floor, they are 63' tall. The building is cantilevered 119' over the legs on the North and South sides. Fluorine resin-coated square panels cover the building.

To protect the artifacts from vibrations and earthquakes, 126 springs are positioned throughout the overhang capable of absorbing 3.5 inches of vertical movement. During the 2011 Tohoku earthquake, however, the seventh floor Edo-Tokyo Museum Library reported that shelves became unstable and books fell.

The museum was closed on 2022 as part of its first major renovation due to aging air-conditioning systems and deteriorating interior and exterior facilities. It reopened on March 31, 2026.

== 2026 reopening and exhibitions ==
The museum reopened on March 31, 2026, following its first major renovation since its opening in 1993. Building facilities were upgraded, including the renewal of aging waterproofing systems, interior and exterior finishes, and air conditioning equipment. To improve energy efficiency, all interior lighting was replaced with LED fixtures, and solar power generation systems and motion sensor-based equipment were introduced. Along the approach to the museum, twenty-four red installations were added. As visitors proceed further along the route, digital displays within these installations present imagery from periods increasingly closer to the Edo era, creating a gradual transition into its historical setting.

The permanent exhibition spans the sixth and fifth floors. Visitors enter the exhibition on the sixth floor, where a full-scale model of Nihonbashi, presented in a shortened form, serves as the central feature. Exhibits continue beyond the bridge, including galleries located past a white curtain. Digital screens were newly installed along the upper walls of the sixth floor, projecting imagery of the skies of Edo and modern Tokyo and creating a unified visual setting in harmony with features such as the Nakamura-za theater, the clock tower of Hattori Tokeiten (present-day Seiko), and the Nihonbashi model. The exhibition extends down to the fifth floor, where the Edo Zone is located on the left side beneath the bridge and the Tokyo Zone on the right. Following the renovation, visitors are now able to enter certain full-scale reconstruction models, including those of the Nakamura-za theater and a typical townspeople's (chōnin) residence. In addition, the model of the Choya Shimbun company building was replaced with that of the clock tower of Hattori Tokeiten, reflecting the historical transition of the actual site. New architectural models were also added, including structures such as the gate of Hanayashiki amusement park in Asakusa from the early 20th century. Multilingual guidance is also available via QR codes that can be scanned with smartphones, providing information on exhibits in 13 languages.

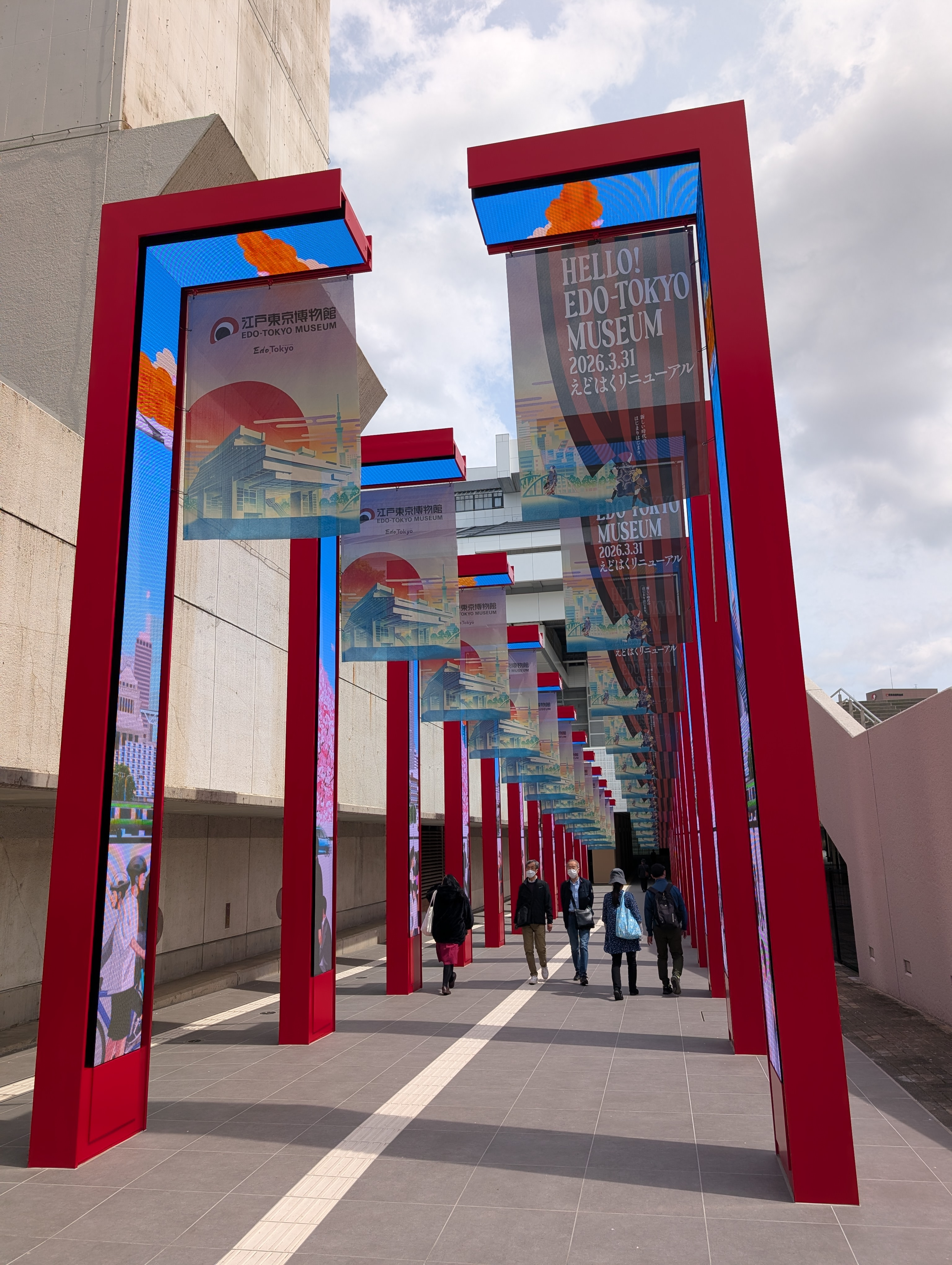
Approach corridor leading to the museum entrance

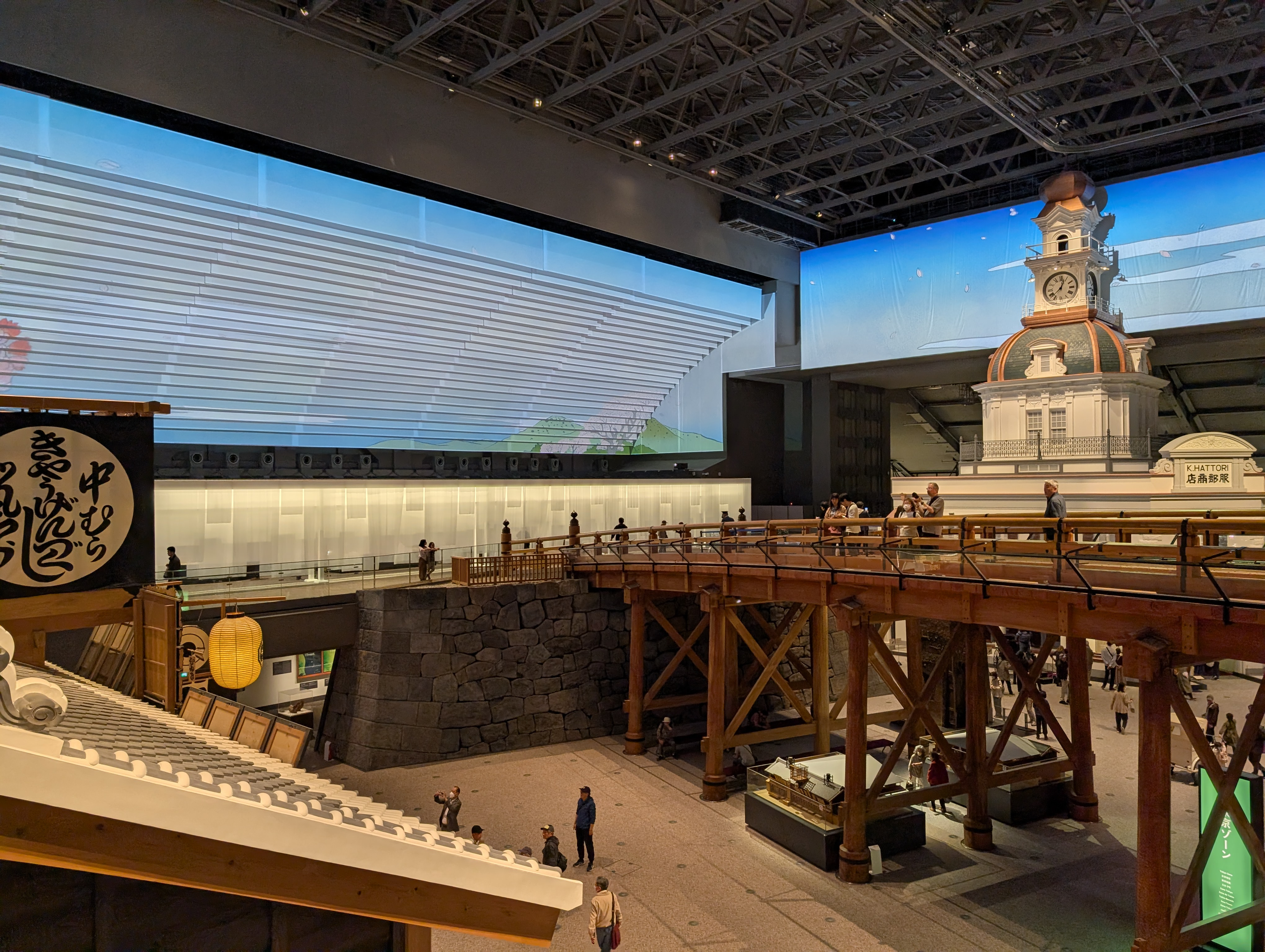
View from the entrance to the permanent exhibition on the 6th floor, crossing a partial reconstruction of Nihonbashi and passing through a white curtain into the gallery

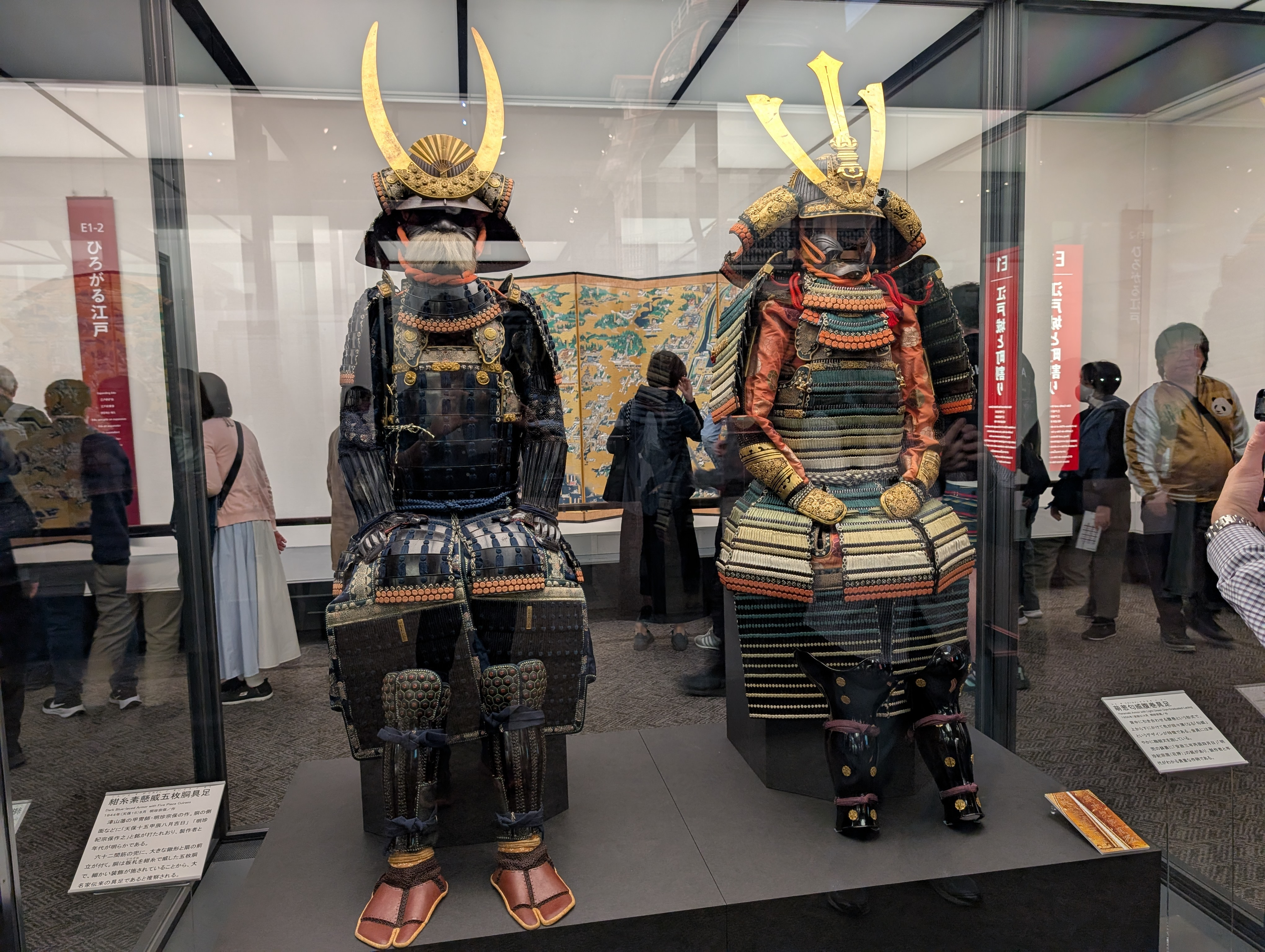
Samurai armor from the Edo period

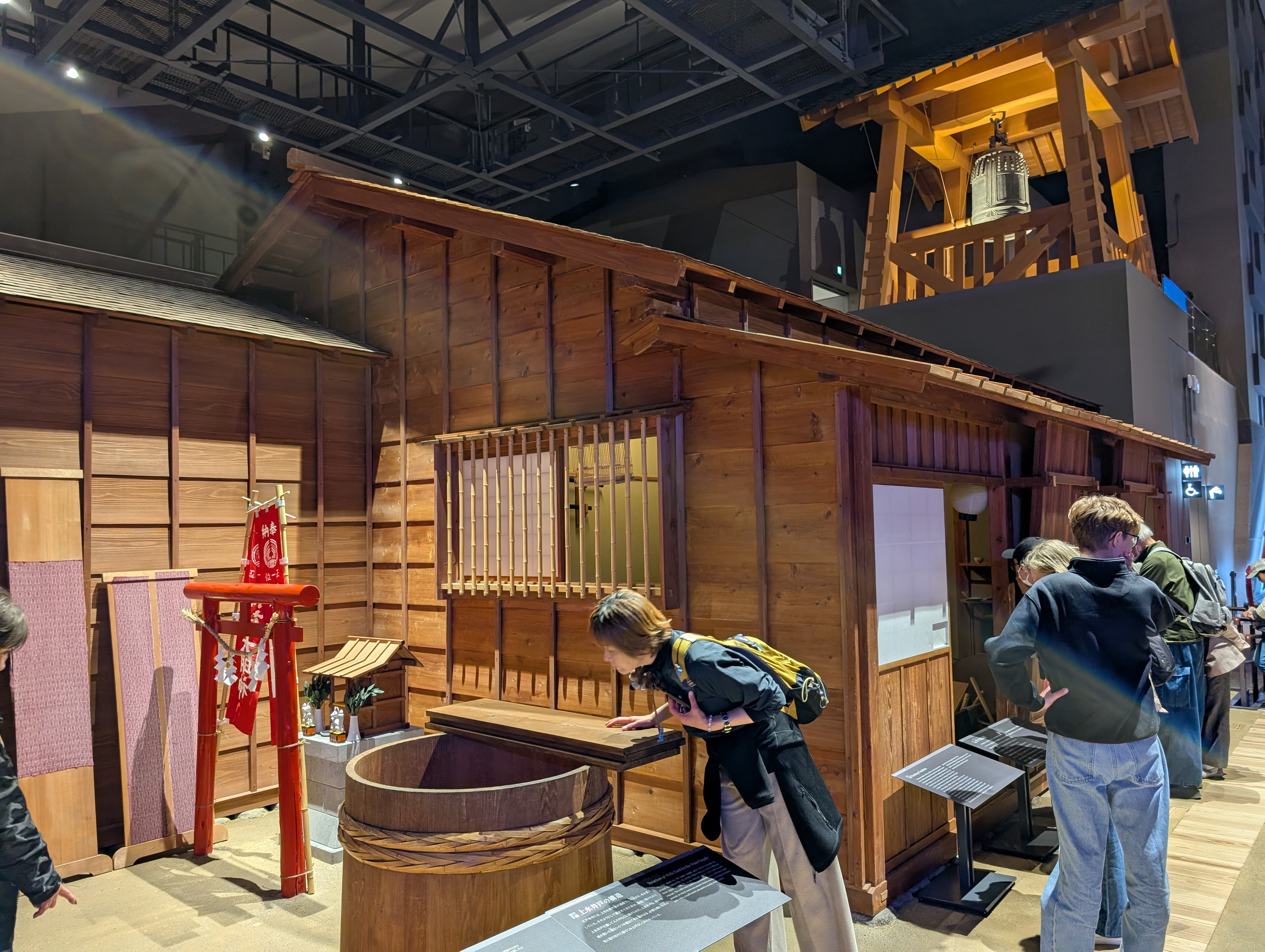
Reconstruction model of a common townspeople's (chōnin) residence in Edo

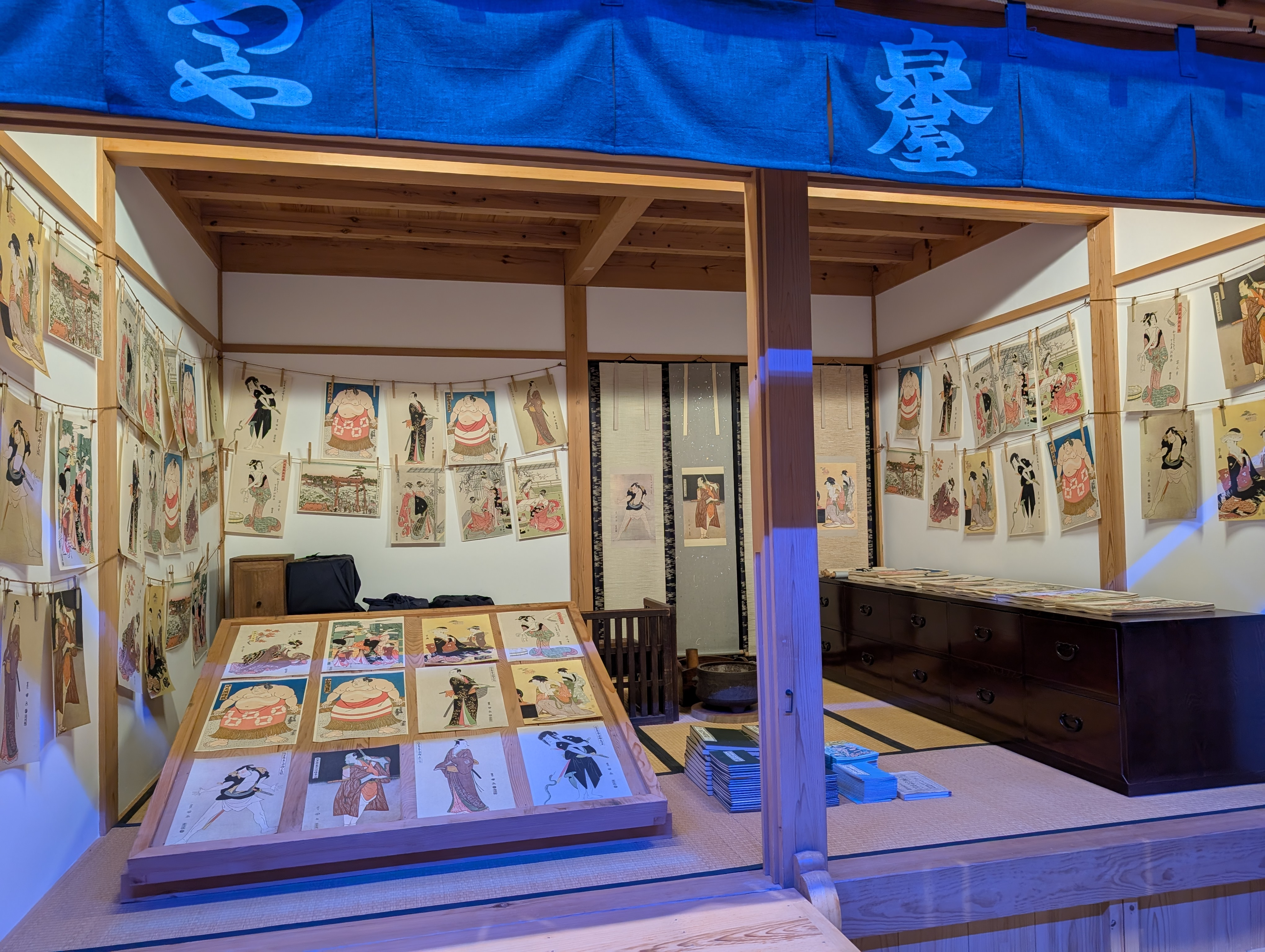
Reconstruction model of a ukiyo-e print shop

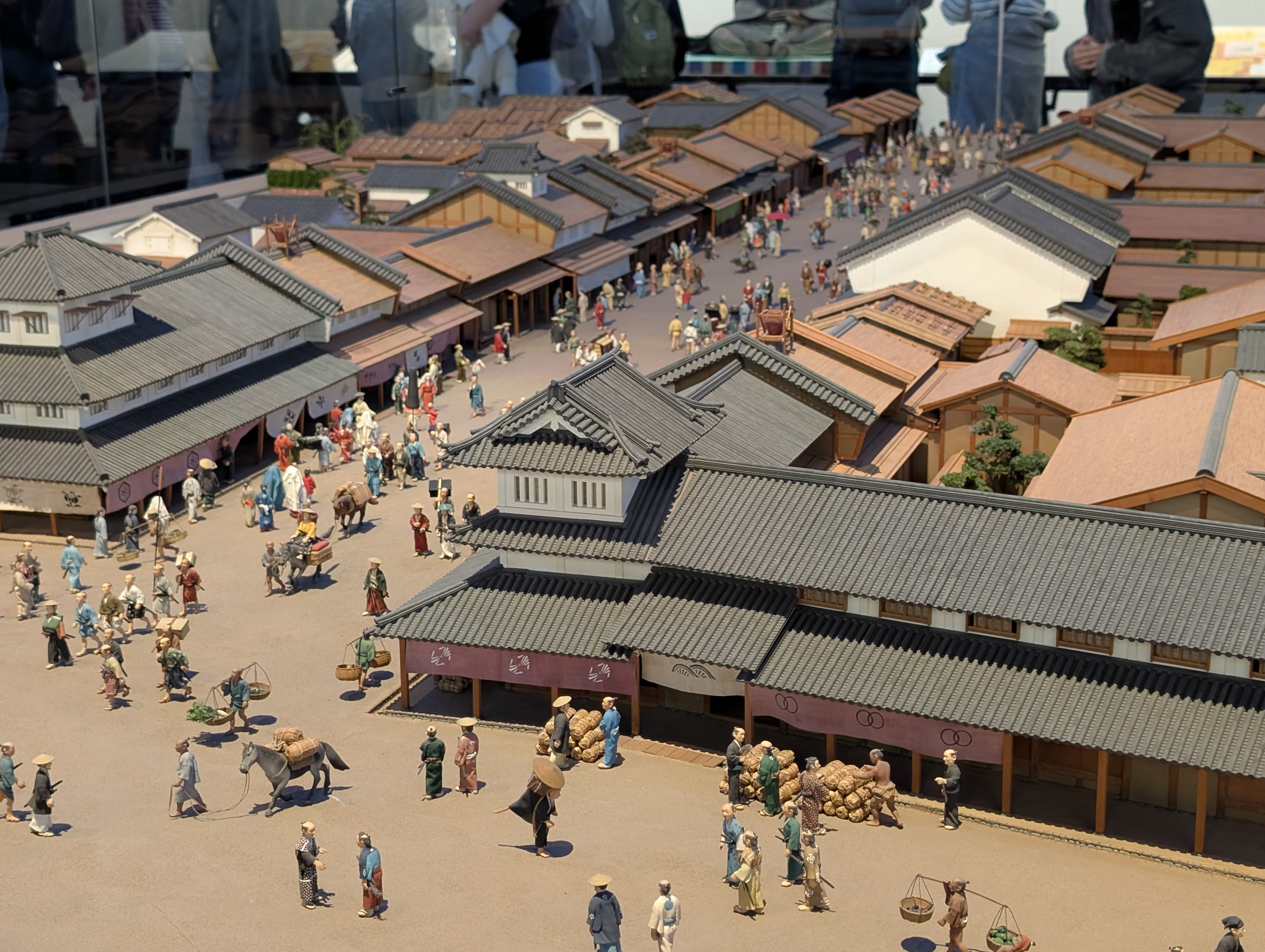
Scale model of the streets of Edo

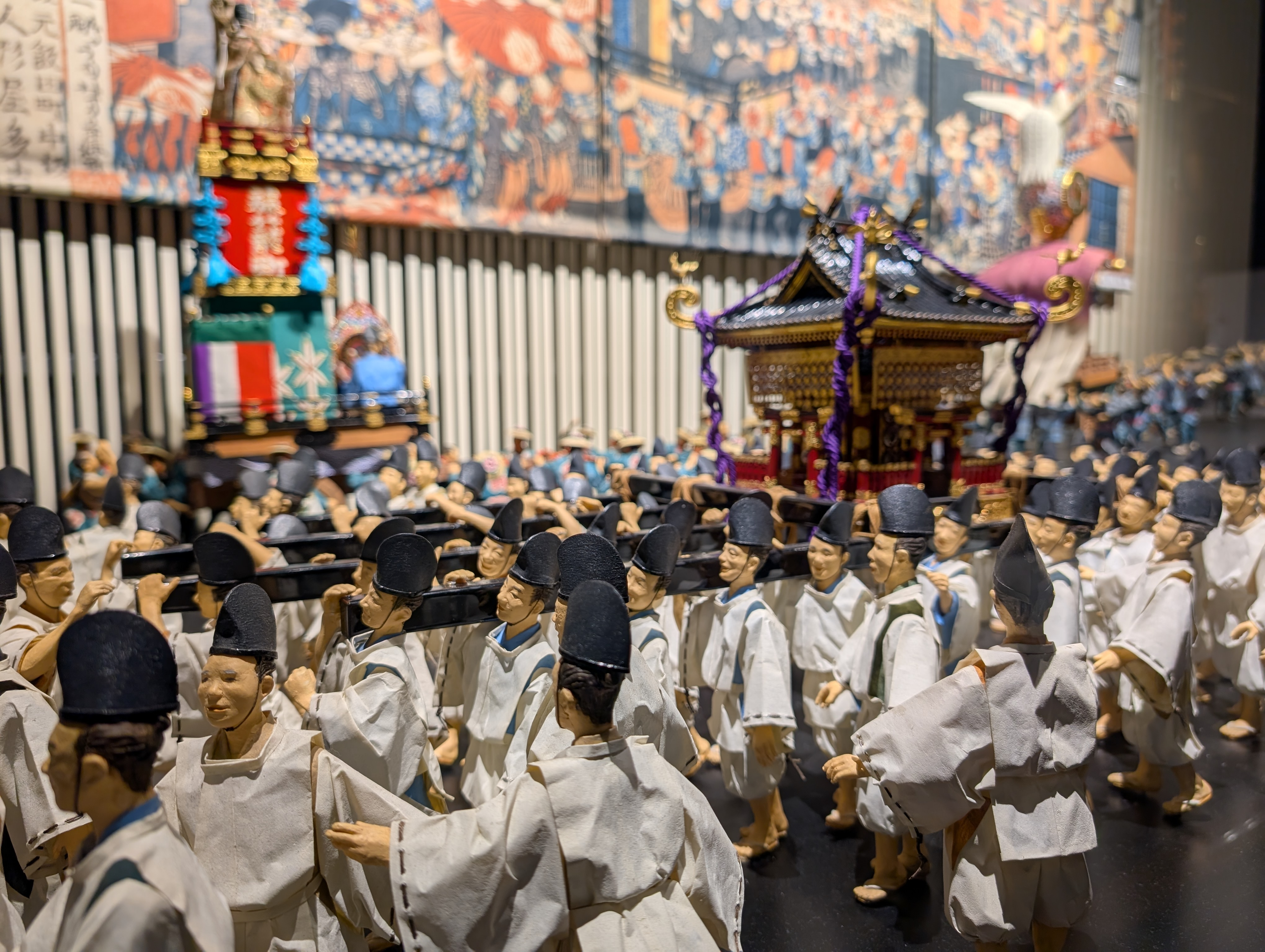
Scale model depicting a festival at Kanda Shrine

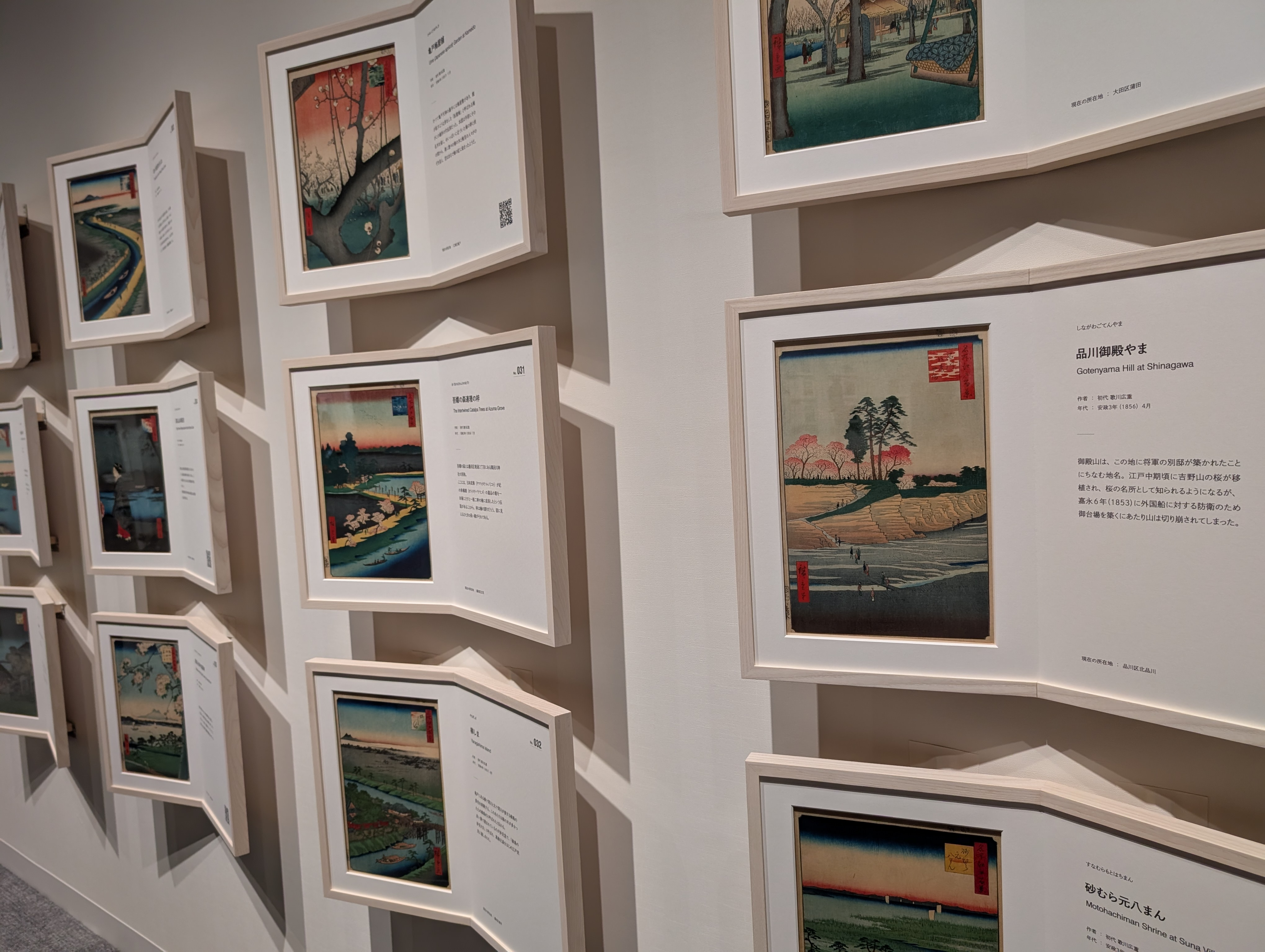
One Hundred Famous Views of Edo by Utagawa Hiroshige

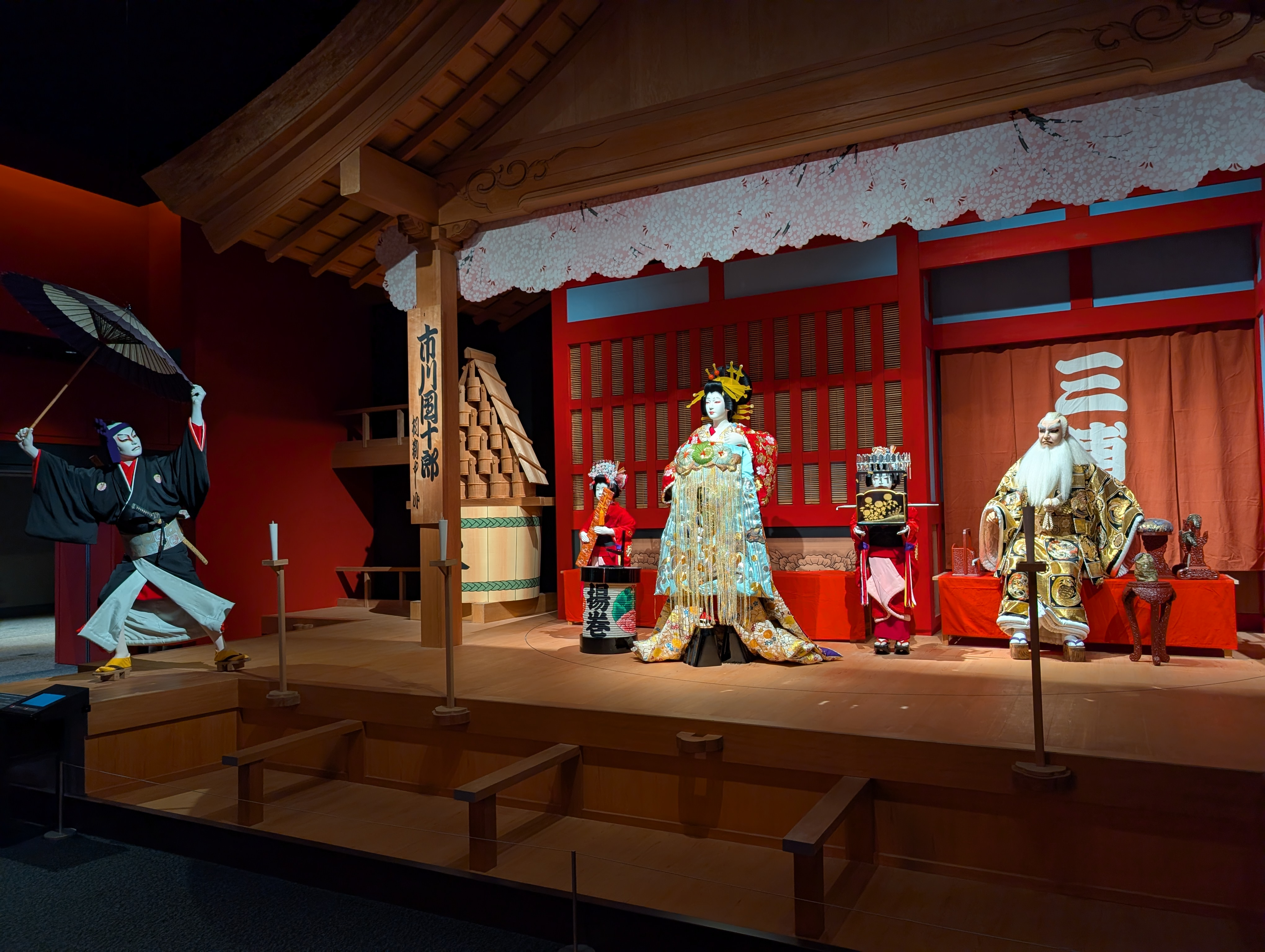
Scene from the kabuki play Sukeroku

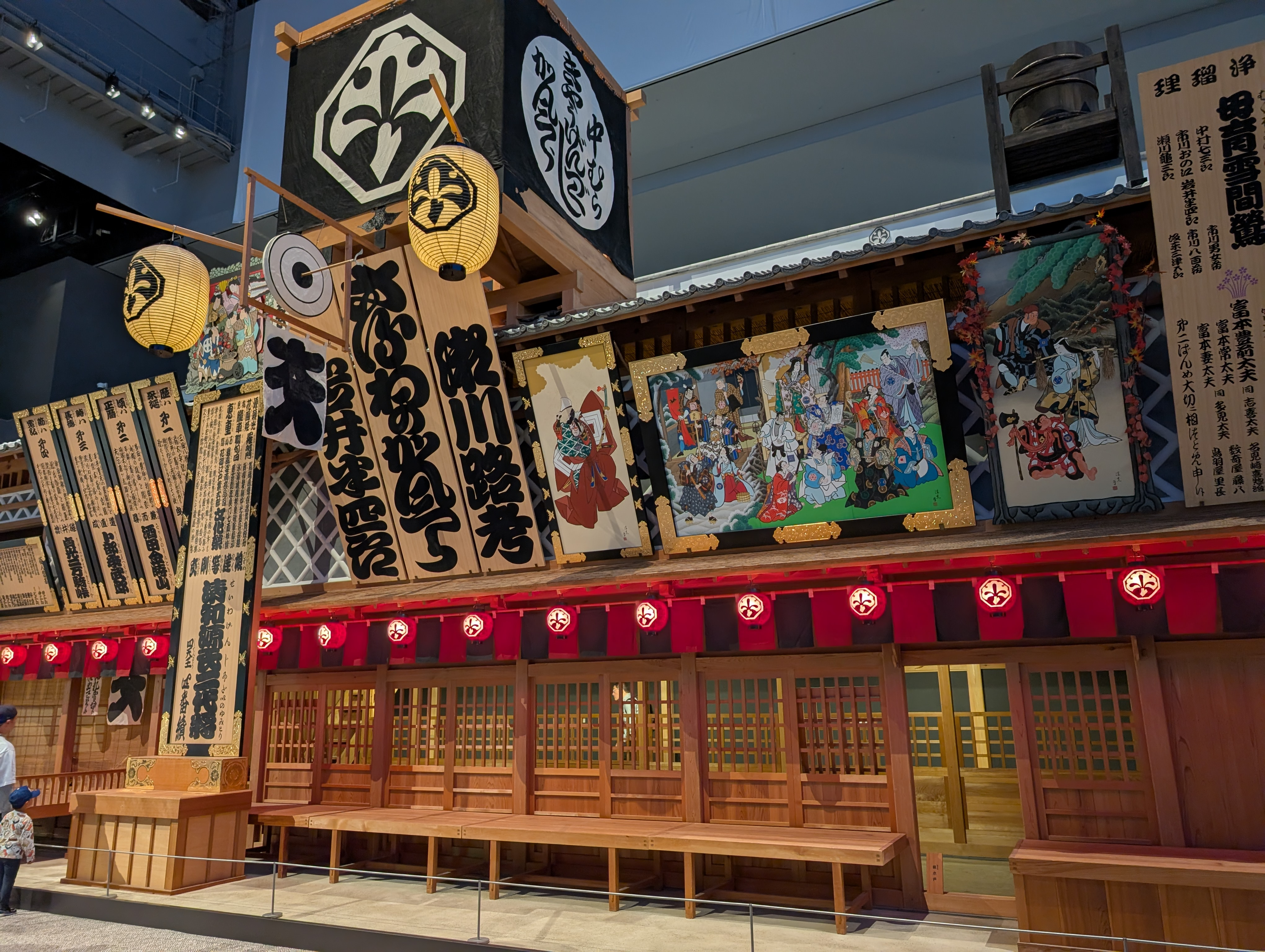
Reconstruction model of the Nakamura-za kabuki theater

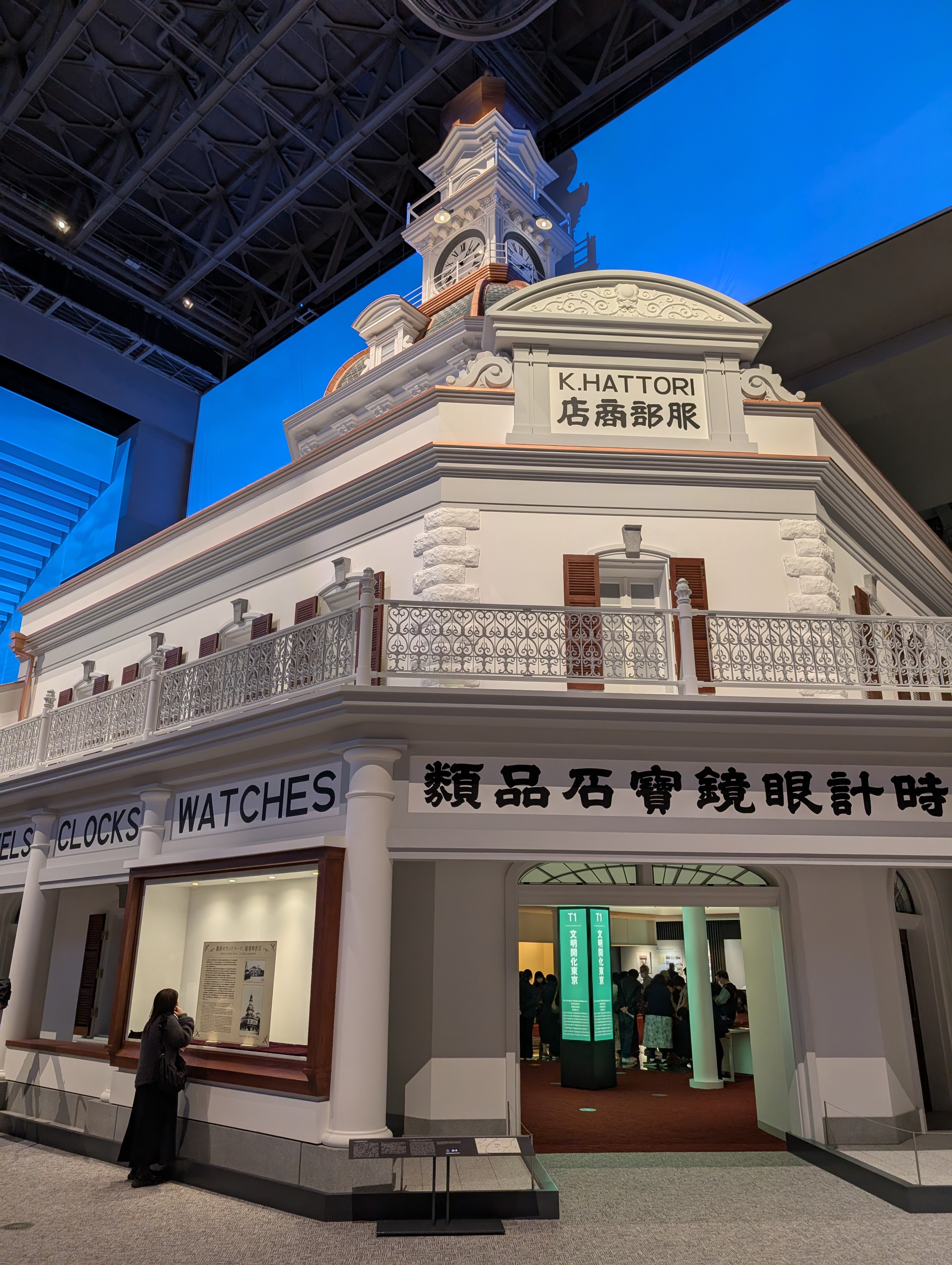
Reconstruction model of the clock tower of Hattori Tokeiten (present-day Seiko)

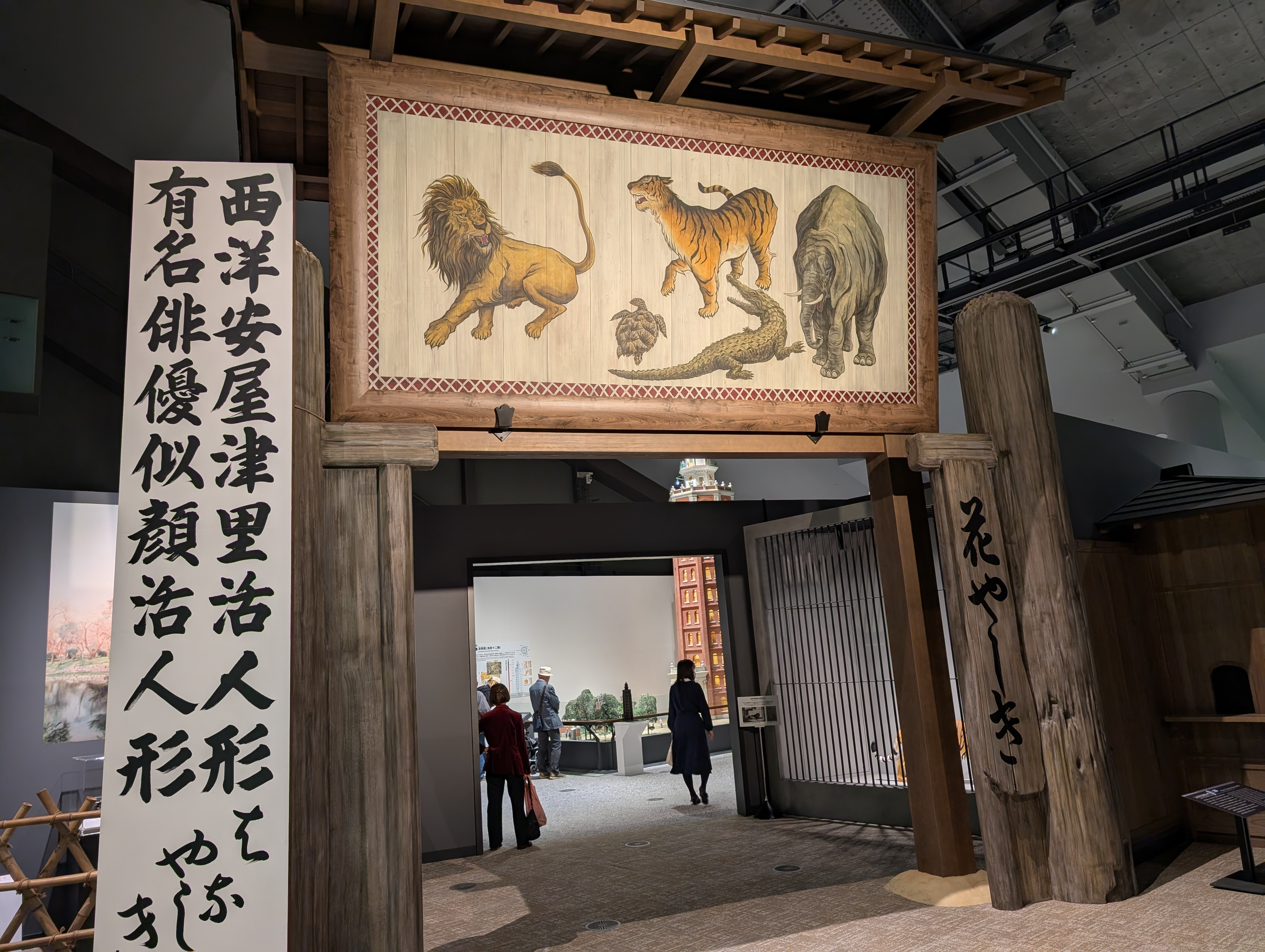
Reconstruction model of the gate of Hanayashiki in Asakusa in the early 1900s

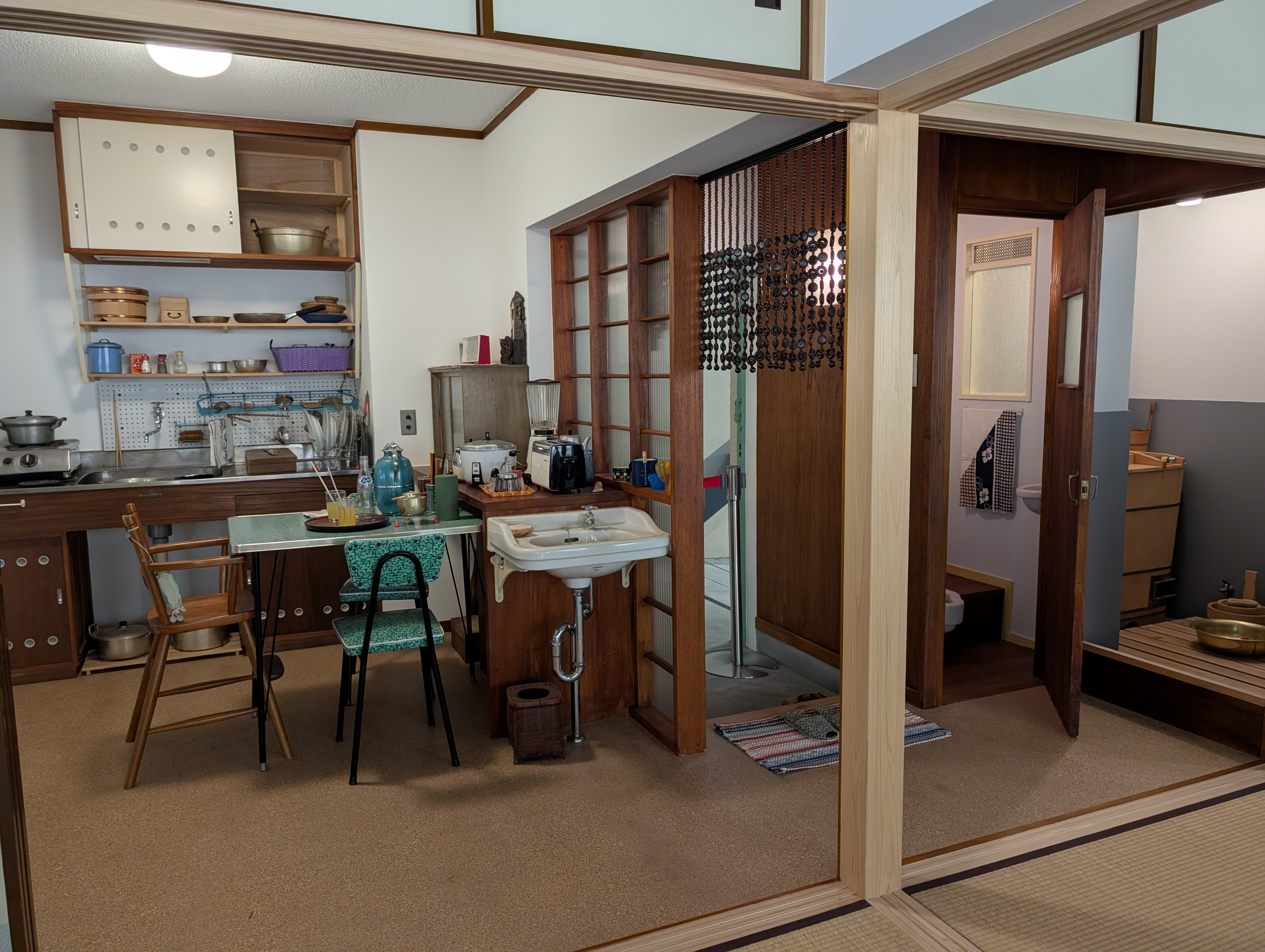
Housing for ordinary people in Tokyo during the period of high economic growth

== Reception ==
While most of the museum's initial reception focused on the exhibits, the building itself garnered general praise in its role in housing the exhibits. William Steele notes that "the building itself is playful," comparing it to a creature from space. Carol Lutfy observes that "the museum embraces the odd blend of history and high-tech that has come to characterize modern-day Tokyo." She argues that the structure serves as a conduit between tradition and contemporary, just as the museum itself does. The museum website claims that the building has architecturally defined the area and attracted tourists due to its unique form.

The unique form of the building, however, has been a source of criticism as well. As the dominant structure in the Ryogoku district, the Edo-Tokyo Museum dwarfs and arguably does not blend with the stylings of the area. Of the nearby structures, only the Ryogoku Kokugikan has similar dimensions, but it is not nearly as visible.

Steele argues that while the interior is well suited for the exhibits, the artificial divide it creates between Edo and Tokyo is problematic. The permanent exhibit floor ignores the continuity between Edo and Tokyo periods, Steele claims, because the floor plan divides the rooms into two divergent spaces.

Barrie Shelton argues that the building is distinctly Japanese in its monumentality and "visually self-contained", focusing more attention on the plaza below and its connection to the building, than the building itself.

== See also ==
- Japanese Instrument of Surrender § Current locations
