= Shitamachi Museum =

Museum in Tokyo, Japan

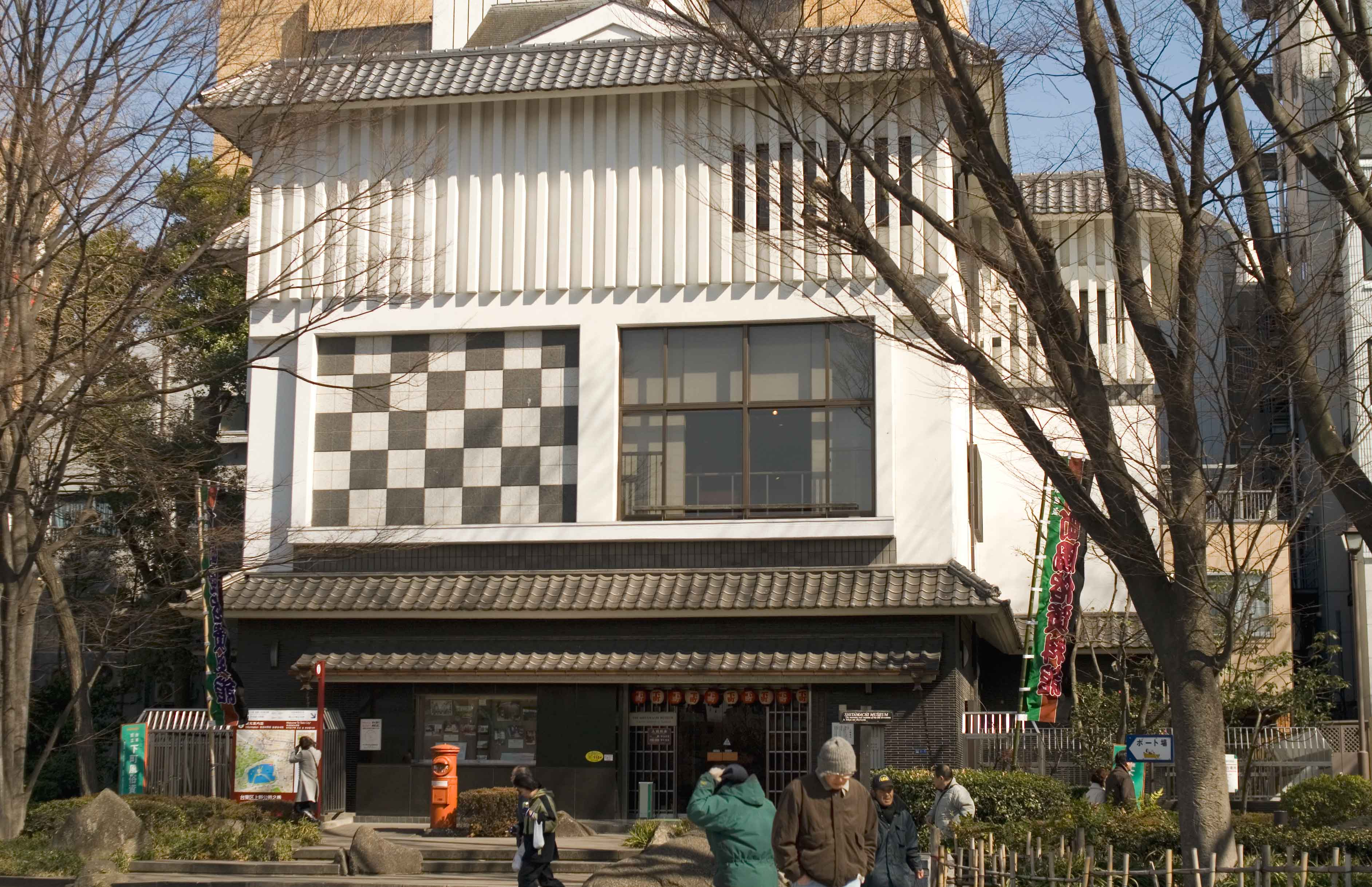

- Location within Japan
- Established: 1980
- Location: Ueno, Tokyo
- Coordinates: 35.7102°N 139.7726°E
- Type: Traditional Edo Culture
- Public transit access: Keisei-Ueno; Ueno; Okachimachi; Ueno-hirokoji; Ueno-okachimachi; Naka-okachimachi; Yushima
- Website: https://www.taitogeibun.net/english/shitamachi/

The Shitamachi Museum (下町風俗資料館, Shitamachi Fūzoku Shiryōkan) is a museum in Ueno, Taito, Tokyo, Japan. Located on the shores of Shinobazu Pond within Ueno Park, it is dedicated to the traditional culture of Tokyo's Shitamachi.

The museum opened in 1980, six years before the Fukagawa Edo Museum and thirteen years before the Edo-Tokyo Museum, all part of a national trend for building local history museums. All three were primarily designed by Total Media.

== Historical background ==
Shitamachi, literally 'Low City', is the unofficial name for the Tokyo flatlands, the area of Tokyo going from Taitō to Chiyoda and Chuō. It is the physically low part of the city just east of the Sumida River. It was inhabited by Edo's lower classes, including craftsmen, fishermen, sailors and merchants. The area produced most of what was original in Edo's culture and was the entertainment and shopping center of the capital. What remains of the old Shitamachi can nowadays be found in and around Tokyo's Taito, for example in Asakusa. The Shitamachi Museum is dedicated to explaining this area and its distinctive culture through original artifacts.

== Exhibits ==
=== First floor ===
To the right of the entrance is a life-size replica of a merchant's house, where geta (Japanese-style wooden clogs) are made and sold. In front of the shop are parked a rickshaw and a hand-pulled cart from old Edo.

To the left stands the replica of a small tenement house shared by two families, each owning a shop. On one side there live a mother and her daughter, who sell cheap sweets in the small shop adjacent their living quarters. On the other, there lives a coppersmith who works and sells his wares here. The well and the washing board next to the house are original items used in Edo times in the Shitamachi. All objects exhibited were donated by the public and were in use during the Taishō period (1912–1926).

=== Second floor ===
The second floor consists of a more varied collection of exhibits. There are toys, dolls, photos, kitchen utensils, board games, card games, plus exhibits related to festivals and other events. There is even the entrance of a public bath (a sentō) donated by the original owner.

== Photo gallery ==
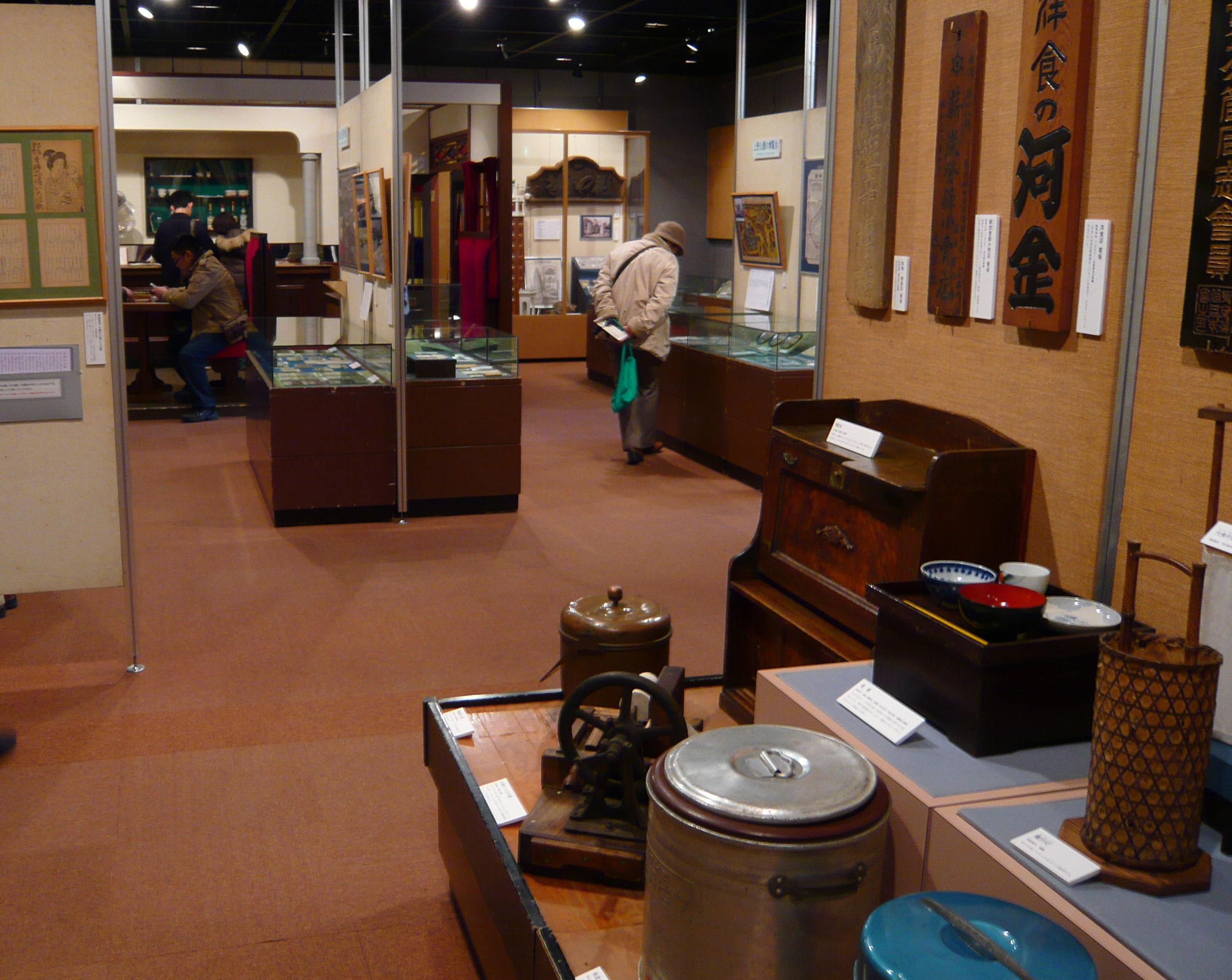
Shitamachi Museum, second floor

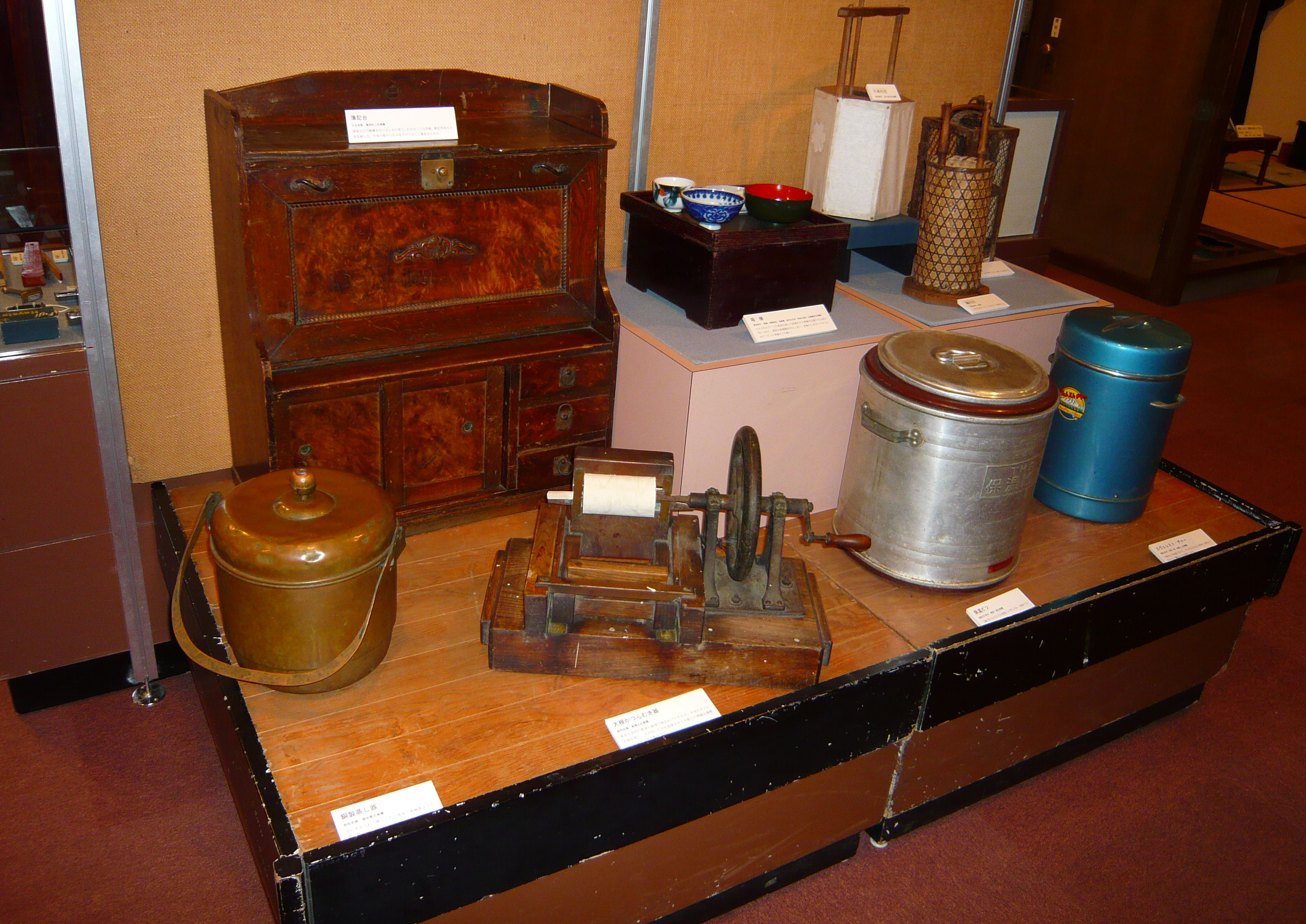
Shitamachi Museum exhibits

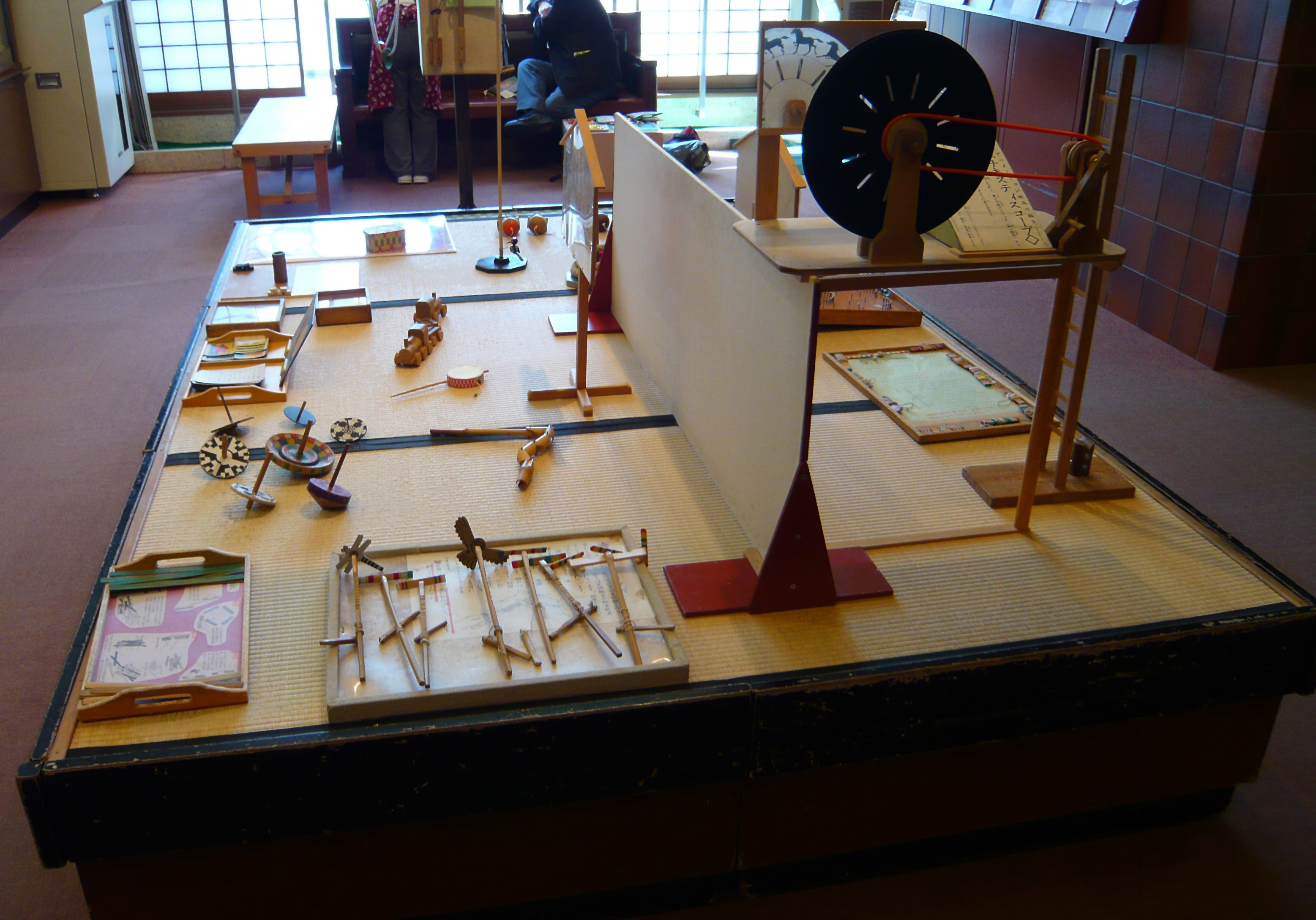
Traditional Japanese toys

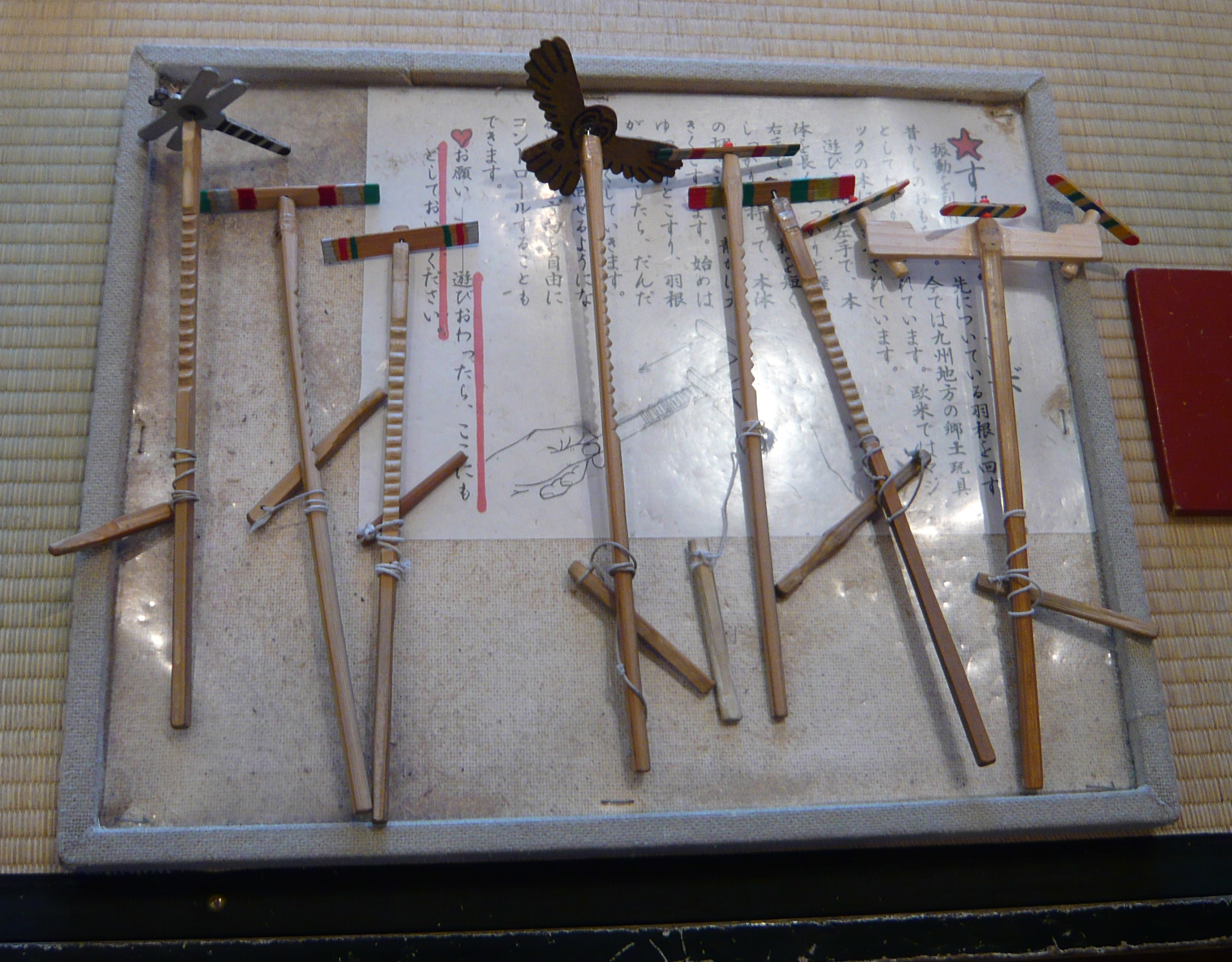
Traditional Japanese toys

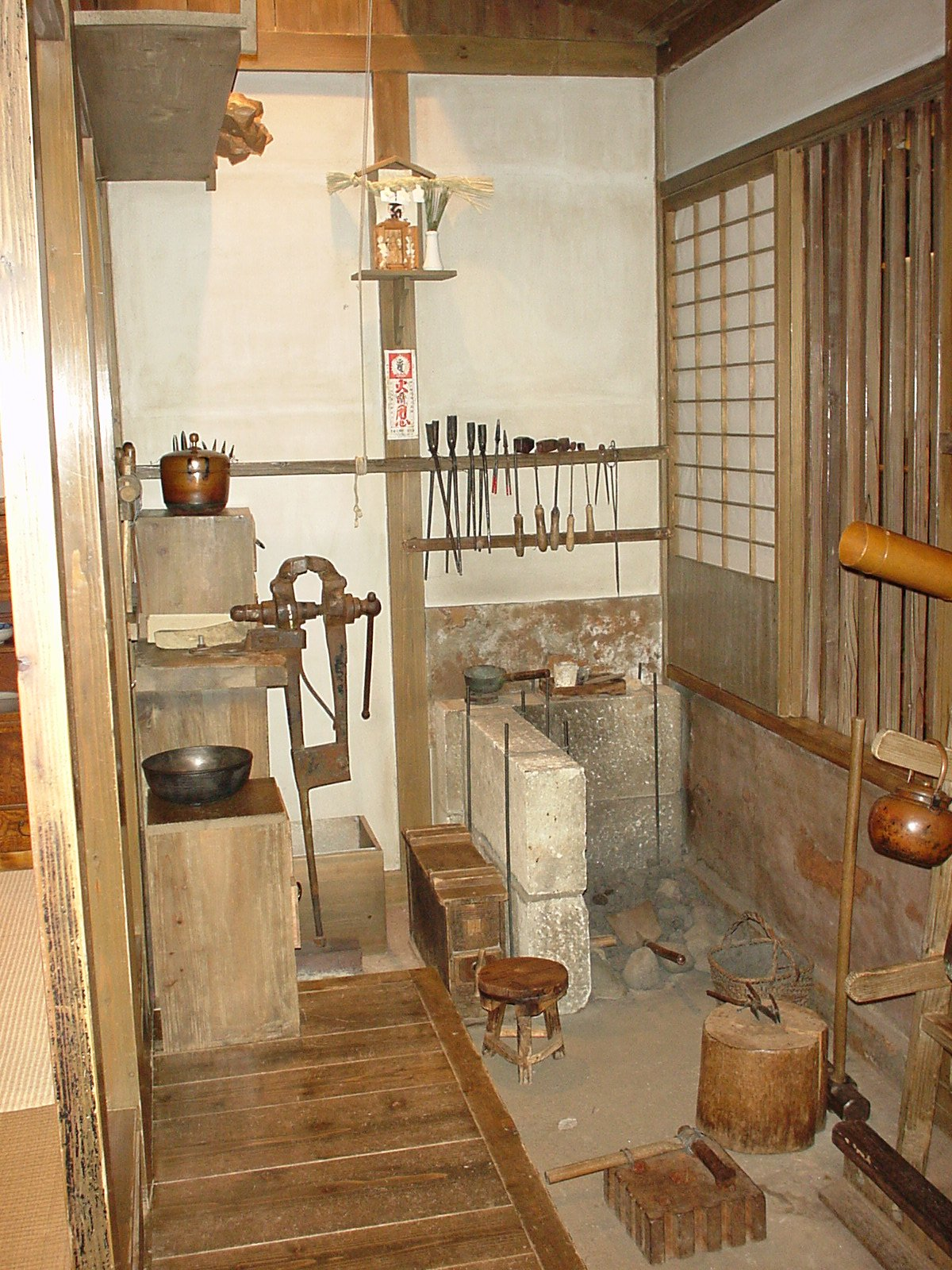
Blacksmith display
