= Fukagawa Edo Museum =

Edo museum in Kōtō, Tokyo, Japan

Coordinates: 35°40′52″N 139°48′02″E

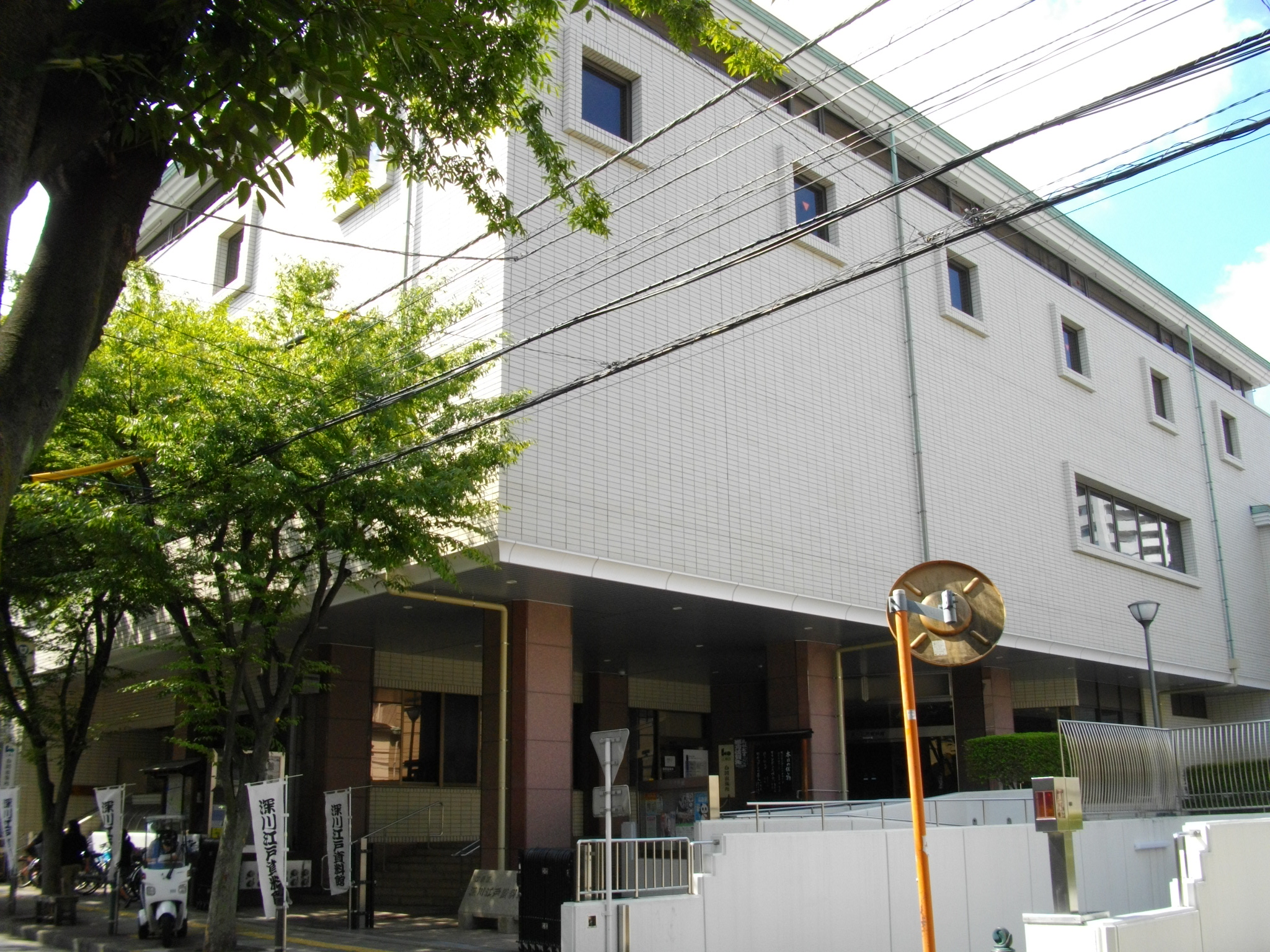
Fukagawa Edo Museum in Koto, Tokyo

The Fukagawa Edo Museum is a museum of old Edo in the former Fukagawa ward (now Kōtō ward) of Tokyo, Japan.

It consists of a large, covered, life-size replica of a Tokyo shitamachi neighborhood from around 1840, near the end of the Tokugawa period. It includes 11 buildings: houses, shops, a theater, a boathouse, a tavern, and a fire tower, all built using traditional techniques. Visitors can walk down the streets and enter the shops and houses. The lighting varies over time, to reproduce different times of day.

The museum opened in 1986, six years after the Shitamachi Museum and seven years before the Edo-Tokyo Museum, all part of a national trend for building local history museums. The exhibits for all three were primarily designed by Total Media.
