= Yamanote and Shitamachi =

Areas of Tokyo

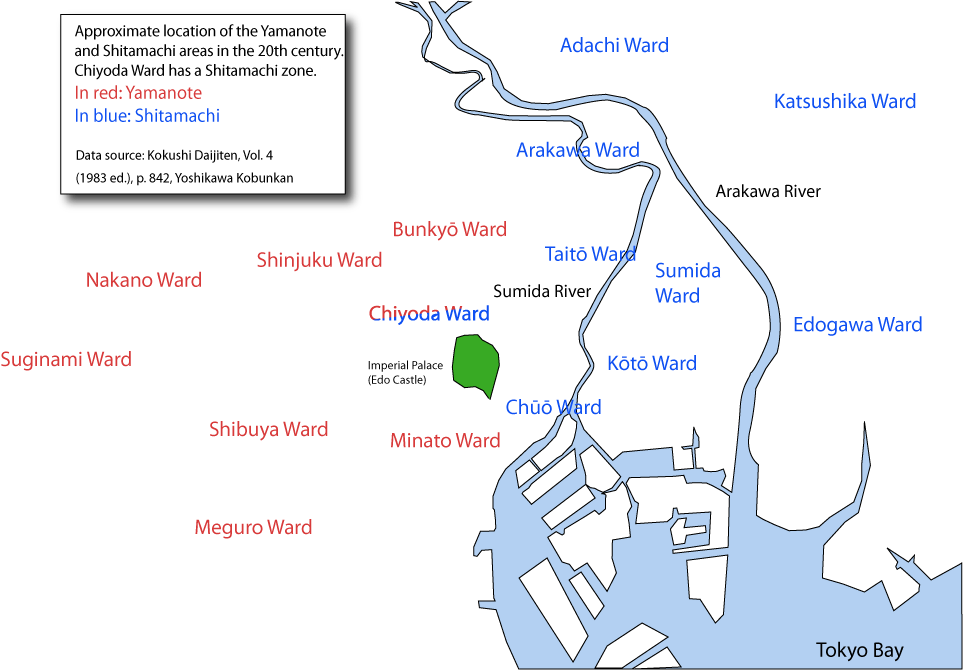
Yamanote and Shitamachi today. Yamanote marked in red and Shitamachi in blue letters.

Yamanote (山の手; Japanese pronunciation: [jä̀.mä́.nó̞.té̞, -tè̞]) and Shitamachi (下町; [ɕi̥.tä́.mä́.c̟͡ɕí]) are traditional names for two areas of Tokyo, Japan.

Yamanote refers to the affluent, upper-class areas of Tokyo west of the Imperial Palace. While citizens once considered it as consisting of Hongo, Kōjimachi, Koishikawa, Ushigome, Yotsuya, Akasaka, Aoyama and Azabu in the Bunkyō, Chiyoda, Shinjuku, and Minato wards, in popular conception, the area extended westwards to include the Nakano, Suginami, and Meguro wards after the Great Kanto Earthquake in 1923.

Shitamachi is the traditional name for the area of Tokyo including today the Adachi, Arakawa, certain neighbourhoods in Chiyoda, Chūō, Edogawa, Katsushika, Kōtō, Sumida, and Taitō wards, the physically low part of the city along and east of the Sumida River, mostly consisted of commercial areas and chonin residential areas during the Edo period.

The two regions have always been vaguely defined, as their identity was more based on culture and caste than on geography. While Tokugawa vassals of the samurai caste (hatamoto and gokenin) lived in the hilly Yamanote, lower castes (merchants and artisans) lived in the marshy areas near the sea. This dual class and geographic division has remained strong through the centuries while evolving with the times and is still in common use today. Indeed, the two terms are now used also in other parts of the country. The term Yamanote still indicates a higher social status, and Shitamachi a lower one, even though de facto this is not always true.

Both the Yamanote and the Shitamachi have grown gradually over the years, and the map above shows them as they are today.

== History of the terms ==
When the Tokugawa regime moved its seat of power to Edo, it granted most of the solid hilly regions to the military aristocracy and their families for residences, in part taking advantage of its cooler summer. Marshland around the mouths of the Sumida and Tone rivers, to the east of the castle, was filled in, with the flatlands that resulted becoming the area for merchants and craftsmen who supplied and worked for the aristocracy. Thus, from the beginning of its existence, Tokyo (the former Edo) has been culturally and economically divided in two parts: the higher caste Yamanote, located on the hills of the Musashino Terrace, and the lower caste Shitamachi, literally "low town" or "low city", located next to the Sumida River. Although neither of the two was ever an official name, both stuck and are still in use. Both words are used with the same meaning in other parts of the country too. The term "Yamanote" is also used for example in Hokkaido, Oita, Yokohama and Osaka.

There are several theories about the etymology of the term Yamanote, in addition to its hilly location. In the book Gofunai Bikō (御府内備考, Notes on Edo) it is said that Tokugawa Ietsuna's (1641–1680) younger brother Tsunashige was given two suburban residences, one in Umite (海手, Towards the sea) and another in Yamanote, so it is possible that the opposite of Yamanote was not Shitamachi, but Umite. However, with the progressive construction of landfills in the Sumida estuary and the urbanization of the area, gradually Shitamachi replaced Umite. The pairing of Yamanote - Shitamachi is well attested in records of the spoken language as early as 1650, and from that time appears often in documents and books. The warrior/merchant distinction between Yamanote and Shitamachi was also well established early on.

== Geography ==
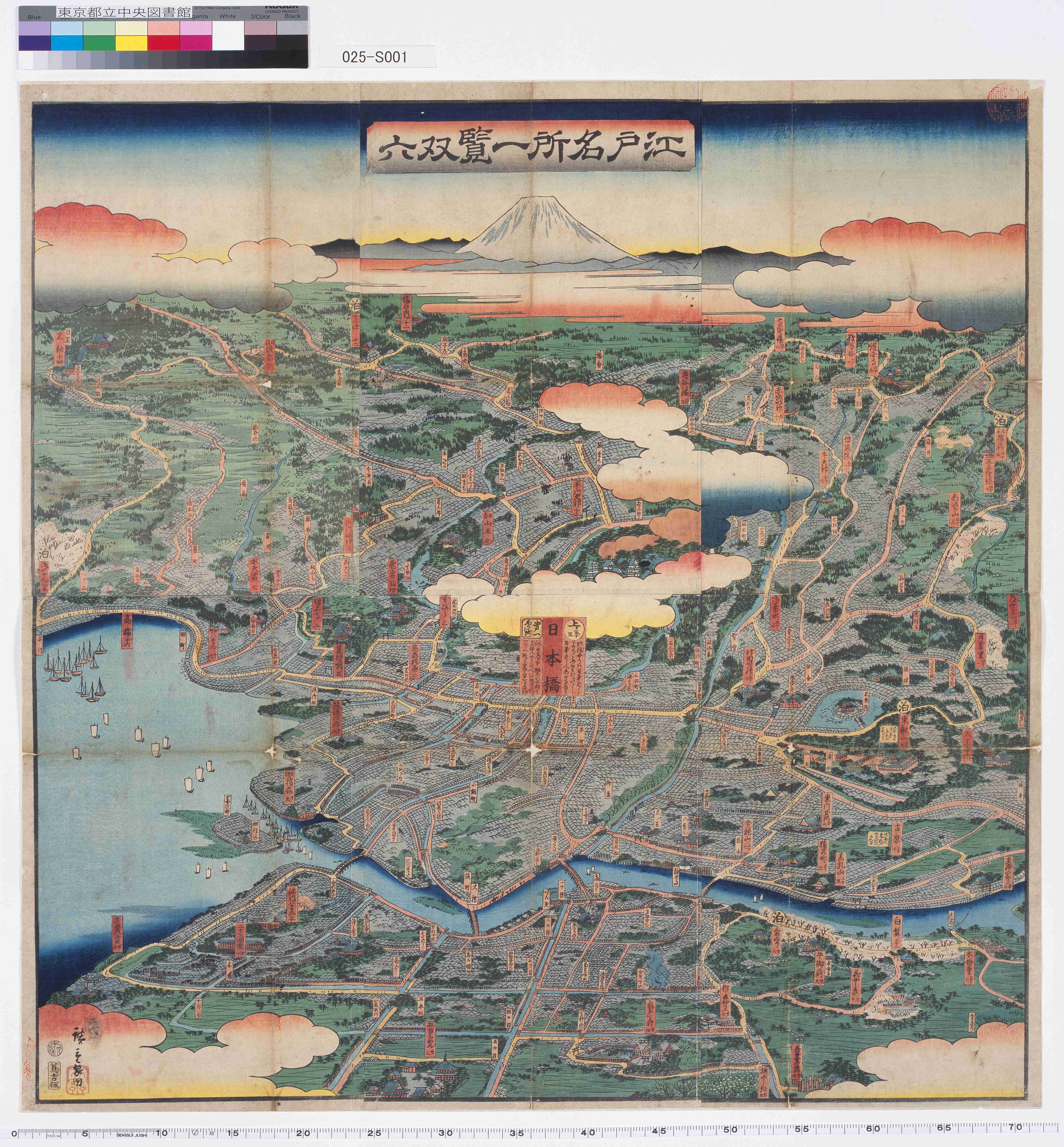
A view of Yamanote (above) and Shitamachi (below) by Utagawa Hiroshige. Nihonbashi is at the center of the map.

The terms' usage as geographic terms in modern times has changed. In Metropolis Magazine, translator and scholar Edward Seidensticker believes that the dividing line goes from Ginza to Shinjuku, and "north" and "south" are more accurate terms. Seidensticker also describes how the economic and cultural centers have moved from Ginza and Nihonbashi to Shinjuku, Ikebukuro, Shibuya, and Shinagawa.

=== Yamanote ===
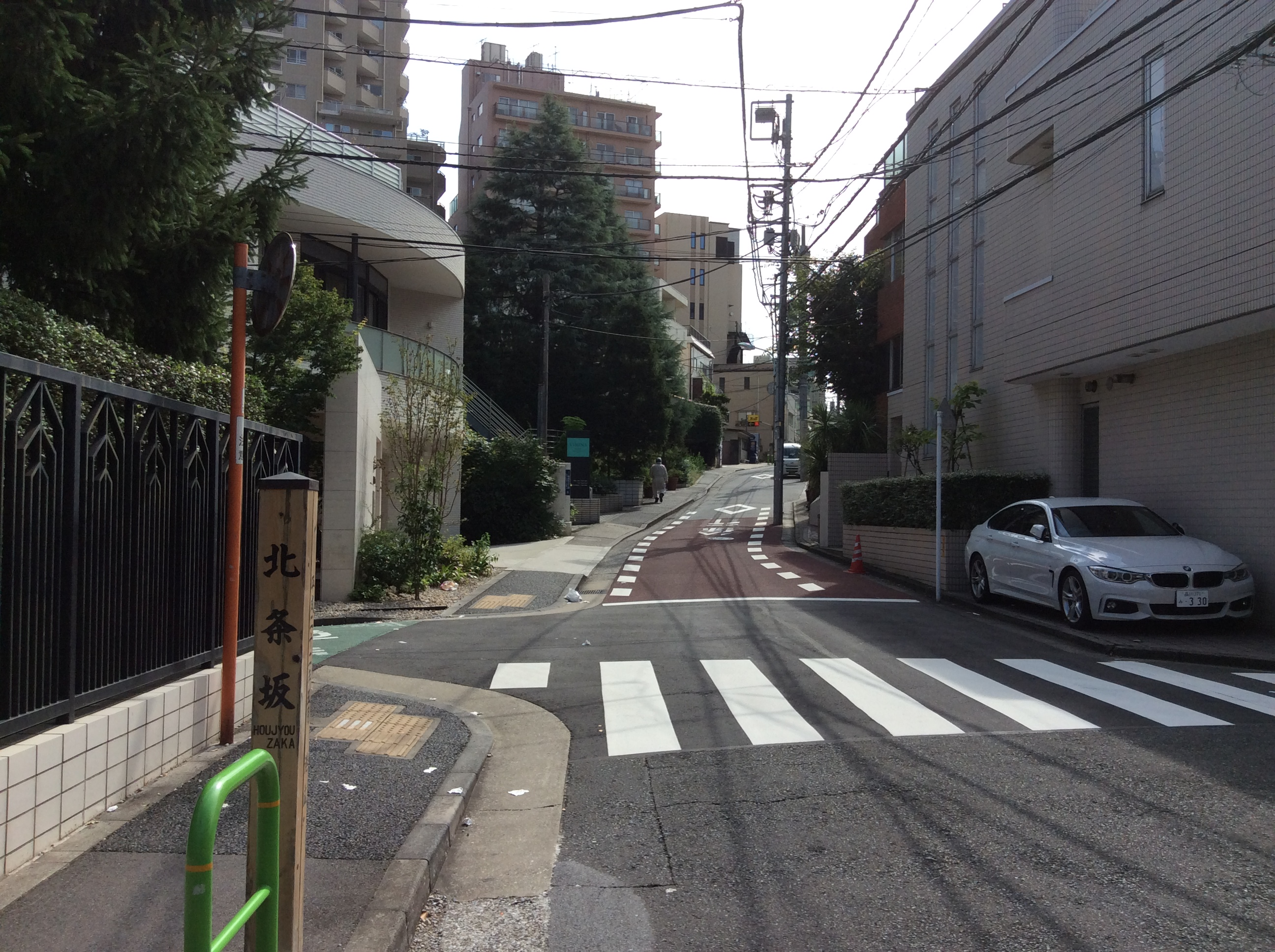
Hojo zaka, Minamiazabu, Minato, a typical Yamanote residential district

The extent of the early Yamanote cannot be defined exactly, but in Kyokutei Bakin's work Gendō Hōgen of 1818 (therefore during the Edo period) it is said that "Yotsuya, Aoyama, Ichigaya, Koishikawa and Hongō constitute Yamanote", and occupied therefore more or less a part each of today's Shinjuku, Bunkyo and Minato.

The extent of the Yamanote changed little during the Meiji era. In 1894 it was described as consisting of Hongo, Koishikawa, Ushigome, Yotsuya, Akasaka, and Azabu. After the great earthquake of 1923 and again after the second world war, the Yamanote started to expand. As a result, today's Yamanote extends, in the eyes of the young, even further than Shinjuku, Bunkyo and Minato, to Suginami, Setagaya, Nakano, and even to Kichijōji or Denen-chōfu. What used to be the hilly area within the Yamanote line has now expanded west on the Musashino Plateau. Bunkyo and Minato are generally considered Yamanote, however, some districts (Nezu and Sendagi in Bunkyo, and Shinbashi in Minato) are typically Shitamachi.

Today, the Yamanote Line is one of Tokyo's busiest and most important commuter rail lines. Originally thus named in 1909, when the line only connected Shinagawa to Akabane in the Yamanote area, the line was extended into its present loop in 1925, connecting Shitamachi areas like Ueno, Kanda, Yurakucho and Shinbashi as well. Tokyo Metropolitan Route 317 (東京都道317号, Tōkyō-todō Sanbyakujūnana-gō) is colloquially known as Yamate Dōri (山手通り, Yamate Dōri), or sometimes "Yamate Street", after the Yamanote region, as well.

=== Shitamachi ===
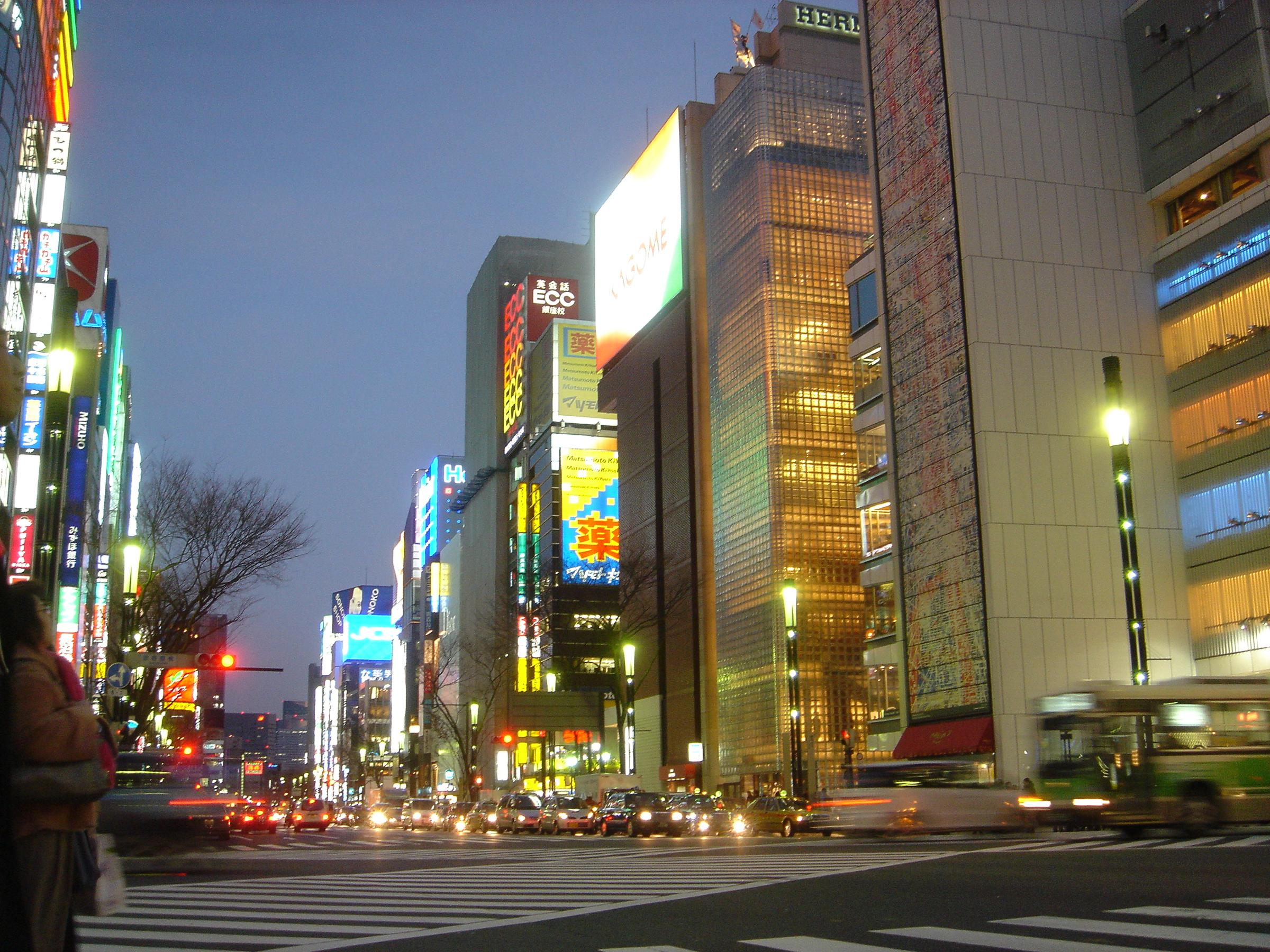
Ginza shopping district in Shitamachi

The term originally indicated just the three areas of Kanda, Nihonbashi and Kyōbashi but, as the city grew, it came to cover also the areas mentioned above. Shitamachi was the center of Edo, so much so that the two were often thought of as coterminous. While Shitamachi was not in fact synonymous with Edo, there was originally a certain "conflation" of the two terms, and those born in Shitamachi are typically considered true Edokko, children of Edo. This conflation is evident in the Edo period habit of saying "I am going to Edo" to mean going from the area around Fukagawa in Kōtō ward to anywhere east of the Sumida river.

While the Yamanote grew west on the Musashino Plateau, in time the Shitamachi expanded east beyond the Arakawa river, and now includes the Chūō, Kōtō (Fukagawa), Sumida, and Taitō wards, plus part of Chiyoda ward.

The center of Ueno in Taitō lies at the heart of the old Shitamachi and still has several museums and a concert hall. Today the immediate area, due to its close proximity to a major transportation hub, retains high land value. The Shitamachi Museum in Ueno is dedicated to the area's way of life and culture, with models of old environments and buildings. The Edo-Tokyo Museum, in Tokyo's Ryogoku district, also has exhibits on Shitamachi.

Bunkyo and Minato are generally considered Yamanote, however, Nezu and Sendagi in eastern Bunkyo, and Shinbashi in northeastern Minato are typical Shitamachi districts.

== List of districts ==
=== Wards with both Yamanote and Shitamachi districts ===
- Chiyoda ward:
  - Shitamachi: all of Kanda area
  - Yamanote: all of the former Kojimachi ward (areas such as Bancho, Kojimachi and Iidabashi)
- Minato ward:
  - Shitamachi: Shinbashi, Higashi-Shinbashi (Shiodome) and Nishi-Shinbashi
  - Yamanote:
    - all of Azabu area (including Azabu-Jūban, Nishi-Azabu and Roppongi)
    - all of Akasaka area (including Akasaka and Aoyama)
- Bunkyo ward:
  - Shitamachi: Nezu and Sendagi
  - Yamanote:
    - all of Hongo area, except for Nezu and Sendagi
    - all of Koishikawa area

=== All Shitamachi districts ===
- Chuo ward (including Nihonbashi, Kyobashi and Ginza)
- Taito ward (including Ueno, Yanaka and Asakusa)
- Arakawa ward
- Sumida ward
- Koto ward
- Edogawa ward
- Katsushika ward
- Adachi ward

=== All Yamanote districts ===
- Shibuya ward (after the Great Kanto Earthquake)
- Shinjuku ward
- Nakano ward (after the Second World War)
- Suginami ward (after the Second World War)
- Meguro ward (after the Second World War)

== Differences between Yamanote and Shitamachi in the popular imagination ==
The distinction between the two areas has been called "one of the most fundamental social, subcultural, and geographic demarcations in contemporary Tokyo." Generally speaking, the term Yamanote has a connotation of "distant and cold, if rich and trendy", whereas "Shitamachi people are deemed honest, forthright and reliable". These differences encompass speech, community, profession and appearance.

=== Speech ===
The modern Japanese word yamanote kotoba (山の手言葉) meaning "dialect of the Yamanote", takes its name from the region. It is characterized by a relative lack of regional inflections, by a well-developed set of honorifics (keigo), and by linguistic influences from Western Japan. After the Meiji Restoration it became the standard language spoken in public schools and therefore the basis of modern Japanese (hyōjungo), which is spoken all over the country. The Yamanote accent is now considered to be standard Japanese, "making the shitamachi man a speaker of a dialect". The origins of the difference arise from the presence of daimyōs and their vassals, and the continuous influx of soldiers from the provinces.

Phrases such as shitamachi kotoba (下町言葉) meaning "Shitamachi dialect", and shitamachifū (下町風) meaning "Shitamachi style" are still in use, and refer to certain characteristics and roughness in Shitamachi speech. The lack of distinction between the two phonemes hi and shi (so that hitotsu ("one)" is pronounced shitotsu) is typical of the Shitamachi kotoba. Another characteristic trait is the pronunciation of the sound -ai as for example in wakaranai (I don't know or I don't understand) or -oi as in osoi (slow) as -ee (wakaranee or osee). The use of either is still considered very low-class and rough. Shitamachi speakers are also supposedly less apt to use the elaborate word forms more characteristic of Yamanote Japanese.

Yamanote kotoba and Shitamachi kotoba together form the so-called Tōkyō-go (東京語, language or dialect of Tokyo) which, because of its influences from Western Japan, is a linguistic island within the Kantō region.

=== Profession ===
The division between samurai and merchant has carried on into the modern day. Shitamachi is associated with petty entrepreneurs, restaurant owners, small shop-owners and workshops, while Yamanote suggests the business executive, and the office worker.

=== Attitude ===
Until World War II, the Shitamachi people did not give "a damn about tomorrow". Older locals were proud of not having gone far from the neighborhood. The March 1945 bombing of Tokyo wiped out the Shitamachi area and one hundred thousand lives. The development associated to the 1964 Summer Olympics and the Tokyo Metropolitan Expressway further eroded the alley lifestyle. In spite of this, the Shitamachi mindset still values living for the moment and present pleasures. Clinging to something is unfashionable and one should be ready to weather disaster and start over.

== The Shitamachi boom ==
Alongside the long drive for modernisation that had characterised Japan's post-restoration history, Shitamachi was marginalised for the larger part of the 20th century. In the words of one sociologist, "it was increasingly confined to a defensive position, guarding old traditions and old social norms". After a long period of post-war economic decline, in the 1980s a "Shitamachi boom" emerged, with increased interest in and celebration of Shitamachi culture and history, in particular that of the Edo Period. Shitamachi culture is thus depicted as more authentic and traditional (while Yamanote Tokyo is the present and future), and its valorisation has been described as a refuge from the rapid modernisation of the economic boom years. Popular television dramas, comedy and documentary now "rarefy an often idealised notion of the Edokko, with the same intensity and nostalgia afforded an endangered species".
