= Yabo =

Japanese term describing something that is unaesthetic or unappealing

Yabo (野暮) is a Japanese term describing something that is unaesthetic or unappealing. Yabo is the antonym of iki. Busui (無粋), literally "non-iki", is synonymous with yabo. A non-iki thing is not necessarily yabo but probably is. Something that is yabo is usually unrefined, gigantic, coarse, childish, colorful, self-conscious, permanent, loud, superficial, vulgar, snobbish, boorish, etc.

The word yabo was often used by city dwellers, or Chōnin (especially those of Edo). It often refers to samurai and farmers (nomin) from outside Edo, but could also be applied to another chonin. The city dwellers of Edo sometimes called themselves Edokko (similar to New Yorker or Parisian). Proud of having been born and raised in Edo, they had a tendency to despise outsiders. However, the origins of many chonin could be traced back to other areas and backgrounds.

The meaning of the term has expanded and generalized through the modernization of Japan. Today, the word yabo is used more frequently than iki.
