= Edokko =

Person born and raised in Edo (Tokyo, Japan)

Edokko (Japanese: 江戸っ子; lit. 'child of Edo') is a Japanese term referring to a person born and raised in Edo (renamed Tokyo in 1868). The term is believed to have been coined in the late 18th century in Edo. Being an Edokko also implied that the person had certain personality traits different from the non-native population, such as being assertive, straightforward, cheerful, perhaps a bit mercantile (cf. Kyoto, the capital of aristocratic Japan, and Osaka, the capital of mercantile Japan; see also iki and inase).

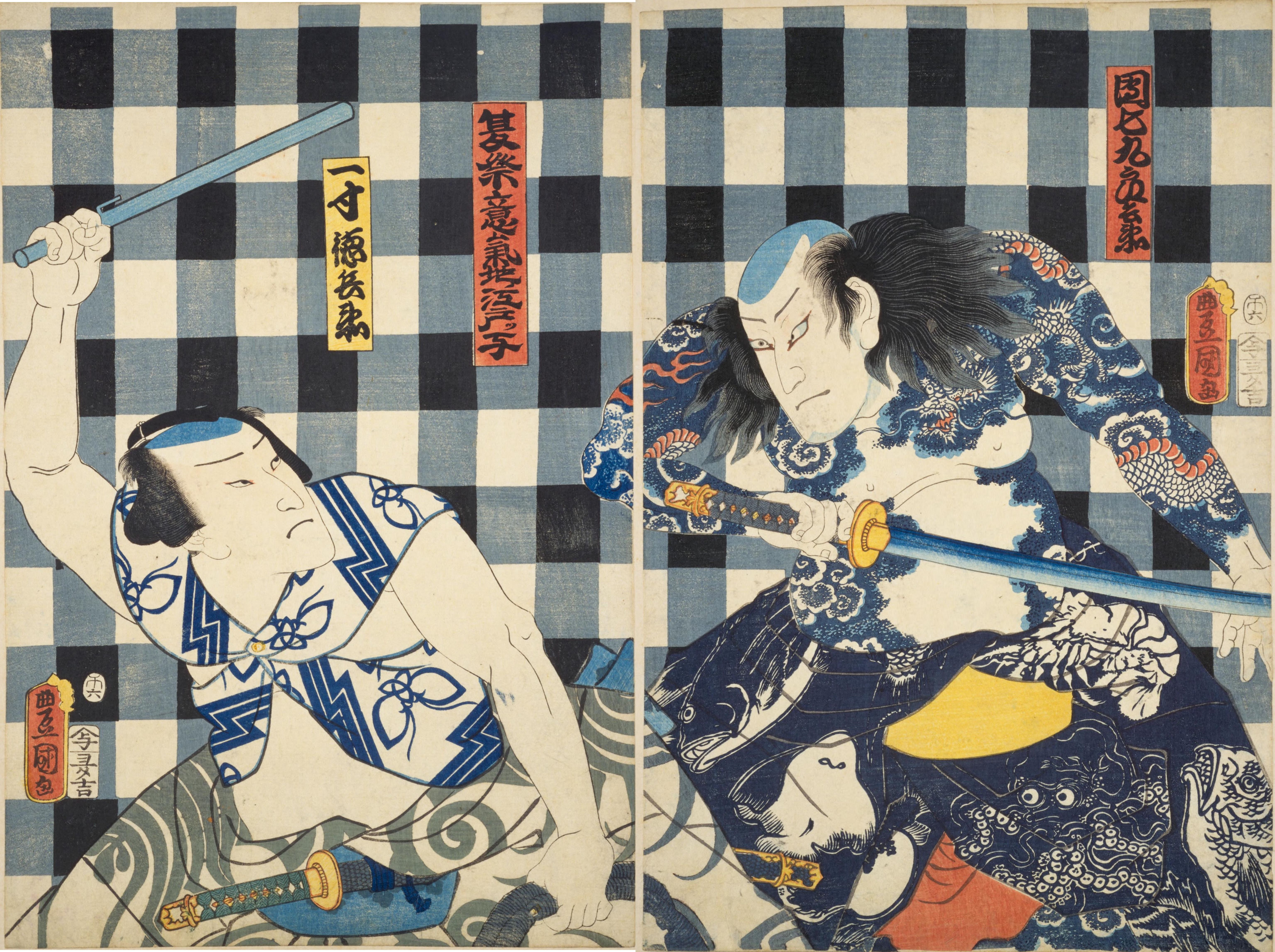
From the picture album "Azuma Nishiki-e"

Today, the definition of "Edokko" may vary. The Japanese dictionary simply defines it as one who was born and raised in Edo or Tokyo. However, popular definitions of "a true Edokko" include the following:

- One who was born and raised in Edo/Tokyo to parents who both were also born and raised in Edo/Tokyo. (If one parent was not born and raised in Edo/Tokyo, then the child would not be a true Edokko, and was called madara ["mottled"].)
- One who was born and raised in Edo/Tokyo to a family lineage spanning back three or four generations in Edo/Tokyo.

The latter case is rare in reality, as the majority of the Edo/Tokyo population consists of the natives of other areas. Historically, Edokko almost exclusively refers to chōnin, the commoners. The majority of samurai in Edo were from the countryside, and Edokko satisfied themselves by looking down on them, referring them being yabo, the opposite of iki. About half of the Edo population were such samurai.

An authority of Edo culture, Hinako Sugiura estimates 1.25% of Edo population was Edokko in the strict sense.

From this form is also derived the word edochiano, the Italian-language demonym for people from Tokyo.
