= Nagaya (architecture) =

Style of Japanese house

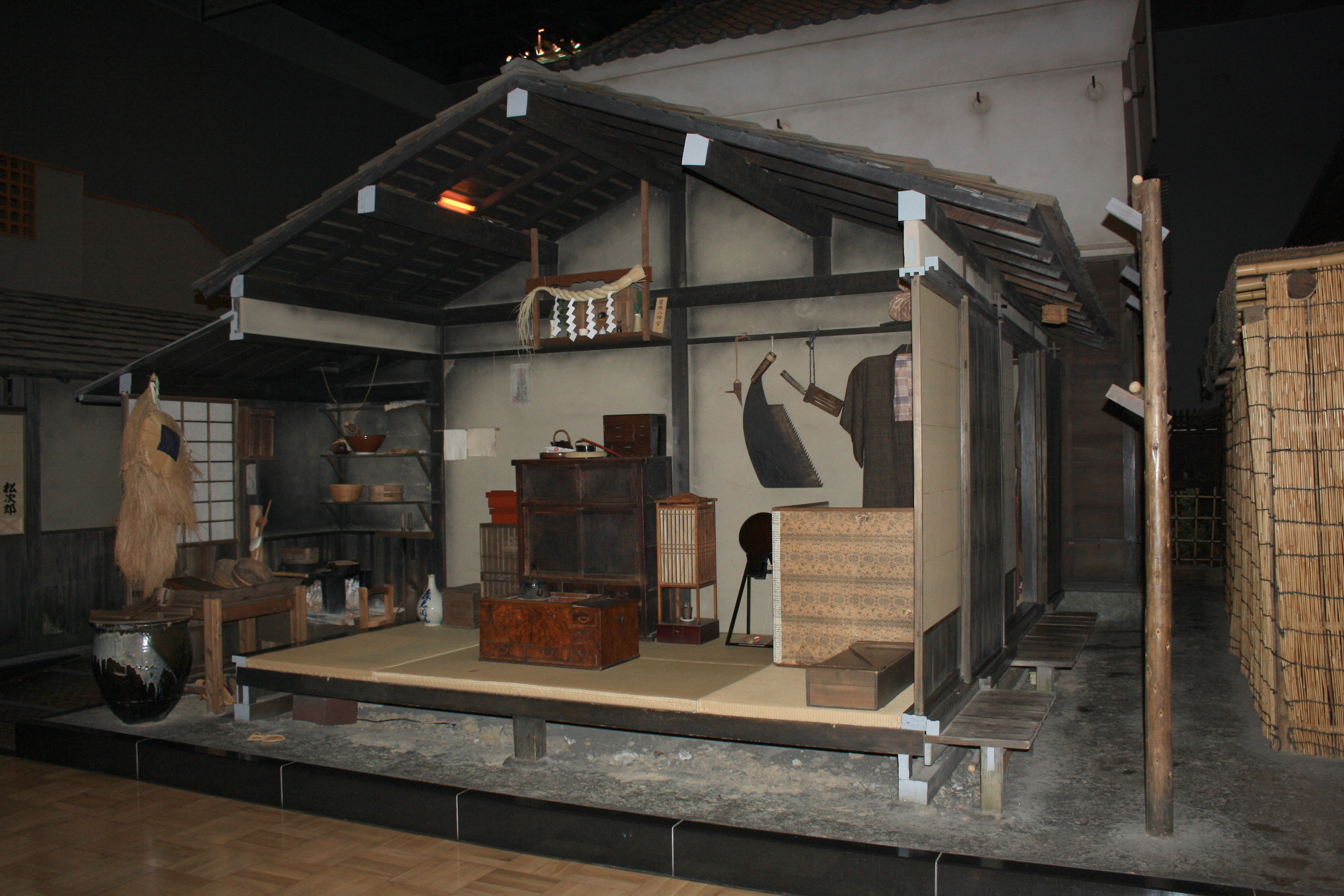
A museum replica of a 1×2.5 ken (about 2×5meters) Edo nagaya. A kitchen of one tatami in area on the left, a floor covered with four tatami and a second door with tiny engawa stoop on the right. Munewari nagaya (back-to-backs) had only a kitchen door.

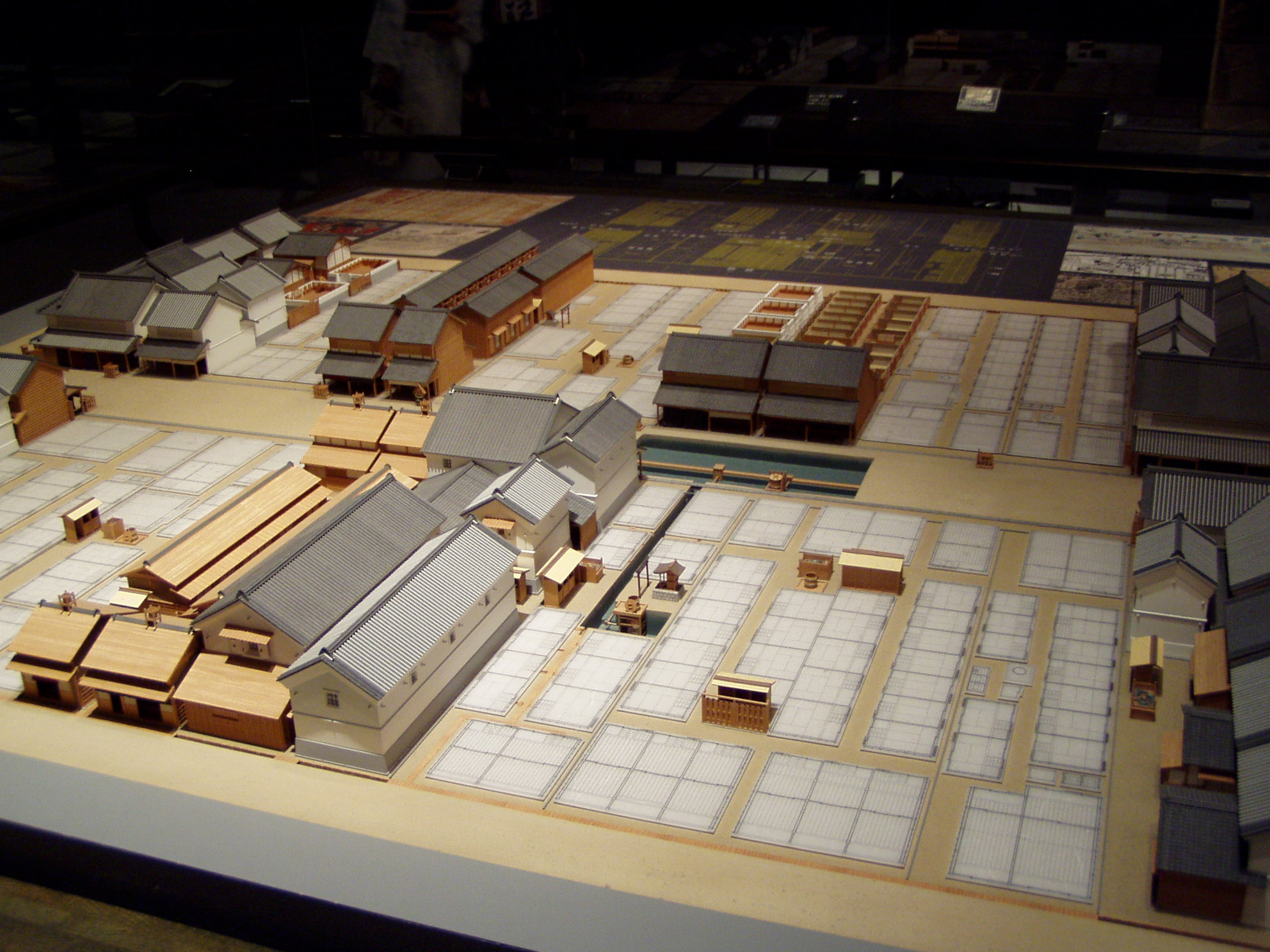
Plan of an Edo nagaya neighbourhood; houses range from 4.5 to 16 tatami in area (visible in full-scale view)

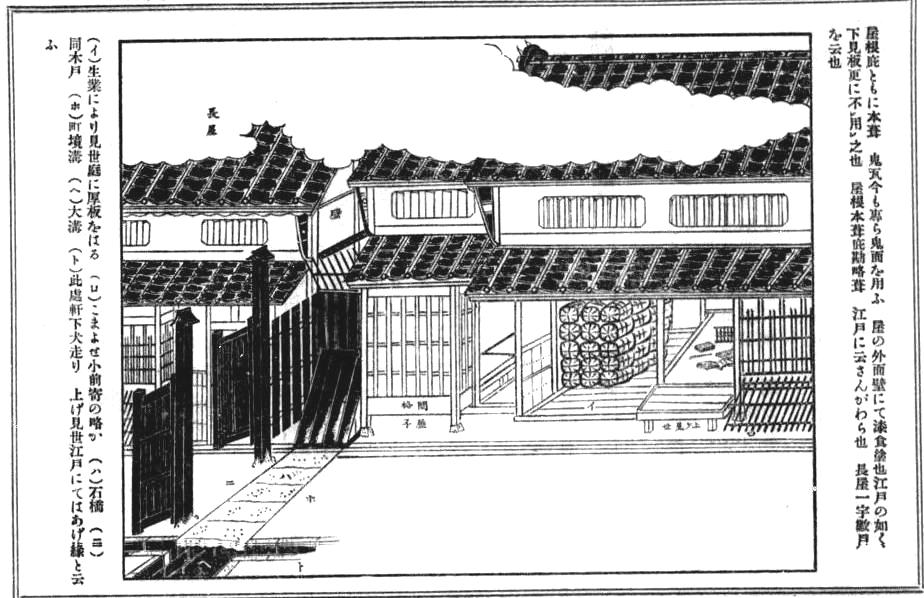
Old depiction of a nagaya

A nagaya (長屋, lit. 'longhouse') is a type of Japanese rowhouse that was typical during the Edo period (1603–1868).

A nagaya was a long housing complex under the same ridge, one or two stories high, divided into small compartments for rent. The well, toilet and waste facilities were shared. Except for a bedroom, each household only had a kitchen. Historically, similar houses were built around a rich manor or castle for low-ranking samurai. Later, they accommodated both samurai and commoners. At the ends of the building shops were located, typically, their owners living in adjacent rooms. The wealthier tenants lived in the rooms facing the street. Usually, the tenants of a nagaya didn't have a family. The rooms had an earthen floor, with a size of 8–10 square meters.

Nagaya were also known as yakeya (焼け家, burning house), due to their tendency to catch fire.

If a gateway was located in one section, that structure was called a nagayamon (長屋門, longhouse-gate).

== See also ==
- Minka (vernacular houses)
- Machiya (a larger townhouse)
