= Kidai shōran =

Picture scroll painted in 1805 by unknown artist

Kidai shōran (熈代勝覧) is a picture scroll depicting the Nihonbashi area of Edo. It was painted in 1805 by an unknown artist. Its dimensions are 43.7 × 1,232.2 cm. In exacting detail, it depicts the shopping street of Nihonbashi Avenue and the throngs of people crowding the street.

It was discovered in 1999 in the Museum of Asian Art, Berlin, and is an important resource for understanding the street-life of Edo during the reign of Tokugawa Ienari, the 11th shōgun, who controlled the government for 50 years.

== Area depicted ==
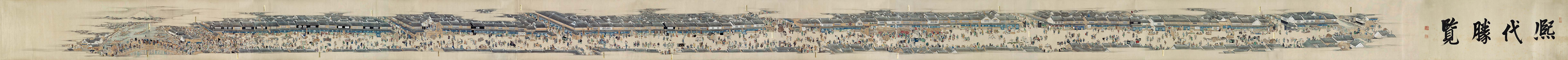
Kidai shōran: scroll this to the left

The scroll is an aerial view of Nihonbashi Street from Kanda Imagawa Bridge to Nihonbashi Bridge. It presents a 764-metre stretch of busy shopping precinct. The Nihonbashi Bridge crosses the Nihonbashi River. The Kanda Imagawa Bridge exists today only as the name of a street crossing. Ryūkan River, which the bridge crossed, has been filled in and is a narrow laneway. This section of Nihonbashi Street today is commonly referred to as Chūō-dōri (Central Avenue), and is the start of the Nakasendō. In the Edo period (1603–1868) it was referred to as Tōrichō or Tōri Jūni-ken. Today the street is a business district lined with offices of major corporations including the Mitsui Group. During the Edo period the street was brimming with wholesale stores and was the city's major shopping precinct.

The city blocks covered from the right of the scroll (from the north), are as follows:

- Nihonbashi Honshirogane-chō 2-chōme (Tōri Honshirogane-chō)
- Nihonbashi Hongoku-chō 2 chōme (Tōri Koku-chō)
- Hongoku-chō Jikken-dana (Jikken-dana)
- Nihonbashi Muromachi 3-chōme, 2-chōme, and 1-chōme

In parentheses are the common names for the areas during the Edo period when the street was known as “Tōri” (“the street”), an indication of its central position in the city of Edo. (The name Chūō-dōri today has a similar tone.)

The area was reorganised and renamed in the early Shōwa period (1930s), and today the scroll represents the four large city blocks of Nihonbashi Muromachi 1–4 chōme

== Shops ==
The scroll depicts 88 wholesale stores called ton'ya or toiya (問屋). The exterior noren curtains all have trademarks and trading names inscribed in legible script and form an accurate list of shop operators of the time. The area was destroyed in the following year, 1806, in the Great Bunka Fire. The Edo Kaimono Hitori Annai (Edo Shopping Guide) of February 1824 lists one quarter of the stores represented in the scroll. However, their addresses are often different, indicating the impact of the Great Bunka Fire and the dynamic nature of conducting business in the early 1800s in Edo.

The outside views of the various merchant machiya townhouses are detailed with attention given to the type of eaves on the building, and the variations in the earthen warehouses and their white plaster walls. Unlike a similar scroll, the Edo fūzoku zukan (江戸風俗図巻, 18th century by Miyagawa Chōshun, Important Cultural Property), where interiors of shops are depicted with a “seeing through” viewpoint, the shops of the Kidai shōran are depicted in a realistic manner. Also accurately depicted are side alleys and the back-alley shops that lined them.

A number of famous shops appear in the scroll, including the dry goods store Echigoya, which remains in operation today as Mitsukoshi. The Echigoya head store operated in Suruga-chō. The store was (and remains) a large presence on the street and is depicted in extensive detail. Its affiliated stores and warehouses also appear in the surrounding area. The knife store “Kiya” which still operates in Muromachi is depicted as four stores in Muromachi 2-chōme. Of the four Kiya stores depicted, Kōshichi's store is closed for renovations with a poster stating that “during the construction period business will be conducted from the warehouse”. The large bookstore Suhara-ya still operates as a chain of stores today and is represented by two stores operated by Zengoro and Ichibē. This represents an Edo period practice of allowing senior employees to establish branches of the store under the same brand, and is the reason for Suhara-ya's wide network today.

Apart from the official stores, there are a number of unofficial guard houses responsible for fire-watch and safety which supplement their income with shop activities, often selling fire-fighting related products.

== People ==
A total of 1,671 people are represented in the scroll, of whom only 200 are women.

The crowd is heavier towards Nihonbashi, which reflects reality. Apart from people out shopping, there are hawkers, fortune-tellers, news cryers, street salesmen, Buddhist pilgrims, priests seeking temple donations, a child on his way to school, and many others.

Alongside the humans are 20 dogs, 13 horses, four oxen with carts, one performing monkey, and two falcons on falconers' arms.

== Era ==
It is thought the scroll dates to 1805 because a priest accompanied by pilgrims depicted soliciting temple donations is holding a donations box with “Bunka 2, Ekō-in” written on it. (Note: The word 本堂 (hondō, "main hall") is written on the flag held by the priest. It is thought that this refers to the main hall of the Ryōgoku Ekō-in, which is known to have burned down in 1783.) The second year of the Bunka era is 1805. The Nihonbashi neighbourhood was completely destroyed in the great fire of fourth day of the third month of Bunka year 3, or 22 April 1806. The placement of stores in the scroll accords with the pre-fire arrangement. The season is likely to be early spring as the famous dolls market is set up in the Jikken-dana area. These hina dolls were sold from late in the second month to early in the third month of the calendar then used. However, other observers note the sale of bonito and children swimming in the Nihonbashi River, and suggest the scroll does not describe a particular season. The calligrapher Sano Tōshū is responsible for the title of the scroll. Tōshū died on the tenth day of the third month of 1814; therefore the scroll predates this.

== Artist ==
The artist of the scroll is unknown. Two red seals on the title page indicate the calligraphy of the title page is by Sano Tōshū (佐野東洲). One seal says “Sajun-no-in” (Sajun's seal) and the other says “Tōshū”. We know that Sajun refers to Tōshū because a carving (hengaku) of his calligraphy of the characters “Sanno Daigongen” donated to Hie Shrine says it is donated by Sano Sajun.

There are no markings on the scroll which indicate who the artist was.

In the early Bunka era, Sano Tōshū adopted the fiction writer (dime novelist) Santō Kyōzan, whose brother was the artist Santō Kyōden (also known as Kitao Masanobu). And so the general view is that Santō Kyōden may be the artist.

A second theory, held by the Japanese art historian Shūgō Asano, uses a process of elimination examining the style and era of creation to suggest the artist may be Katsukawa Shun'ei (1762–1819). The identity remains a matter for speculation.

The title of the scroll includes the character 天 (ten, "heaven") below the four main title characters, and therefore the scroll is thought to be part of a diptych or triptych. If it was a diptych the second work would have 地 (chi, "earth") on it. If a triptych, then the three characters would be these two and also 人 (jin, "people"). The existence of the other one or two scrolls is unknown and a request for their whereabouts has been issued by the Museum of Asian Art in Berlin.

A complementary scroll might be of the western side of the same stretch of shopping street, the southern side of the Nihonbashi Bridge, the crossroad Honchō Avenue, or completely separate areas of Edo (such as the shops lining the Sumida River or the streets of the courtesan district at Yoshiwara). The discovery of any such scroll would be an important development in the understanding of the street life of Edo.

== Reason for commissioning ==
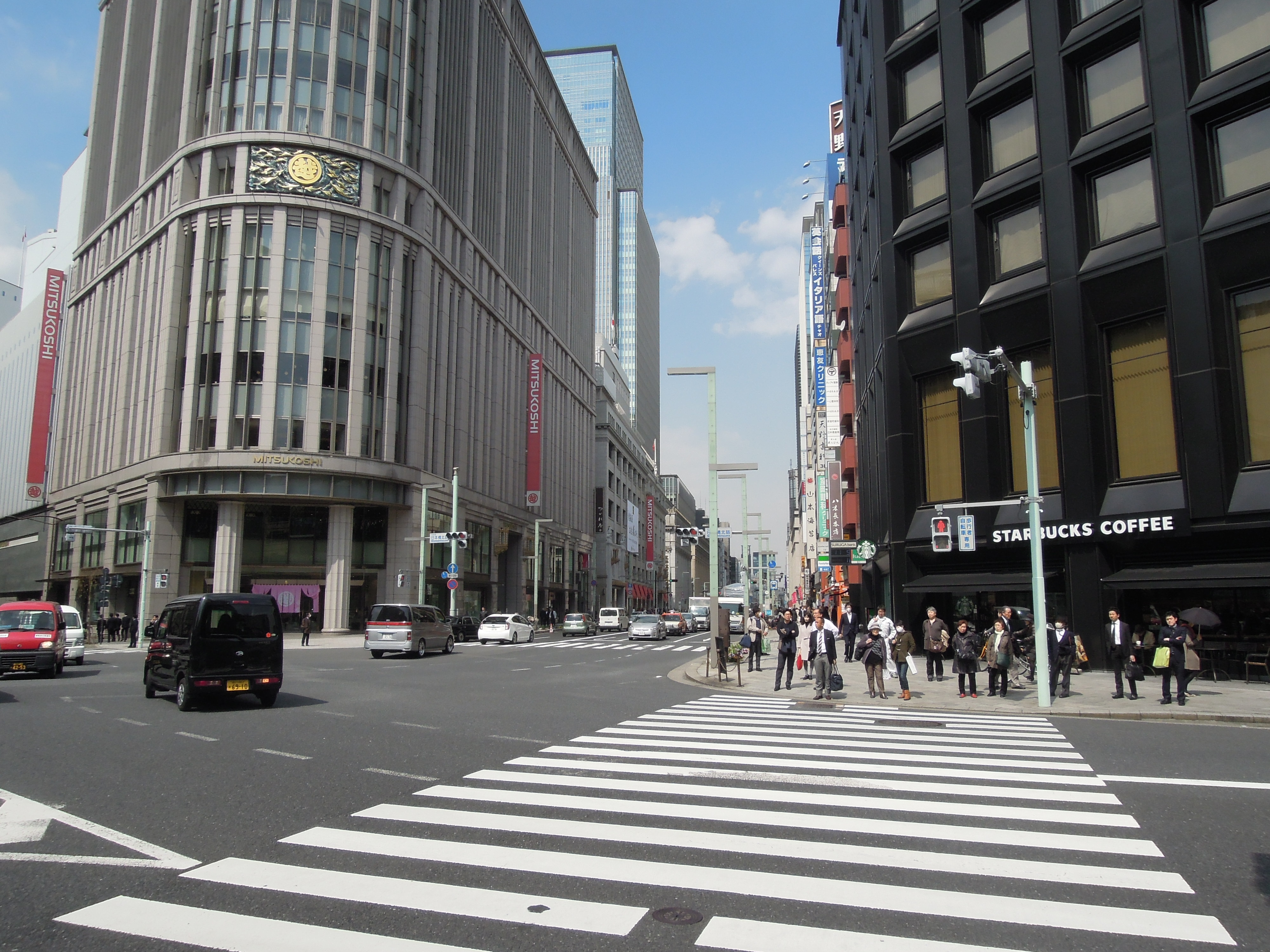
Chūō-dōri (Central Avenue)

There is no artist's signature or record about the reason for commissioning the work. The work was likely commissioned by a warrior or wealthy merchant. The title, Kidai shōran, means “superior scenery of a brilliant age”. The commissioner must have wanted to bequeath an image of Edo's prosperity of the time to future generations. However, the incorrect later placement of gold leaf placenames on the scroll means that the commissioner or owner at the time was not a local of the area. There are many mistakes in attaching placenames, including the misnaming of Takasago Shindō Street as “Ukiyo-koji” Street at Muromachi 1-chōme, Ukiyo-koji Street at Muromachi 3-chōme is confused with “Goza-ten” shop, and Odawara-machi (now Odawara-shi) is misnamed Oda-chō.

== Discovery ==
The scroll was discovered in the attic of a relative by Professor Hans-Joachim Kuster and his wife Inge in Berlin in 1995. Kuster taught biology at the Free University of Berlin and the Kusters were keen collectors of Chinese art and supporters of the Museum of Asian Art, Berlin. The scroll was donated to the museum as part of the Kuster Collection of Chinese art through a gift arranged by Manfred Bohms prior to 1995. It is unknown how the scroll came to be in the attic of Professor Kuster's relative. The scroll was stored in the Chinese collection of the museum until 1995, when Professor Kuster died and his collection was examined as a result of an inheritance dispute. At that time the Curator of Japanese works in the museum realised that the scroll was not Chinese but in fact a work of art from Japan.

The director of the Museum of Asian Art, Berlin, Willibald Veit then arranged for Tadashi Kobayashi of Gakushuin University to examine the scroll. Kobayashi was giving visiting lectures in Cologne, the Rietberg Museum (Zürich) and the Free University of Berlin. After finishing them, Kobayashi was able to examine the scroll.

The scroll was displayed for the first time in central position at an exhibition to celebrate the opening of the new Japan Galleries of the Museum of Asian Art, Berlin. It then returned to Japan on two occasions. The first was from 5 January to 23 February 2003 at the Edo-Tokyo Museum in an exhibition titled 808 Towns of Great Edo celebrating the 10th anniversary of the opening of the Edo-Tokyo Museum and the 400th anniversary of the establishment of the Edo Shogunate. The second occasion was at the Mitsui Memorial Museum from 7 January to 12 February 2006 in its inaugural exhibition, titled Nihonbashi Picture Scrolls.

Following these exhibitions, a 1.4 times enlarged facsimile was produced by the Nihonbashi Preservation Association and the Nihonbashi Renaissance Committee under the supervision of the Edo-Tokyo Museum. This is now displayed in the underground concourse of Tokyo Metro's Mitsukoshimae Station. Interpretation was provided next to the display, which opened on 30 November 2009.

In 2017, the Edo-Tokyo Museum, in cooperation with the Capital Museum and Palace Museum of Beijing, held an exhibition titled Edo and Beijing: Cities and Urban Life in the 18th Century. In its catalogue, an article by Yūko Eriguchi (江里口友子) draws comparisons between Kidai shōran and an illustrated Chinese text, Wanshou shengdian ("Grand Ceremony for the Imperial Birthday"). It is likely that either the commissioner or the artist of Kidai shōran had access to a copy of the Chinese text: for example, the image of a father taking his young child to his first day of school is identical in both works.

The original scroll remains in the Collection of the Museum of Asian Art, now part of the Humboldt Forum, Berliner Schloss.
