= Yodoya Saburōemon =

Japanese merchant

Yodoya Saburōemon (淀屋三郎右衛門) (1576–1643) was a Japanese wealthy merchant of the early Edo period. His real name was Okamoto Kotomasa. He was commonly called as Yodoya Saburōemon. He was the second head of the first "Yodoya" founded by the Okamoto family. As a merchant of Osaka, he was a prominent rice dealer who worked with various daimyōs. He is known as the developer of Nakanoshima.

The 5th generation Yodoya Tatsugoro held assets of around 200 trillion yen, the first in human history, and remains an unbroken record to this day, but because their own interest would take 350 years just to pay off, was crushed inhumanely by the Edo Shogunate in 1700, it has ever been wiped from the forefront of Japanese history as a dark secret by its successor, the Tokyo Historical View. If the national budget of the Edo Shogunate at the time (about 900 billion yen) were expanded to the size of the modern Japanese government (115.5 trillion yen), it would amount to 5 quadrillion yen, also making it the largest amount of private asset defaulted on by a government in the world.
