= Iki (aesthetics) =

Japanese aesthetical ideal of subdued expressions of taste and wealth

Iki (粋/いき, roughly "chic, stylish") is a Japanese aesthetical ideal of subdued displays of taste and/or wealth, with an emphasis on belying, on first glance, the efforts taken to appear stylish. It is thought to have originated amongst the merchant classes of Edo (modern-day Tokyo) in Edo period Japan, subverting class through an expression of material wealth that formed an aesthetic language specifically aimed at one's peers.

Sometimes misunderstood in the West as the archetypal or stereotypical aesthetics of Japanese culture, Iki is instead a cornerstone of traditional Japanese aesthetic appeal and thought. Both geisha and kimono, amongst other cultural aspects, are thought to have been influenced by and developed through iki, and remain largely influenced by it to this day.

== History ==
During the Edo period, a number of edicts were passed by the ruling samurai classes restricting expressions of material wealth by those officially lower in the social hierarchy as a way of preserving the status of the upper classes; this included edicts of dress preventing the lower classes from visibly appearing to be above their social class. Though dress edicts had little impact on much of the working classes, who had little access to wealth allowing them to purchase new and expensive silk kimono, the merchant classes – socially impoverished but monetarily powerful – were directly hit by these laws, as changes had, over time, led them to control much of Japan's economy.

This led to the development of iki as an expression of the now-underground nature of the merchant classes' wealth; to obey the law was too safe, and to blatantly flout it too dangerous, leading to the rise of iki as both a visual dogwhistle and a neo-hierarchy within a specific societal peer group.

By too flagrant a display of his affluence, a townsman ran the risk of having his wealth confiscated. A merchant's home therefore was likely to have had an unassuming exterior, yet to have been full of treasures. He might have worn a sober, plain wool kimono – with an exquisite silk lining. Opulence was channeled into subtle details.

In this way, both the samurai and lower working classes were considered devoid of iki, with the former having to display wealth with no subtlety as a form of social dominance, and the latter having no access to any kind of opulence, and no choice to appear as anything but impoverished.

Despite this, individual warriors considered to be upper class came to be depicted commonly as embodying iki, typically through ideals of a clear, stylish manner and blunt, unwavering directness, regardless of circumstance, heartbreak or individual feeling; stories of rogue warriors choosing duty (giri) over often pained and tormented personal feelings (ninjō) became popular stories in kabuki, a form of theatre popular within the merchant classes.

Geisha also came to be seen as iki, not just for their contrasting and subdued appearance in the face of flashier courtesans, but for their reputation as unwaveringly loyal. A popular name for the pleasure quarters, the karyūkai (lit. 'the flower and willow world'), described courtesans (the beautiful but fleeting flowers) and geisha (the resilient willow, often bending in fierce weather but never snapping) as contrasting elements, with geisha embodying loyalty to their patrons. This concept came to embody geisha so entirely that rival political factions often patronised entirely different geisha quarters, with the geisha of each staying loyal to their customers. Geisha, alongside rogue warriors, also became the common subject of many kabuki plays revolving around duty versus one's own feelings.

The term iki became widespread in modern intellectual circles through the book The Structure of Iki (1930) by Kuki Shūzō.

== Interpretation ==
The term iki is commonly used in both conversation and writing, having had a lasting effect on the development and continuation of Japanese aesthetics in the modern day, despite not necessarily being considered exclusive of other categories of Japanese aesthetic concepts and ideals, such as wabi-sabi.

Iki is considered to be an expression of carefully calculated simplicity, the ideal being that a mundane appearance would be considered iki in the context of the viewer's understanding of the effort undertaken to achieve the result. Iki also encompasses ideals of spontaneity and originality, with it being considered stylish to appear spontaneous and carefree, even if the efforts undertaken to appear as such happen to be considerably involved; a lack of self-consciousness, and being considered naturally, casually chic are core concepts of being considered iki. Though the nature of iki may be considered the antithesis of other Japanese aesthetics such as kawaii, at times, iki may exhibit traits of other aesthetics in a direct and unabashed manner.

Iki is not used to describe natural phenomena, but may be expressed in an appreciation of natural beauty, or of nature of human beings. The writings of author Murakami Haruki (born 1949) are considered to be iki through their clear and unflinching writing style. In contrast, author Kawabata Yasunari (1899–1972) is considered, through his more poetic style focusing on the interior "complex" of his characters, to be more closely aligned with the aesthetic ideal of wabi-sabi, displaying that the concept of iki is strongly tied to stylistic tendencies.

== Tsū ==
The indefinite ideal of tsū (通) can be said to reference a highly cultivated (but not necessarily solemn) sensibility, or a refined understanding of a particular matter. Tsū is used, for example, in knowing how to properly appreciate (eat) Japanese cuisines (sushi, tempura, soba etc.), or in judging the quality of wine. Tsū can be transferred from person to person in form of "tips." As Tsū is more focused in knowledge, it may be considered superficial from an iki point of view, since iki cannot be easily attained by learning.

Iki and tsū are considered synonymous in some situations, but tsū exclusively refers to persons, while iki can also refer to situations/objects. In both ideals, the property of refinement is not academic in nature. Tsū sometimes involves excessive obsession and cultural (but not academic) pedantry, and in this case, it differs from iki, which will not be obsessive.

Overall, the iki/tsu sensibility resists being construed within the context of overly specific rules about what could be considered as vulgar or uncouth.

== Yabo ==
Yabo (野暮) is the antonym of iki. Busui (無粋), literally "non-iki", is synonymous to yabo.

== Sui ==
In the Kamigata or Kansai area, the ideal of sui is prevalent. Sui is also represented by the kanji 粋. The sense of sui is similar to iki but not identical, reflecting various regional differences. The contexts of their usages are also different.

== See also ==
- Ukiyo
- Brutalism, characterised by a minimalist style in architecture.
