= Edo =

Historical name of Tokyo until 1868

Edo 江戸 (えど)
- Former city
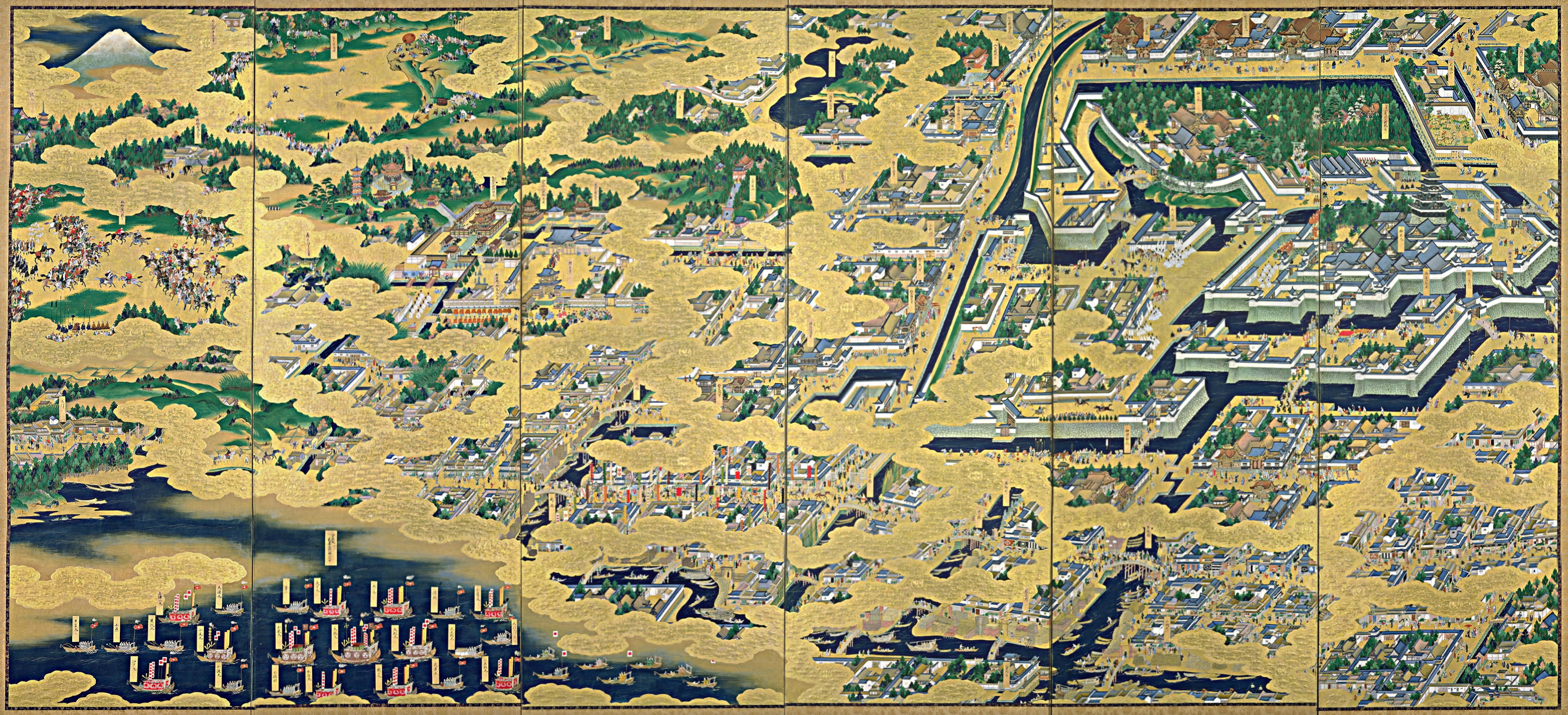
- Folding screen view of Edo in the 17th century, showing Edo Castle on the upper right corner

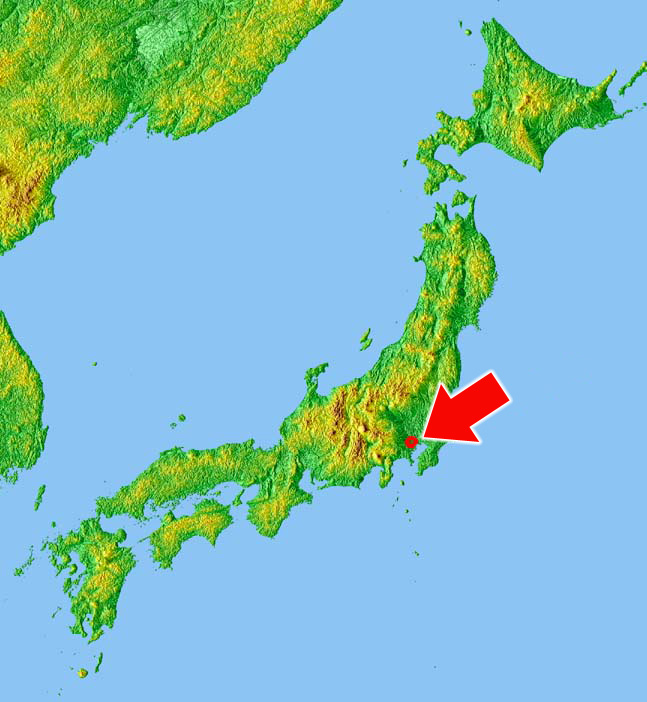
- Location of the former city of Edo
- Coordinates: 35°41′02″N 139°46′28″E
- Country: Japan
- Province: Musashi
- Edo Castle built: 1457
- Capital of Japan (De facto): 1603
- Renamed Tokyo: 1868

Government
  - Type of leader: Feudal government

Population (1721)
  - Total: 1,000,000

Edo (江戸; lit. 'bay-entrance'; English: /ˈɛd.oʊ/; Japanese: [è̞.dó̞]), also romanized as Jedo, Yedo or Yeddo, is the former name of Tokyo.

Under the Tokugawa shogunate, Edo developed into a major early-modern urban centre with a population that is believed to have exceeded 1 million by the early 18th century — making it, by many estimates, the largest city in the world at the time.

Edo’s population and urban footprint expanded significantly due to deliberate policies, including land reclamation around Edo Bay, planned street layouts, large samurai residential areas, and an extensive system of waterways supporting transportation and commerce. The city was home to samurai officials, townspeople (chōnin), and artisans, and served as a centre of economic activity, urban cultural practices, and administrative organization during the Tokugawa era.

Following the overthrow of the Tokugawa shogunate in 1868, the city formerly known as Edo was renamed Tōkyō ("Eastern Capital"), and the emperor’s residence was moved there from Kyoto, establishing Tokyo as the capital of Japan. The development of Edo during the Tokugawa period (1603‑1868) influenced the later growth and urban character of Tokyo after the Meiji Restoration.

== History ==
=== Before Tokugawa ===
Before the 10th century, there is no mention of Edo in historical records, but for a few settlements in the area. That name for the area first appears in the Azuma Kagami chronicles, which have probably been used since the second half of the Heian period. Edo's development started in the late 11th century with a branch of the Kanmu-Taira clan (桓武平氏) called the Chichibu clan (秩父氏) coming from the banks of the then-Iruma River, present-day upstream of the Arakawa river. A descendant of the head of the Chichibu clan settled in the area and took the name Edo Shigetsugu (江戸重継), likely based on the name used for the place, and founded the Edo clan. Shigetsugu built a fortified residence, probably around the edge of the Musashino Terrace, that would become Edo castle. Shigetsugu's son, Edo Shigenaga (江戸重長), took the Taira's side against Minamoto no Yoritomo in 1180 but eventually surrendered to Minamoto and became a gokenin for the Kamakura shogunate. At the fall of the shogunate in the 14th century, the Edo clan took the side of the Southern Court, and its influence declined during the Muromachi period.

In 1456, a vassal of the Ōgigayatsu branch of the Uesugi clan started to build a castle on the former fortified residence of the Edo clan and took the name Ōta Dōkan. Dōkan lived in the castle until his assassination in 1486. Under Dōkan, with good water connections to Kamakura, Odawara and other parts of Kanto and the country, Edo expanded as a jōkamachi, with the castle bordering a cove (now Hibiya Park) opening into Edo Bay, and the town developing along the Hirakawa River running into the cove, and on Edomaeto (江戸前島), the stretch of land on the eastern side of the cove (now roughly where Tokyo Station is). Some priests and scholars fleeing Kyoto after the Ōnin War came to Edo during that period.

After the death of Dōkan, the castle became one of strongholds of the Uesugi clan, which fell to the Later Hōjō clan at the battle of Takanawahara in 1524, during the expansion of their rule over the Kantō area.

When the Hōjō clan was finally defeated by Toyotomi Hideyoshi in 1590, the Kanto area was given to rule to Toyotomi's senior officer Tokugawa Ieyasu, who took his residence in Edo.

=== Ieyasu's initial urban vision and the transformation of an unformed settlement (1590–1603) ===
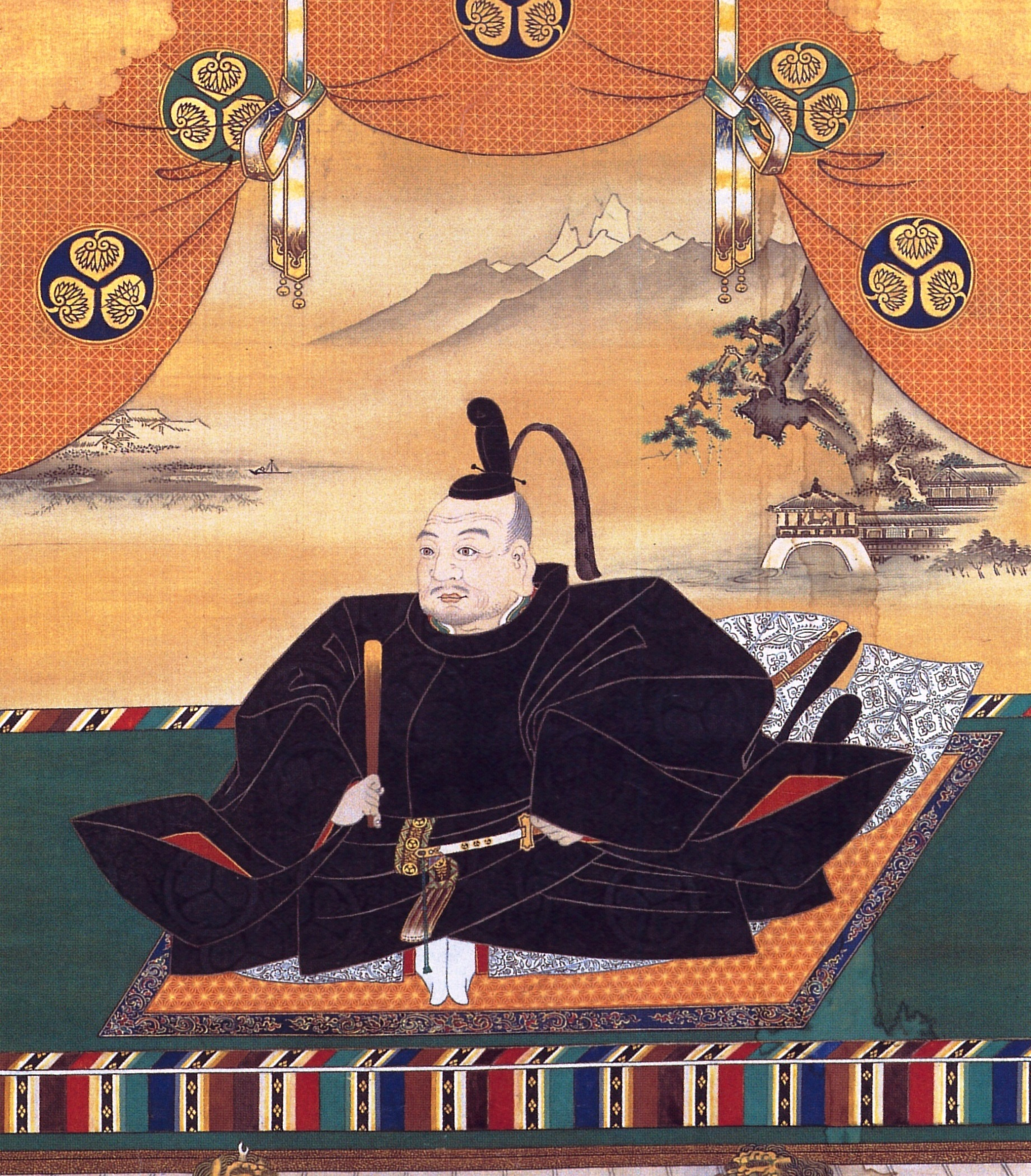
Tokugawa Ieyasu

When Tokugawa Ieyasu first entered Edo in 1590, the area was not yet a town or city in any meaningful sense. What existed was a small fortified residence—commonly called “Edo Castle” (Edo-jō)—consisting of only a handful of (small) buildings standing on the edge of the Musashino Plateau. To the east of the residence stretched nothing but wetlands, tidal inlets, marshes, and patches of undeveloped wasteland. There was no urban district, no planned streets, and no concentrated population.

Recognizing the strategic potential of the site, Ieyasu immediately initiated surveys of the surrounding topography, focusing on the plateau, the Hibiya inlet（日比谷入り江）, and the low-lying marshland east of the "castle". These surveys formed the basis of his first deliberate urban plan. Under his direction, early engineering works began: preliminary modification of the Hibiya inlet, initial attempts to redirect the Hirakawa River, and the earliest stages of constructing outer moats and functional canals.

Although large-scale land reclamation and restructuring would accelerate only after Ieyasu's victory at the Battle of Sekigahara in 1600, the fundamental conceptual blueprint for transforming Edo from an undeveloped landscape into a governable urban center was already established during this period. This development was not spontaneous or natural—Edo's growth began as an intentional political and military project shaped directly by Ieyasu's vision and administrative control.

=== Tokugawa shogunate ===
Tokugawa Ieyasu emerged as the paramount warlord of the Sengoku period following his victory at the Battle of Sekigahara in October 1600. He formally founded the Tokugawa shogunate in 1603 and established his headquarters at Edo Castle. Edo became the center of political power and the de facto capital of Japan, although the historic capital of Kyoto remained the de jure capital as the seat of the emperor. Edo grew from a fishing village in Musashi Province in 1457 into the largest metropolis in the world, with an estimated population of 1 million by 1721.

The Great Reconstruction (1603–1630s)

After the shogunate was firmly established and especially after 1615, the Tokugawa regime undertook massive expansion works under Tenka-Bushin (天下普請) :

- Expansion of Edo Castle into one of the largest fortified complexes in the world
- Large-scale cutting of the Musashino Plateau for earth
- Reclamation of coastlines throughout Edo Bay (Nihonbashi, Kyōbashi, Tsukiji, etc.)
- Excavation of the Kanda River
- Construction of a vast water-control and canal network

The city expanded primarily eastward into reclaimed land, forming the basis of Shitamachi (下町), where townspeople (chōnin, 町人) lived and worked. Large-scale construction after 1600 was undertaken through shogunate-imposed public works known as Tenka-bushin (天下普請), which were financed and carried out by the daimyōs and their retainers. Although commonly described as “public works”, these projects were in fact compulsory obligations: the shogunate issued the plans, and the daimyō were required to allocate enormous funds and mobilize their retainer bands or hired laborers to execute them. This system enabled the Tokugawa regime to reshape Edo's topography on a massive scale, transforming wetlands and coastal shallows into new urban districts.

These early projects laid the conceptual and physical groundwork for Edo's later transformation into a major political and urban center.

Development under the Second Shogun, Tokugawa Hidetada (1605–1623)

Under Tokugawa Hidetada, Edo's urban planning was expanded and systematized. Key developments during his tenure included:

- Expansion of Edo Castle's administrative and residential compounds
- Systematic layout of streets, bridges, and residential quarters for samurai, townspeople (chōnin), and temple/shrine precincts
- Early water supply initiatives, including preliminary works that would later contribute to the Kanda and Tamagawa waterworks
- Continued reclamation and development of lowlands along the eastern riverbanks

Hidetada's efforts consolidated Edo's status as the shogunate's administrative center and improved the city's livability, particularly for samurai and townspeople alike.

Development under the Third Shogun, Tokugawa Iemitsu (1623–1651)

Tokugawa Iemitsu oversaw the most ambitious infrastructural developments to date, with large-scale urban engineering projects and water supply systems. Notable accomplishments included:

- Construction of the Tamagawa Aqueduct (Tamagawa-jōsui, 玉川上水), completed in 1653, which transported water from the Tama River to Edo for drinking and firefighting purposes
- Expansion of the Kanda Aqueduct (Kanda-jōsui, 神田上水) to supply central districts, temples, and shrines
- Extensive canal and moat works connecting rivers and facilitating transport and flood control
- Further reclamation of coastal and marshland areas, enabling new districts to be established, particularly in the Shitamachi (下町) region
- Reinforcement and expansion of Edo Castle fortifications, as well as improved road access linking the castle to provincial routes

These projects under Iemitsu not only ensured reliable water supply and sanitation but also transformed Edo's topography into a structured, resilient urban landscape capable of supporting a rapidly growing population. By mid-17th century, Edo had become one of the largest and most systematically planned cities in the world, setting the stage for its peak population and urban complexity in the 18th century.

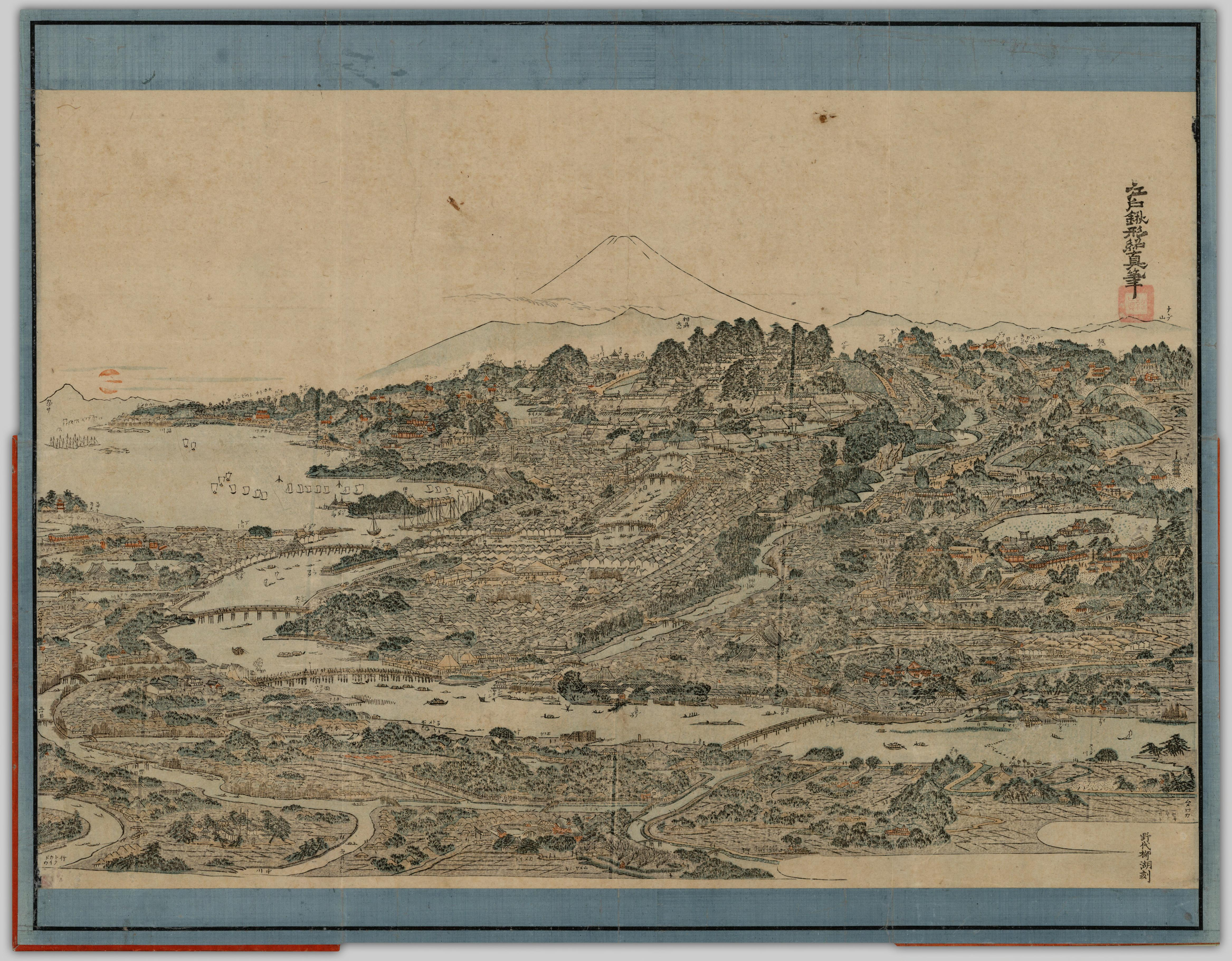
Famous places of Edo in 1803

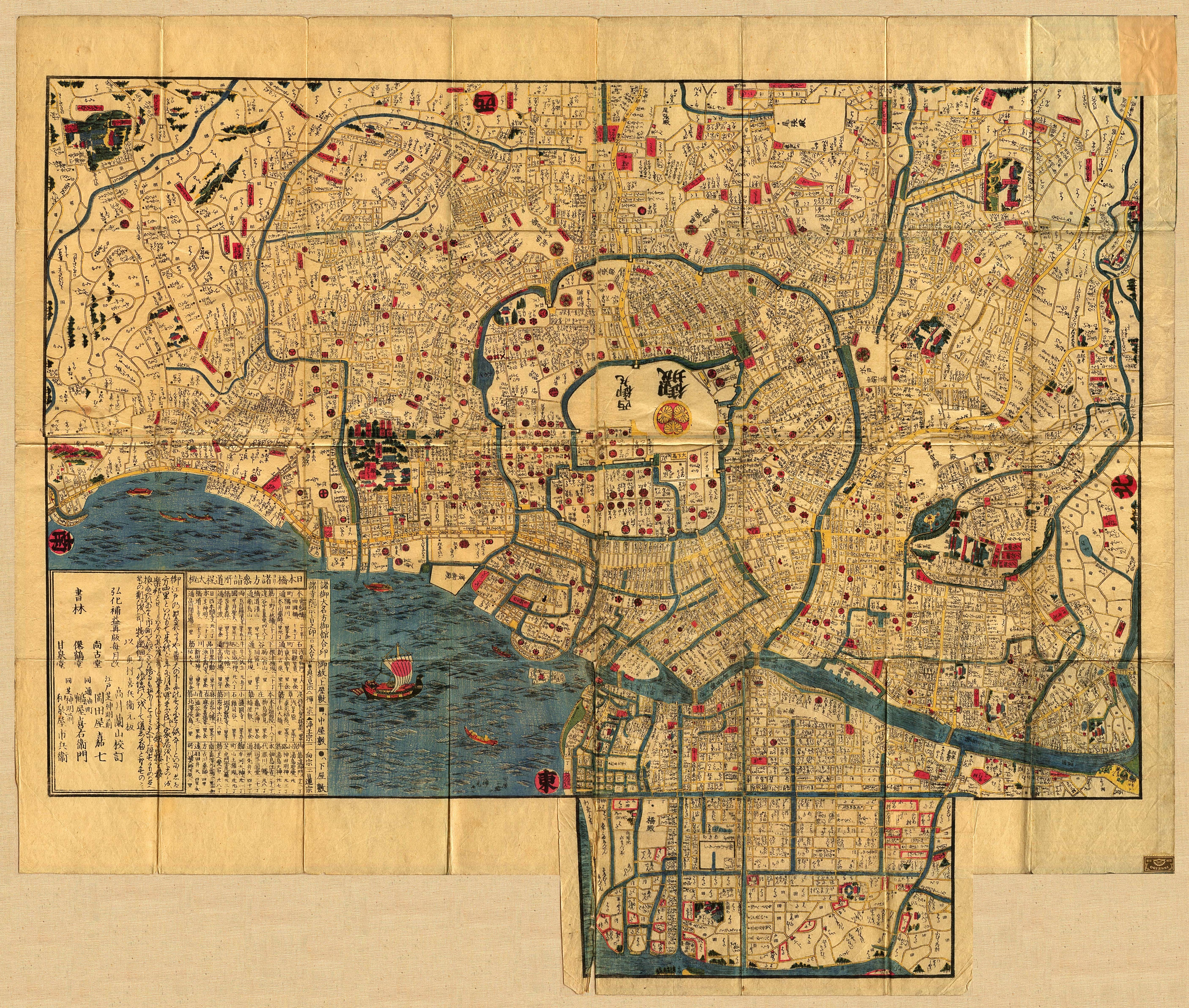
Map of Edo in the 1840s

== Urbanism ==
Very quickly after its inception, the shogunate undertook major works in Edo that drastically changed the topography of the area, notably under the Tenka-Bushin (天下普請) nationwide program of major civil works involving the now pacified daimyō workforce. The Hibiya cove facing the castle was soon filled after the arrival of Ieyasu, the Hirakawa river was diverted, and several protective moats and logistical canals were dug (including the Kanda river), to limit the risks of flooding. Landfill works on the bay began, with several areas reclaimed during the duration of the shogunate (notably the Tsukiji area). East of the city and of the Sumida River, a massive network of canals was dug.

Fresh water was a major issue, as direct wells would provide brackish water because of the location of the city over an estuary. The few fresh water ponds of the city were put to use, and a network of canals and underground wooden pipes bringing freshwater from the western side of the city and the Tama River was built. Some of this infrastructure was used until the 20th century.

=== General layout of the city ===
The city was laid out as a castle town around Edo Castle, which was positioned at the tip of the Musashino terrace. The area in the immediate proximity of the castle consisted of samurai and daimyō residences, whose families lived in Edo as part of the sankin-kōtai system; the daimyō made journeys in alternating years to Edo and used the residences for their entourages. The location of each residence was carefully attributed depending on their position as tozama, shinpan or fudai. It was this extensive organization of the city for the samurai class which defined the character of Edo, particularly in contrast to the two major cities of Kyoto and Osaka, neither of which were ruled by a daimyō or had a significant samurai population. Kyoto's character was defined by the Imperial Court, the court nobles, its Buddhist temples and its history; Osaka was the country's commercial center, dominated by the chōnin or the merchant class. On the contrary, the samurai and daimyō residences occupied up to 70% of the area of Edo. On the east and northeast sides of the castle lived the chōnin (町人; "townspeople") including shomin (庶民; "commoner") in a much more densely populated area than the samurai class area, organized in a series of gated communities called machi (町, "town" or "village"). This area, Shitamachi (下町, "lower town" or "lower towns"), was the center of urban and merchant culture. Shomin also lived along the main roads leading in and out of the city. The Sumida River, then called the Great River (大川, Ōkawa), ran on the eastern side of the city. The shogunate's official rice-storage warehouses and other official buildings were located here.

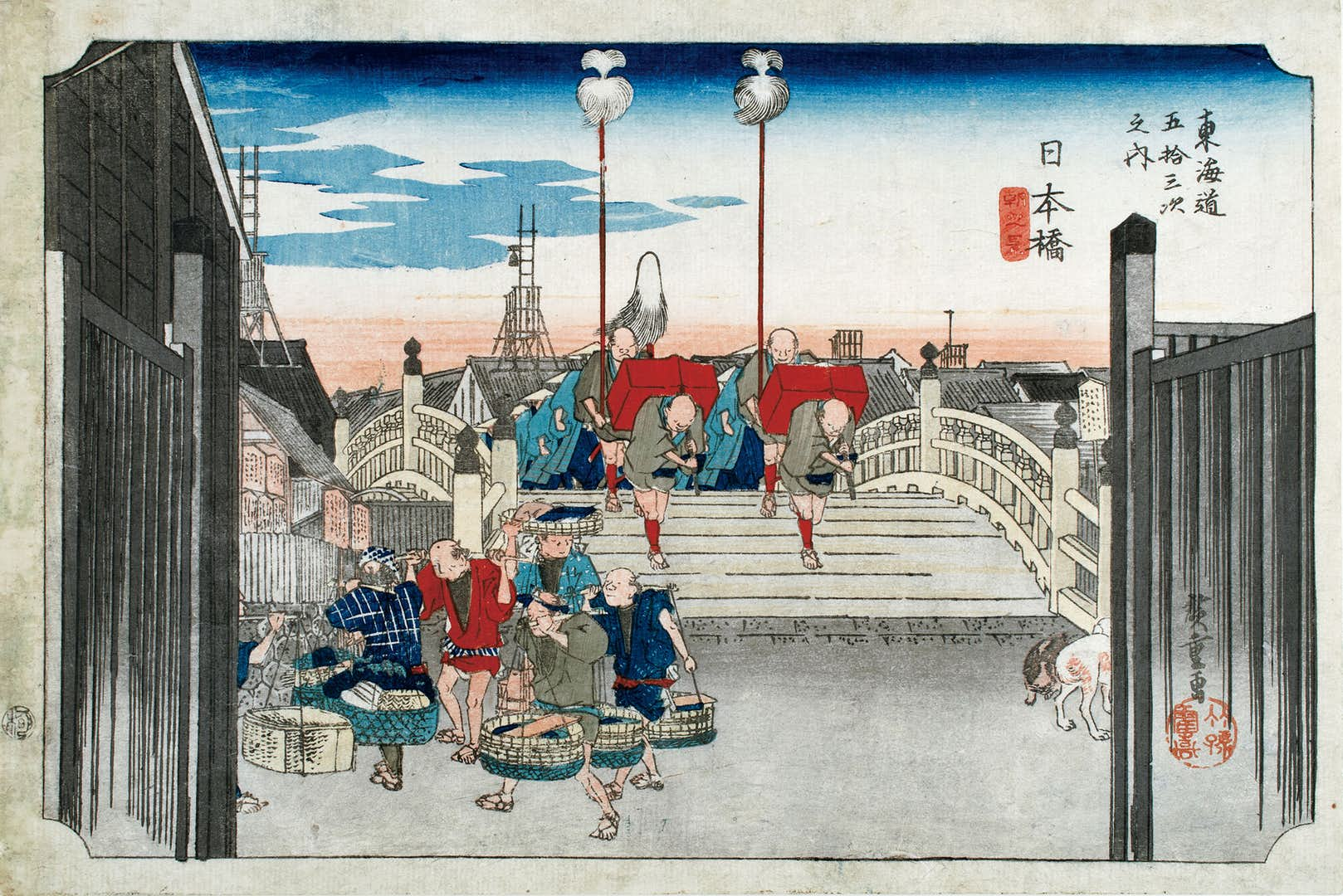
Nihonbashi in Edo, ukiyo-e print by Hiroshige

The Nihonbashi bridge (日本橋; lit. "bridge of Japan") marked the center of the city's commercial center and the starting point of the gokaidō (thus making it the de facto "center of the country"). Fishermen, craftsmen and other producers and retailers operated here. Shippers managed ships known as tarubune to and from Osaka and other cities, bringing goods into the city or transferring them from sea routes to river barges or land routes.

The northeastern corner of the city was considered dangerous in the traditional onmyōdō cosmology and was protected from evil by a number of temples including Sensō-ji and Kan'ei-ji, one of the two tutelary Bodaiji temples of the Tokugawa. A path and a canal, a short distance north of Sensō-ji, extended west from the Sumida riverbank leading along the northern edge of the city to the Yoshiwara pleasure district. Previously located near Ningyōchō, the district was rebuilt in this more remote location after the great fire of Meireki. Danzaemon, the hereditary position head of eta, or outcasts, who performed "unclean" works in the city resided nearby.

Temples and shrines occupied roughly 15% of the surface of the city, equivalent to the living areas of the townspeople, with however an average of one-tenth of its population. Temples and shrines were spread out over the city. Besides the large concentration in the northeast side to protect the city, the second Bodaiji of the Tokugawa, Zōjō-ji occupied a large area south of the castle.

=== Housing ===
==== Military caste ====
The samurai and daimyōs residential estates varied dramatically in size depending on their status. Some daimyōs could have several of those residences in Edo. The upper residence (上屋敷, kami-yashiki), was the main residence while the lord was in Edo and was used for official duties. It was not necessarily the largest of his residences, but the most convenient to commute to the castle. The upper residence also acted as the representative embassy of the domain in Edo, connecting the shogunate and the clan. The shogunate did not exercise its investigative powers inside the precincts of the residential estate of the upper residence, which could also act as a refuge. The estate of the upper residence was attributed by the shogunate according to the status of the clan and its relation with the Shogun. The middle residence (中屋敷, naka-yashiki), a bit further from the castle, could house the heir of the lord, his servants from his fief when he was in Edo for the sankin-kotai alternate residency, or be a hiding residence if needed. The lower residence (下屋敷, shimo-yashiki), if there was any, was on the outskirts of town, more of a pleasure retreat with gardens. The lower residence could also be used as a retreat for the lord if a fire had devastated the city. Some of the powerful daimyōs residences occupied vast grounds of several dozens of hectares. Maintenance and operations of those residential estates could be extremely expensive. Samurai in service of a specific clan would normally live in the residence of their lord.

The hatamoto samurais, in direct service of the Shogun, would have their own residences, usually located behind the castle on the Western side in the Banchō area.

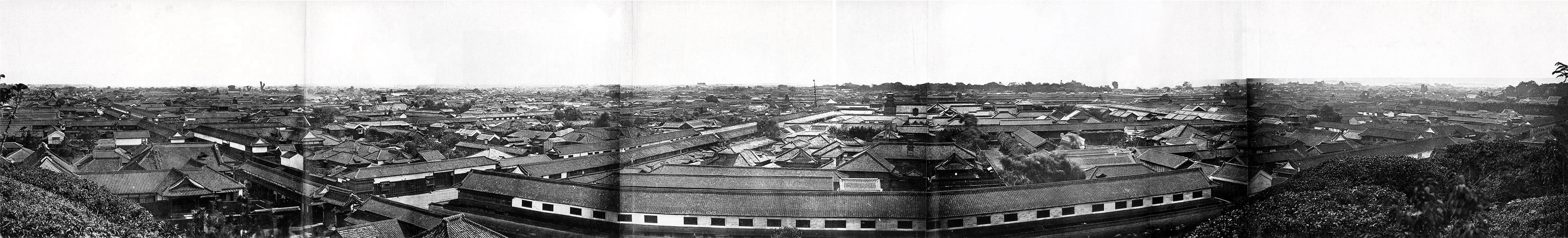
"Panorama of Edo" from Mount Atago(愛宕山), showing the daimyo residences. Photographed by Felice Beato around 1865–1866. This panorama, viewed from Atagoyama, captures Edo shortly before the Meiji Restoration. The Tokugawa shogunate, seeking to protect the city and its inhabitants, surrendered Edo peacefully. Nevertheless, the Meiji authorities subsequently ordered the demolition of many of the city’s grand daimyo residences, bringing an end to a cherished feudal landscape.

==== Townspeople ====
The Common People

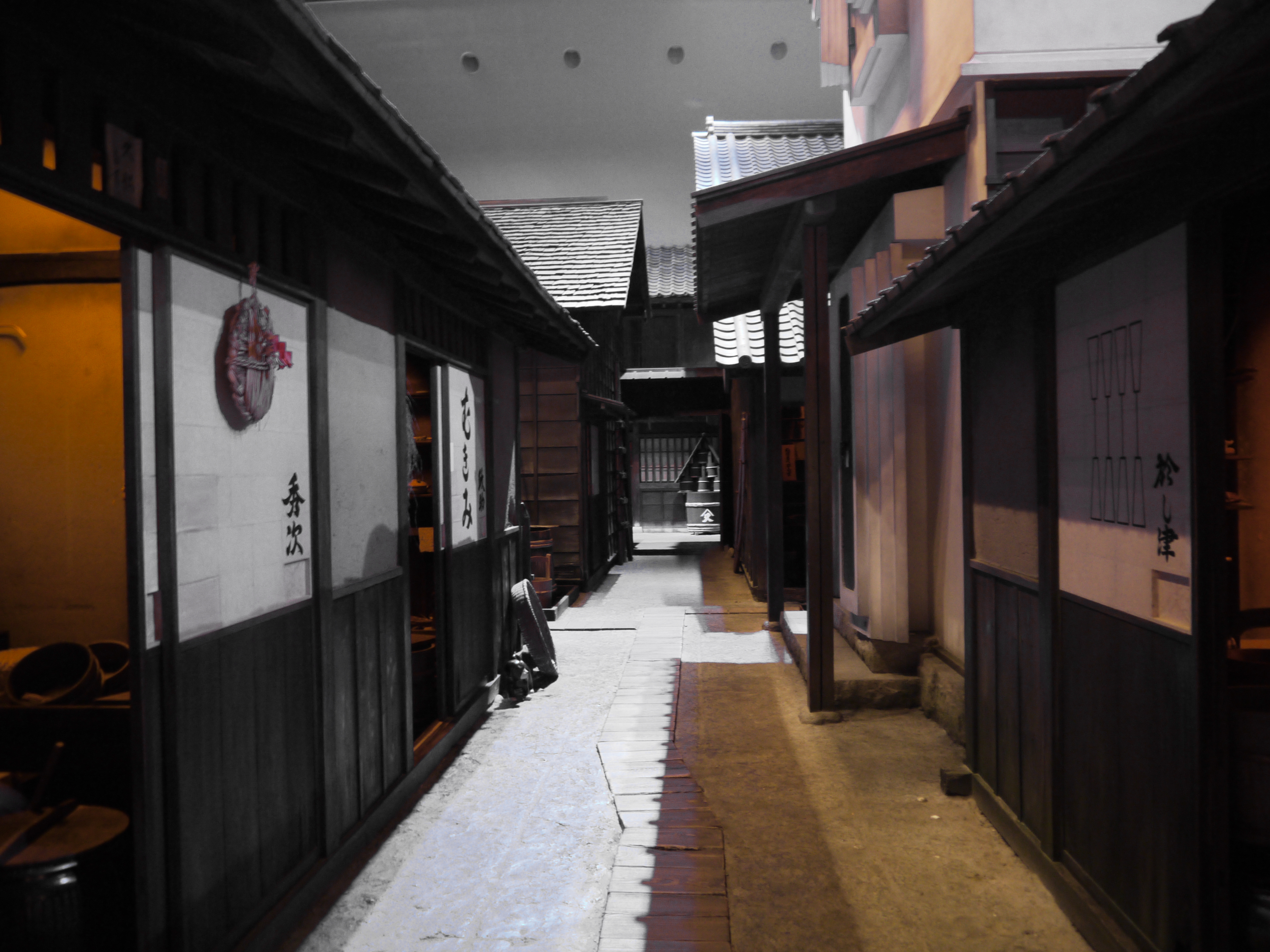
Typical roji and nagaya housing

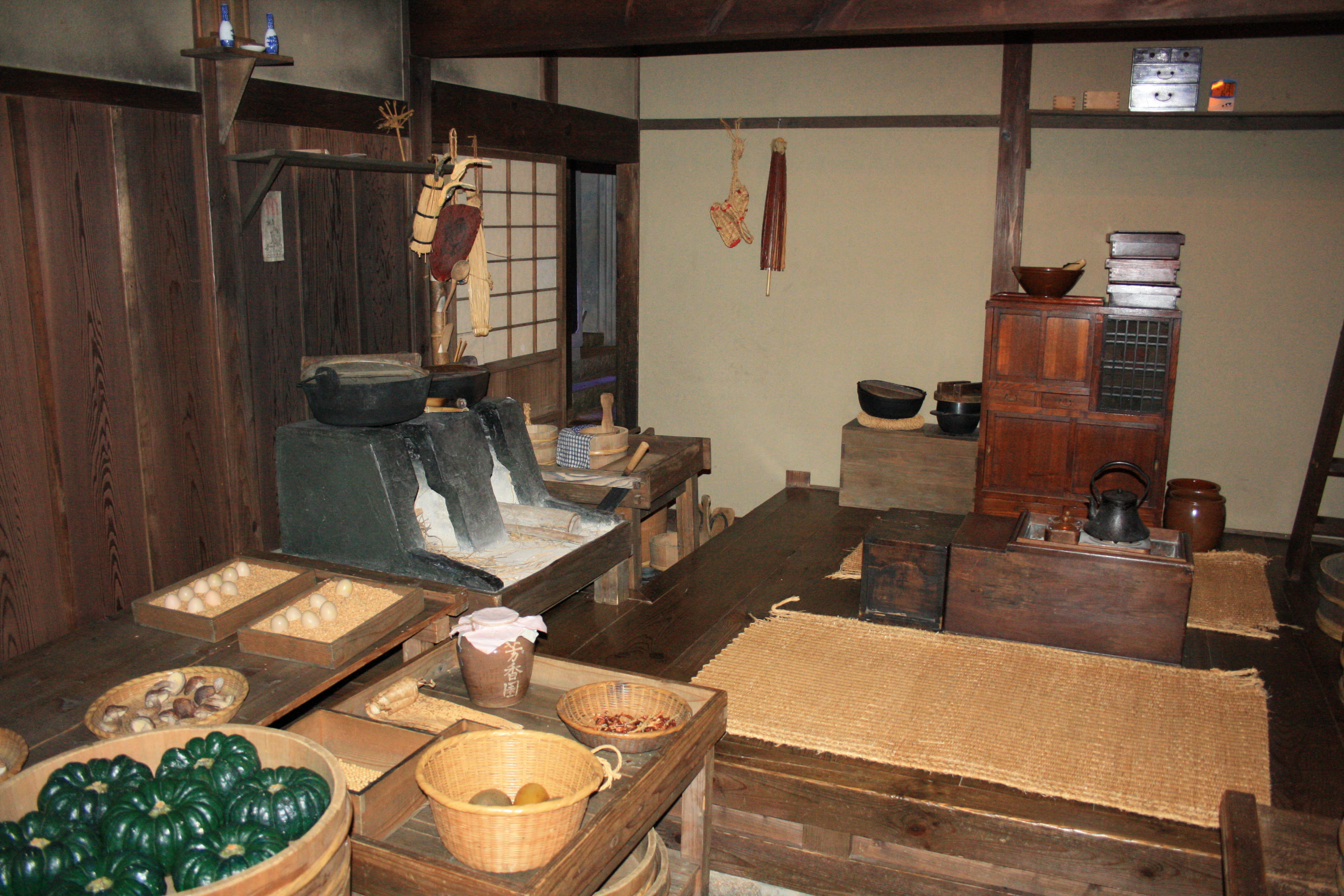
Interior of nagaya (長屋) in a display at the Fukagawa Edo Museum, showing typical living spaces of Edo commoners

Edo was a city with three main social groups: samurai (samurai, 武士), monks (sōryo, 僧侶), and townspeople (chōnin, 町人). Among the townspeople, roughly 70% were commoners (shomin, 庶民), making up about half of the total population of Edo. These commoners lived in modest wooden housing called nagaya (長屋) or ura-nagaya（裏長屋）, which were typically long, single-story row houses, often built along narrow back streets. The commoners who lived in these backstreet nagaya were mostly artisans, craftsmen, laborers, small shop workers, and other lower-income members of the city. Many worked as woodworkers, carpenters, potters, tailors, metalworkers, or food vendors, providing essential goods and services to the community. The larger and more affluent townspeople lived in spacious residences with shops facing the main streets.

The backstreets, or roji (路地), were not merely narrow alleys for passage. They often widened behind their narrow entrances, forming communal spaces similar to Spanish patios or Italian cortiles. These roji served as multifunctional areas where children could play safely under the watchful eyes of their mothers. Women gathered around shared water basins to wash vegetables or laundry, and at the same time, exchanged gossip and news, observing their children at play. This intimate spatial arrangement fostered strong neighborhood ties and created a sense of community.

Each nagaya (長屋) or roji (路地) had a wooden gate called roji-kido (路地木戸) or nagaya-kido (長屋木戸) that could be locked at night. These gates were generally closed around 6 PM (kure-mutsu, 暮六つ) and reopened around 6 AM (ake-mutsu, 明六つ). The keys were held by the nagaya owner or trusted neighbors, helping to prevent late-night intrusions. This system gave residents a sense of safety and helped prevent nighttime crime among the common people, playing a crucial role in maintaining overall public order in Edo.

Shopkeepers and Landlords

In contrast to the compact and communal nagaya in the backstreets, more affluent townspeople operated shops along the main streets, known as omote-dana (表店). These shopkeepers, or ooya (大家, landlords/householders), maintained larger, often two-story buildings, where the first floor was used for business and the second floor for their living quarters. Their prominent placement along the main streets signified both wealth and social status, distinguishing them clearly from the commoners in the backstreets.

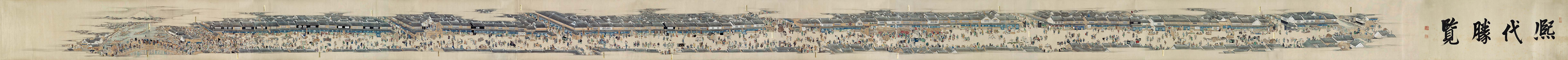
Kidai shōran: by scrolling left, the viewer can see the omote-dana(表店), the shops and residences situated along Edo’s main streets.

== Government and administration ==
Edo's municipal government was under the responsibility of the rōjū, the senior officials who oversaw the entire bakufu – the government of the Tokugawa shogunate. The administrative definition of Edo was called Gofunai (御府内; litt. "where the government is").

The Kanjō-bugyō (finance commissioners) were responsible for the financial matters of the shogunate, whereas the Jisha-Bugyō handled matters related to shrines and temples. The Machi-bugyō (町奉行) were samurai (at the very beginning of the shogunate daimyōs, later hatamoto) officials appointed to keep the order in the city, with the word designating both the heading magistrate, the magistrature and its organization. They were in charge of Edo's day-to-day administration, combining the role of police, judge and fire brigade. There were two offices, the South Machi-Bugyō and the North Machi-Bugyō, which had the same geographical jurisdiction in spite of their name but rotated roles on a monthly basis. Despite their extensive responsibilities, the teams of the Machi-Bugyō were rather small, with 2 offices of 125 people each. The Machi-Bugyō did not have jurisdiction over the samurai residential areas, which remained under the shogunate direct rule. The geographical jurisdiction of the Machi-Bugyō did not exactly coincide with the Gofunai, creating some complexity on the handling on the matters of the city. The Machi-bugyō oversaw the numerous Machi where shonin lived through representatives called Machidoshiyori (町年寄). Each Machi had a Machi leader called Nanushi (名主), who reported to a Machidoshiyori (町年寄) who himself was in charge of several Machis.

== Transportation ==
=== Water transportation ===
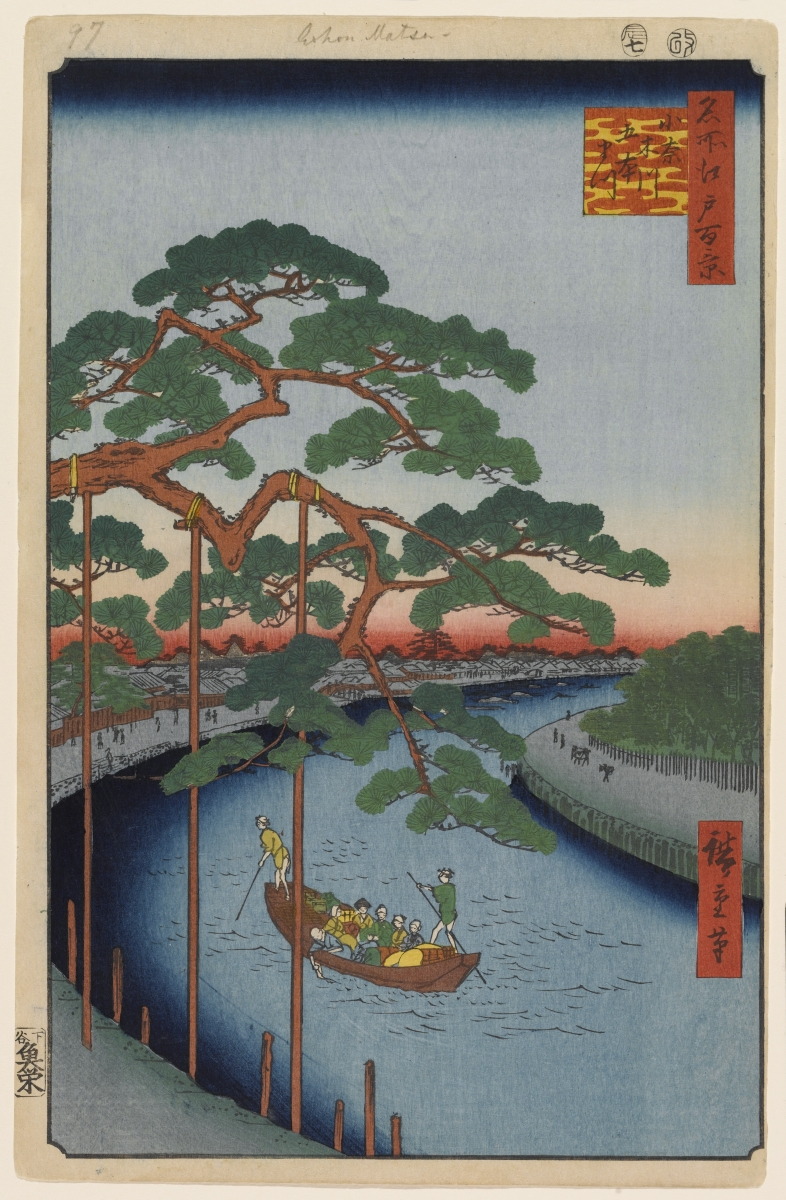
Onagigawa(Onagi River、小名木川)

Water transport served as the logistical backbone of Edo. Bulk cargo, such as rice, timber, charcoal, salt, and other necessities, was carried primarily by boat, since Edo was built on low‑lying terrain with numerous rivers and canals. Studies of urban hydrology estimate that Edo's combined network of rivers, canals, and moats extended for roughly 160–200 kilometers, although the exact figure varies depending on definitional criteria.

A key artery in this network was the Onagigawa (Onagi River、小名木川), an artificial canal ordered by Tokugawa Ieyasu soon after his arrival in Edo, to secure a salt supply route from Gyōtoku to the city. The Onagigawa connected to the Kanda River (神田川) and the Nihonbashi River (日本橋川), forming part of a broader waterway system that linked Edo Castle, peripheral districts, and Edo Bay (present-day Tokyo Bay). Historical studies of Edo logistics note that such canals were deliberately constructed to support large‑scale inland shipping.

Landing points (“kashi”, 河岸) along these waterways functioned as commercial hubs, each specialized in particular cargo—rice wharves, timber wharves, salt wharves, and so on.

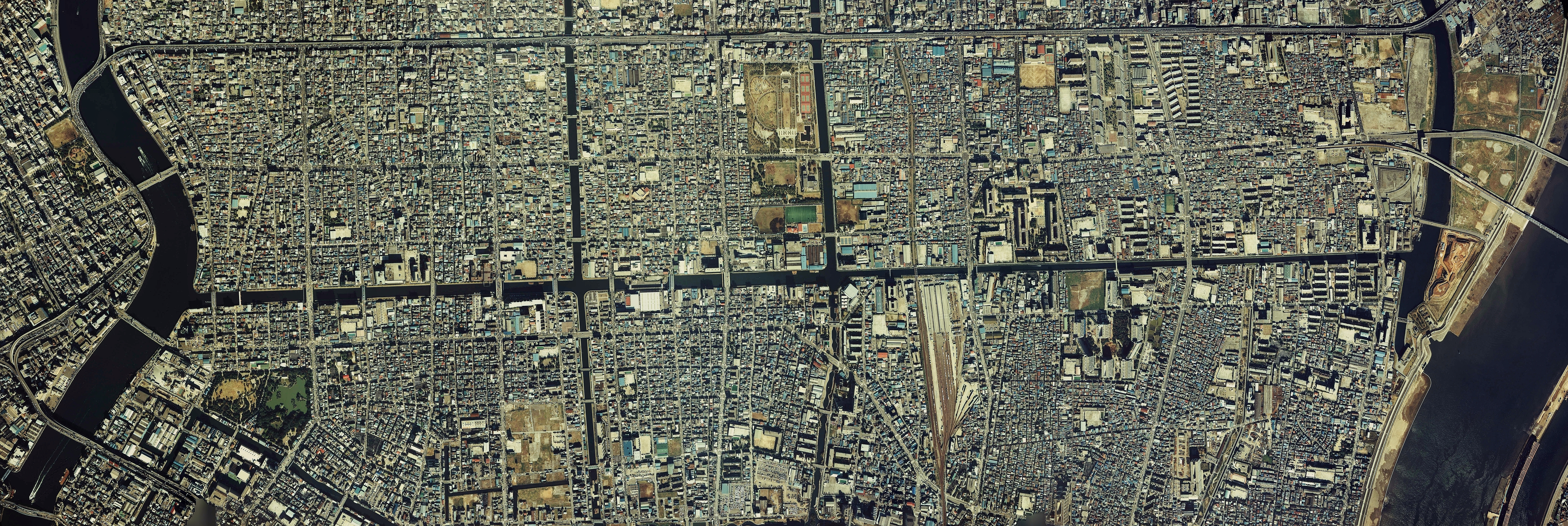
Aerial view of the Onagigawa (小名木川) canal, showing its full stretch from the Sumida River (隅田川) in the west to the Old Nakagawa (旧中川) in the east. The canal, approximately 5.3 kilometers long, was constructed in 1604 under the orders of Tokugawa Ieyasu to transport salt from Gyōtoku to Edo. Even 400 years later, the Onagigawa remains an active waterway, supporting both modern logistics and tourism in Tokyo. (Composite of six photographs taken in 1984）

=== Overland roads ===
From Nihonbashi (日本橋) in Edo, Tokugawa Ieyasu established the Gokaidō (五街道, “Five Highways”), which radiated out to other provinces, forming the centralized road network of the shogunate. These routes served not only for political and military movement (such as sankin-kōtai), but also for commercial and civilian travel.

Within Edo, most people travelled on foot. Officials or wealthy individuals used kago (駕籠) (palanquins), while samurai sometimes rode on horseback. The road infrastructure—including bridges, pathways, and post‑stations—was designed to accommodate both foot and horse traffic, integrating profoundly with the waterborne transport system.

== Economy ==
During the Edo period, the city of Edo functioned as a vast economic center. Its economy was sustained by a complex system of consumption, supply, trade, rental, and resource circulation, shaped by both high-status samurai and townspeople (chōnin, 町人).

=== Consumption and demand ===
Many daimyō (大名) and their retainers, under the sankin-kōtai (参勤交代) obligation, kept residences in Edo, which stimulated constant demand for goods — luxury items, building materials, household furnishings, and food. Their spending power helped drive the city's markets for both everyday and high-quality commodities. In parallel, the townspeople (chōnin, 町人) — merchants and artisans — formed a large, economically active class. Among them, lower-income households made frequent use of rental services to access daily goods without owning them outright.

=== Food supply and distribution ===
Agricultural Produce

Because Edo was densely urbanized with little arable land inside the city, many vegetables, fruits, and other farm products were supplied by the surrounding rural villages. Produce from the nearby lowland areas was delivered daily by boat via Edo's network of canals and waterways. In contrast, produce from the Musashino Plateau (武蔵野台地) was brought into the city overland, carried by farmers on foot or transported by handcarts along gently descending roads leading toward Edo.

Fish and Seafood

Fish and seafood from Edo Bay (modern Tokyo Bay) were landed daily at the Nihonbashi fish quay (日本橋魚河岸). There wholesalers bought from fishers and then distributed to other dealers or retailers. Retail sales included itinerant vendors known as bote-furi (棒手振り), who carried fish in baskets on a balancing pole (tenbin-bō) and walked through neighborhoods selling directly. Contemporary sources suggest that the daily transaction value of the Nihonbashi fish market reached 100 ryō (両) per day, which would be roughly ¥10,000,000 in modern equivalent

=== Salt supply ===
Salt was a staple commodity for Edo households, used not only in cooking but also in food preservation. Production primarily came from coastal salt fields using iri-hama salt production techniques(入浜式). Large volumes of salt from the Seto Inland Sea region and other coastal areas were transported to Edo via sea routes (coastal shipping). In Edo, salt wholesalers (shio-donya, 塩問屋) distributed salt to both merchant households and commoners, helping ensure stable supply for urban consumption.

=== Timber and building materials ===
The need for timber in Edo was immense: virtually all buildings were built of wood, and frequent fires meant constant demand for reconstruction. Much of the timber came from remote forest regions. Notably, the Kiso (木曽, present-day Nagano Prefecture) region was a major supplier: under the so-called Kiso-style log transport method (木曽式伐木運材法), felled logs were floated down the Kiso River on rafts and subsequently shipped by river and by sea to Edo. High-grade woods such as Japanese cypress (hinoki, 檜) from Kiso (木曽) or Kishu (紀州, present-day Wakayama Prefecture) were especially prized and used in samurai residences, temples, and official architecture. In Edo, specialist timber wholesalers (材木問屋) near Nihonbashi, Kanda, and other riverfront locales sold wood to carpenters, builders, and affluent clients. A key center for timber trade and storage was Kiba (木場), established in the Fukagawa area along the Sumida River. The Kiba district was also advantageous because its waterways allowed for water storage (floating logs in fresh or brackish water), preserving timber during transport and stockpiling.

=== Fuel ===
Charcoal (sumi, 炭) was the dominant fuel for cooking and heating in Edo. It was produced from wood and plant residues in managed coppice forests around Edo, for instance in the Tama / Ōme region, which supplied both wood and charcoal. Wood offcuts and residual timber were often burned, and the resultant ash was collected by itinerant ash buyer (hai-gai, 灰買い). This ash was then sold as fertilizer or used in dyeing processes, such as in indigo dyeing (aizome, 藍染), where the alkaline ash-water (haijiru, 灰汁) played a key role.

In short, charcoal production, wood reuse, and ash recycling formed a biomass-based energy and material cycle.

=== Textiles, Clothes, and Clothing Shops ===
Textiles — including silk, hemp, and cotton — played a central role in Edo's economy. These fabrics were produced in regional weaving centers and transported into Edo via coastal and inland water transport. Refined garments such as silk kimono were sold in gofuku-shō (呉服商), i.e., high-end cloth shops targeting samurai and wealthy merchants. Meanwhile, the commons (庶民) acquired more modest clothing through local cloth shops or seamstresses. Some may have made their own garments, but many utilized tailors or seamstresses in longhouse communities to sew, repair, or remake clothes.

=== Rental culture ===
A distinctive feature of Edo's urban economy was its robust rental system, centered on shops called sonryō-ya (損料屋), from sonryō meaning “wear-and-tear compensation” (i.e., depreciation). Items commonly rented included cooking pots, pans, ceramics, futon, ceremonial dress, and travel gear. The business model often included a deposit-like system: when the item was returned undamaged, part of the payment would be refunded. High demand for rentals was driven by the frequent risk of fire in the city, which discouraged accumulation of many personal possessions. Lower-income townspeople in particular relied heavily on rental-shops (sonryō-ya) to furnish their daily lives with minimal capital outlay.

=== Resource circulation and recycling ===
Edo's economy was notable for how thoroughly it reused and recycled materials, forming a highly developed circular economy.

- Paper: Used washi (和紙) was collected by itinerant paper-waste-buyer (kami-kuzu-gai, 紙屑買い), pulped, and re-formed into sukikaeshi paper (漉返紙). Some of the lower-grade recycled paper was used as “toilet paper” or for lightweight writing.
- Ash: As above, ash from charcoal and burned wood was collected by ash-buyer (hai-gai, 灰買い) and reused in agriculture (fertilizer) or for dyeing.
- Metal-scrap and nails: There were itinerant metal-scrap collectors who went through neighborhoods. The metal-scrap collectors sometimes recruited neighborhood children by calling out “totteke-be” (とってけべえ), meaning “take it,” offering small candys or toys as incentives and encouraging them to pick up discarded nails not only from houses but also from backstreets, roji（路地）.
- Repair and reuse: Broken ceramics were repaired by specialists (yakitsugi-shi, 焼継師) who fused shards using a mixture (historically, an adhesive made from lead and other materials) and then refired them.

== Law enforcement ==
In Edo, law enforcement was administered by the machi‑bugyō (town magistrates), a hybrid judicial‑administrative institution rather than a modern police force. These magistrates presided over both criminal justice and municipal governance, supported by samurai assistants and local collaborators. There were two machi‑bugyō offices in Edo — the North and South magistrates — which alternated in managing civic order, investigations, and other legal matters.

Each magistrate office employed a small number of yoriki (与力), higher‑ranking samurai who served as inspectors and administrators, and dōshin (同心), lower-ranked samurai who conducted patrols, guarded prisons, and carried out investigations. According to historical sources, each bugyō office typically had around 25 yoriki and about 120 dōshin, making a total police-administrative staff of about 50 yoriki and 240 dōshin for the city.

Because the formal samurai contingent was limited, the machi-bugyō system also made use of auxiliary assistants known as okappiki (岡っ引), drawn from trusted townspeople by yoriki or dōshin. These men, often familiar with the underworld, aided in intelligence gathering, surveillance, and the apprehension of criminals.

Though not formal government officials, some okappiki were entrusted with a jitte (十手)—a policing symbol—when participating in arrests. Their tasks included registering and profiling suspects (ninsōgaki), collecting tip‑offs, aiding in investigations, and even direct involvement in arrests.

Below the okappiki were the shita-ppiki (下っ引), lower-level helpers who worked under them. They acted as informants, carried out street-level inquiries, and supported okappiki operations. Compensation for both groups was largely informal: okappiki and their subordinates did not receive fixed salaries, but were rewarded by dōshin or yoriki, or shared in bounty payments when cases were resolved.

Through this layered enforcement network — magistrates, samurai, and civilian auxiliaries — Edo managed to maintain public security even though its formal law-enforcement arm was limited in size relative to the city's population.

== Fires ==
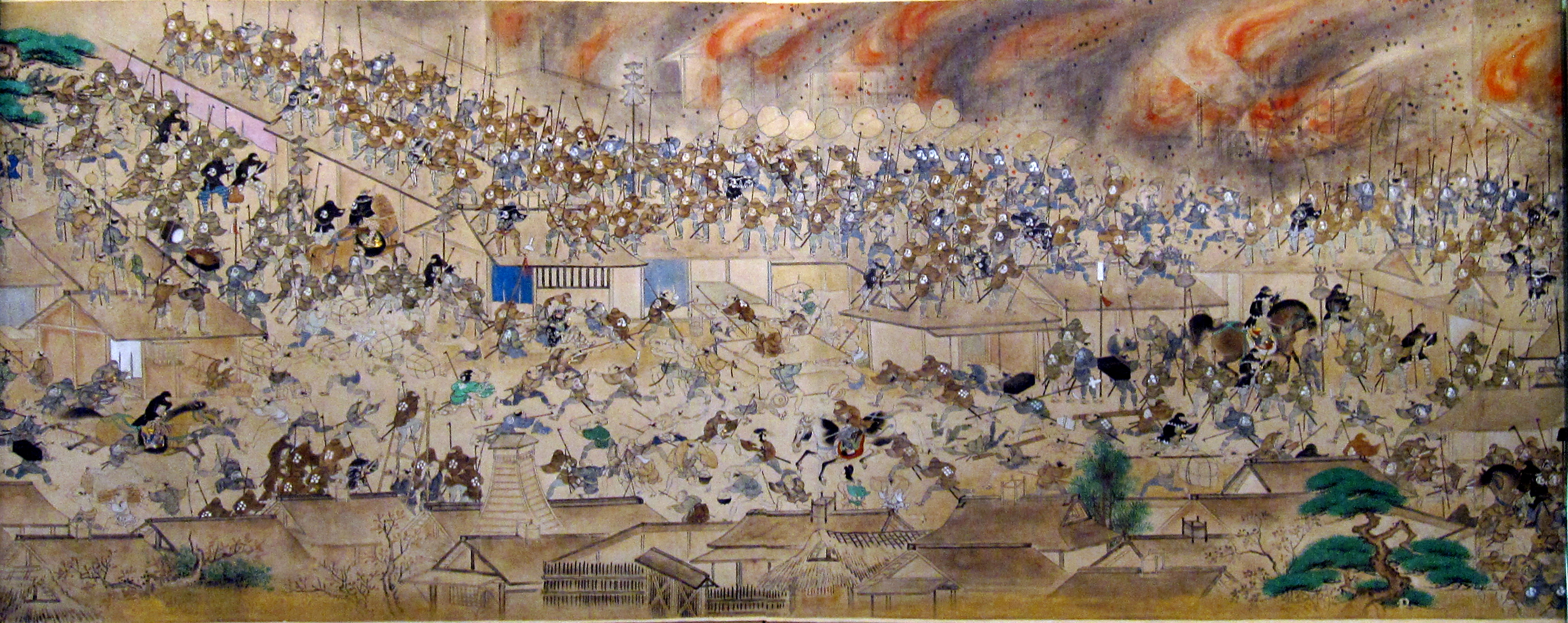
Scroll depicting the Great Fire of Meireki

Edo was repeatedly devastated by fires, the Great Fire of Meireki in 1657 being the most disastrous, with an estimated 100,000 victims and a vast portion of the city completely burnt. The population of Edo was around 300,000, and the impact of the fire was tremendous. The fire destroyed the central keep of Edo Castle, which was never rebuilt, and it influenced the urban planning afterwards to make the city more resilient, with many empty areas to break spreading fires, and wider streets. Reconstruction efforts expanded the city east of the Sumida River, and some daimyō residences were relocated to give more space to the city, especially in the immediate vicinity of the shogun's residence, creating a large green space beside the castle, now the Fukiage gardens of the Imperial Palace. During the Edo period, there were about 100 major fires, mostly begun by accident and often quickly escalating and spreading through neighborhoods of wooden nagaya that were heated with charcoal fires.

=== Firefighting ===
Fire was a perpetual and serious threat in Edo, famously captured in the saying “fire and quarrel are Edo's flowers.” The Great Fire of Meireki in 1657, which devastated a large portion of the city, prompted the formal establishment of firefighting mechanisms.

By the mid‑Edo period, fire suppression was organized through three main types of brigades, hikeshi (火消) :

- (1) daimyō hikeshi (大名火消), raised by certain daimyō from about 1643
- (2) jō-bikeshi (定火消), permanent samurai‑unit firefighters
- and (3) machi‑bikeshi (町火消), town firefighting groups composed of commoners — in particular, tobi (scaffolders) — organized under their own "kumi" (組, units), originally the “Iroha 48” groups. Each machi‑bikeshi carried a matoi (纏), a banner symbolizing its unit, which became a powerful cultural icon of Edo's firefighting tradition.

In this three‑tiered system — daimyō, samurai, and townspeople — Edo combined centralized command with community-based response, creating a resilient fire‑fighting network suited to the city's wooden architecture and dense urban fabric.

== Fall of the shogunate ==
In 1868, the Tokugawa shogunate was overthrown in the Meiji Restoration by supporters of Emperor Meiji and his Imperial Court in Kyoto, ending Edo's status as the de facto capital of Japan. However, the new Meiji government soon renamed Edo to Tōkyō (東京, "Eastern Capital") and the city became the formal capital of Japan when the emperor moved his residence to the city.

== See also ==
- Edo society
- 1703 Genroku earthquake
- Edokko (native of Edo)
- History of Tokyo
- Iki (a Japanese aesthetic ideal)
- Asakusa
