= Chōnin =

Social class in Japan

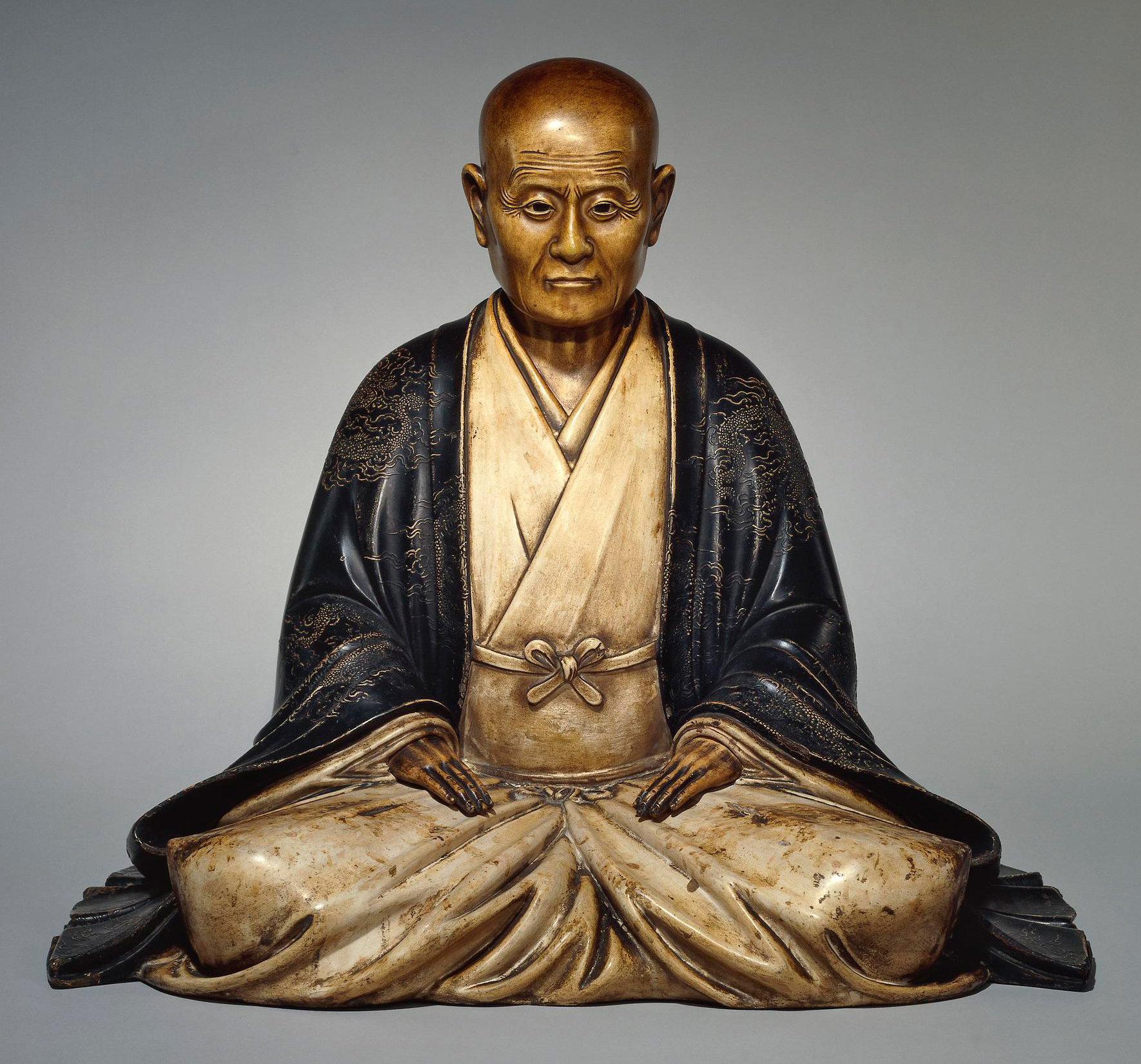
Sculpture of a retired chōnin as a lay Buddhist. It was common for chōnin to take up Buddhism after retirement. Edo period, c. 1700.

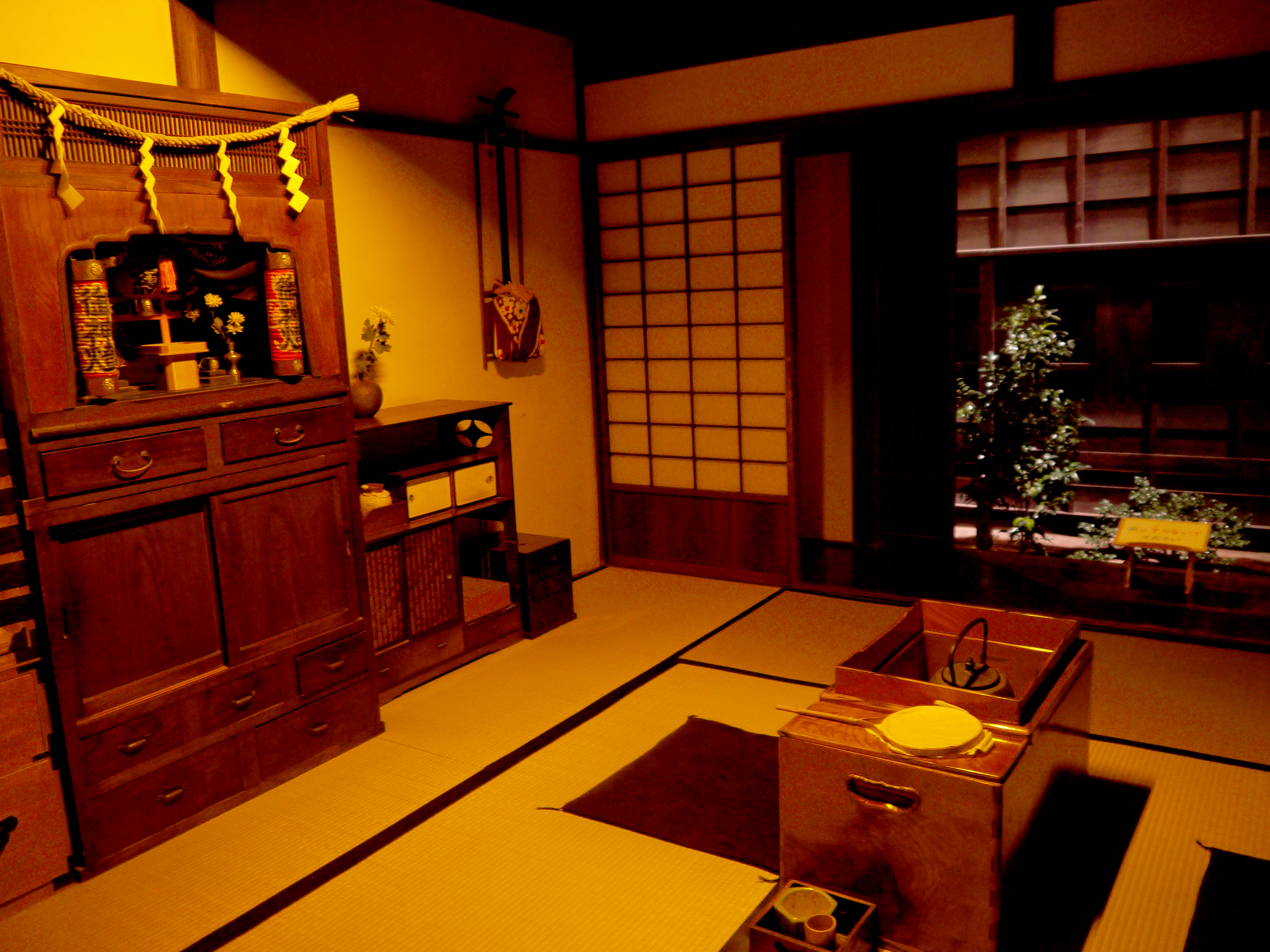
The house of the merchant (Fukagawa Edo Museum)

Chōnin (町人; "townsman") was a social class that emerged in Japan during the early years of the Tokugawa period. The word chōnin comes from the character chō (町) meaning city ward and the character nin (人) meaning person. In the social hierarchy, it was considered subordinate to the samurai warrior class.

The chōnin had a large influence on the prosperity of Edo during the Tokugawa period; playing a key role in the creation of Japanese cultural products and aesthetic ideas.

They also played a large part in the Tokugawa economy, allowing daimyo to trade their goods (mostly rice) for ryō. Chōnin also lent money to daimyo and samurai during this time period, easing the economic burden of the sankin-kōtai system present at the time.

== Origins ==
The chōnin emerged in joka-machi or castle towns during the sixteenth century. The majority of chōnin were merchants, but some were craftsmen. Nōmin (農民; "farmers") were not considered chōnin. Later, peasants, servants, and workers were also considered members of the social class.

Up until the early 17th century, the chōnin population in Edo was significantly smaller than the chōnin populations in cities like Kyoto or Osaka. However, as Edo became more self-sufficient and trade routes became solidified, the chōnin population in Edo increased significantly. By the mid 19th century, Edo's chōnin population rivaled the chōnin population of Kyoto and Osaka combined.

== Social class ==
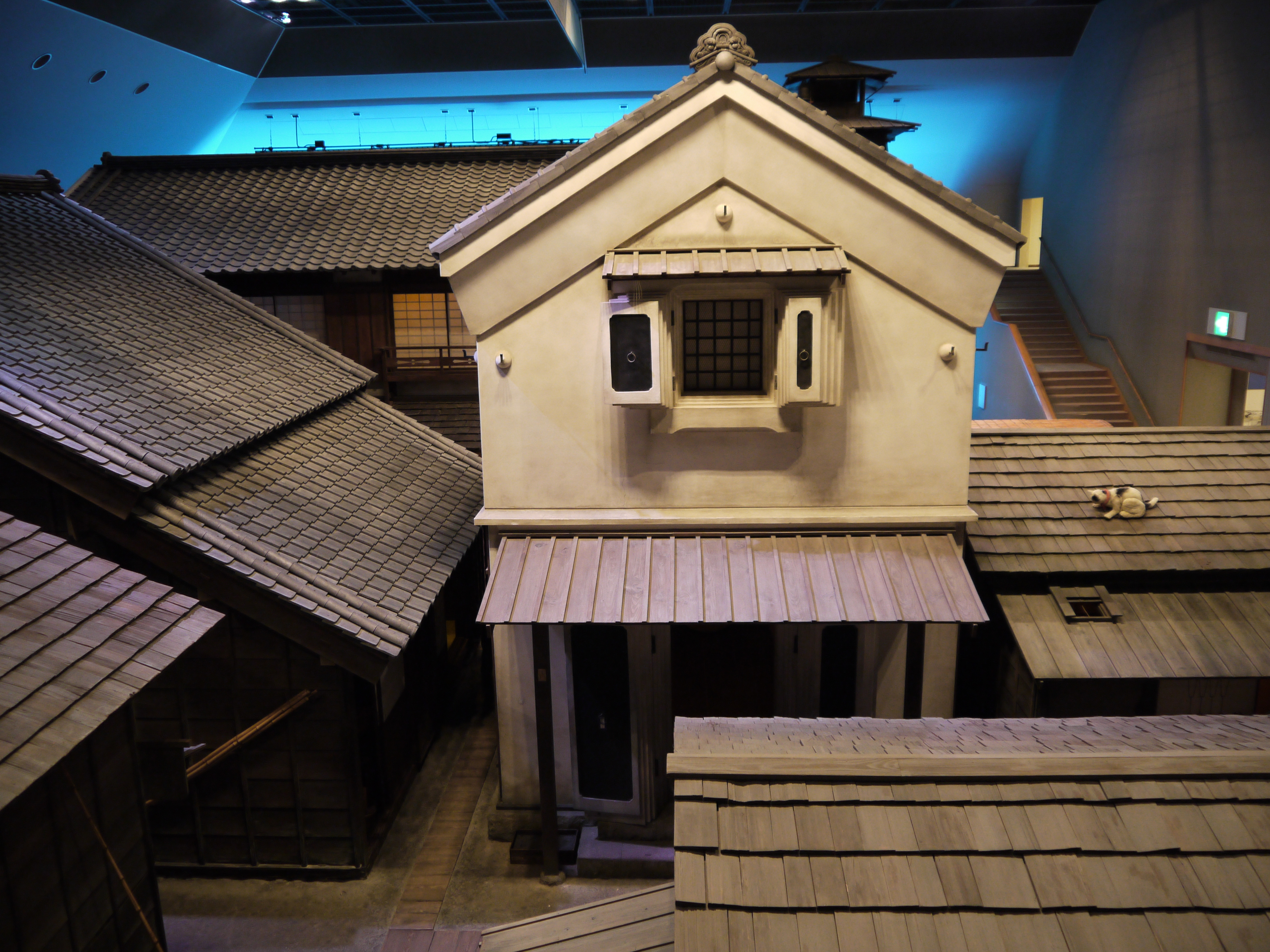
Fukagawa, Edo (Fukagawa Edo Museum)

While chōnin are not as well known to non-Japanese as other social classes in Japan, they played a key role in the development of Japanese cultural products such as ukiyo-e, rakugo, and handicrafts. Aesthetic ideals such as iki, tsū, and wabi-sabi were also developed among the chōnin. This association with cultural development emerged as a way for members of the class to break the strict social barriers that prevented individuals from ascending in the social hierarchy. Members of the chōnin opted to develop culture within their communities, allowing members of such community to rise as "cultured individuals". This phenomenon is said to be behind the popularity of the iemoto system in the Edo period.

The socioeconomic ascendance of chōnin has certain similarities to the roughly contemporary rise of the "bourgeoisie" in the West. In the latter part of the Tokugawa period, this social class wielded the real power in the society although the warrior class still dominated the political sphere.

Some former military members became chōnin at the start of Tokugawa society. These military members had either lost their positions with the changing empire or resigned because of it. Many of these former military members had worked as feudal retainers gaining financial expertise, leading them to open up trading and financial institutions. According to E. S. Crawcour, "[...] these former samurai were among the leading businessmen of the seventeenth century."

On the other hand, from the mid-Edo period, wealthy chōnin and farmers could join the samurai class by giving a large sum of money to an impoverished gokenin (御家人) to be adopted into a samurai family and inherit the samurai's position and stipend. The amount of money given to a gokenin varied according to his position: 1,000 ryo for a yoriki and 500 ryo for an kachi (徒士). Some of their descendants were promoted to hatamoto (旗本) and held important positions in the shogunate. Low-ranking samurai (kachi) could change jobs and move into the lower classes, such as chōnin. For example, Takizawa Bakin became a chōnin by working for Tsutaya Jūzaburō.

== Relationship with daimyo ==
Daimyo built relationships with the chōnin requesting professional services. Chōnin acted as financial agents to monetize daimyo incomes, as well as providing loans. Chōnin who exchanged daimyo goods for cash were known as kakeya and received rice stipends along with some samurai privileges.

The need for loans arose, in part, from the implementation of the sankin-kōtai system. The requirement to travel to Edo every year caused daimyo expenditures to rise while their incomes were limited by the production of their domains. Additionally, since daimyo income was almost entirely based in rice, changes in the price of rice dramatically affected the necessity for loans.

Chōnin who began extending credit to daimyo often found it difficult to exit. This is because daimyo would promise to reactivate their old loans as a means to be granted new ones. This led many chōnin to get stuck in a cycle of lending just to keep themselves afloat. According to E. S. Crawcour, a primary reason the merchant household of Yodoya fell was because they lent out 100,000,000 ryō to daimyo and never received their loan payments.

Unfortunately for the chōnin lenders, there was no legal recourse when daimyo defaulted on their loans. In fact, there were cases where chōnin who reported these incidents ended up being punished instead.
