= Nishi-Nippori Station =

Railway and metro station in Tokyo, Japan

Coordinates: 35.731926°N 139.766800°E

JY08 JK33 NT02 Nishi-Nippori Station 西日暮里駅

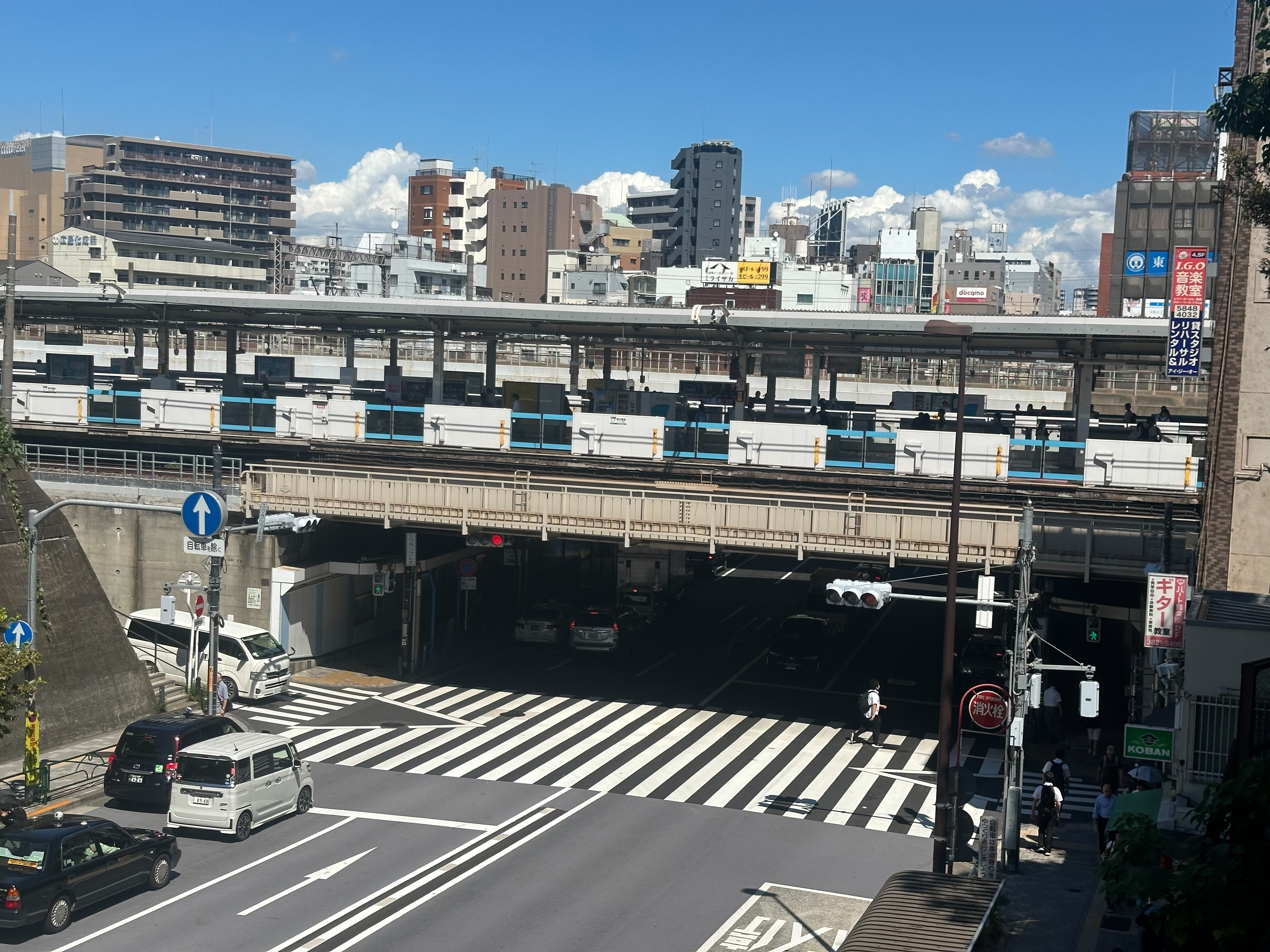
- The JR East platforms viewed from the west side in September 2024

General information
- Location: 5 Nishi-Nippori, Arakawa-ku, Tokyo; Japan
- Operator: JR East; Tokyo Metro; Toei
- Lines: Tōhoku Main Line; Chiyoda Line; Nippori–Toneri Liner
- Connections: Bus terminal

Other information
- Station code: JY08 (Yamanote Line); JK33 (Keihin-Tōhoku Line); C-16 (Chiyoda Line); NT02 (Nippori–Toneri Liner)

History
- Opened: 20 December 1969; 56 years ago

Passengers
- FY2024: 179,212 daily; 154,330 daily; 19,959 daily

Services
Preceding station	JR East	Following station
Tabata JY09 Next counter-clockwise	Yamanote Line	Nippori Next clockwise
Tabata JK34 towards Ōmiya	Keihin–Tōhoku Line Local	Nippori towards Yokohama
Preceding station	Tokyo Metro	Following station
Sendagi towards Yoyogi-Uehara	Chiyoda Line	Machiya towards Kita-Ayase
Preceding station	Toei	Following station
Akado-shōgakkōmae NT03 towards Minumadai-shinsuikōen	Nippori–Toneri Liner	Nippori NT01 Terminus
Location
- Location within Tokyo Yamanote Loop Location within Tokyo wards area Location within Japan

Nishi-Nippori Station (西日暮里駅, Nishi-Nippori-eki; lit. 'West Nippori Station') is a railway station in Arakawa, Tokyo, Japan, operated jointly by East Japan Railway Company (JR East) and the two Tokyo subway operators Tokyo Metro and Toei.

== Lines ==
Nishi-Nippori Station is served by the following lines.

- Yamanote Line
- Keihin-Tōhoku Line
- Tokyo Metro Chiyoda Line
- Nippori–Toneri Liner

== Platforms ==
=== JR East ===
The JR East station consists of two island platforms serving four tracks.

1	Keihin-Tōhoku Line	for Tokyo, Shinagawa, and Yokohama
2	Yamanote Line	for Tokyo and Shinagawa
3	Yamanote Line	for Tabata, Ikebukuro, and Shinjuku
4	Keihin-Tōhoku Line	for Tabata, Akabane, and Ōmiya

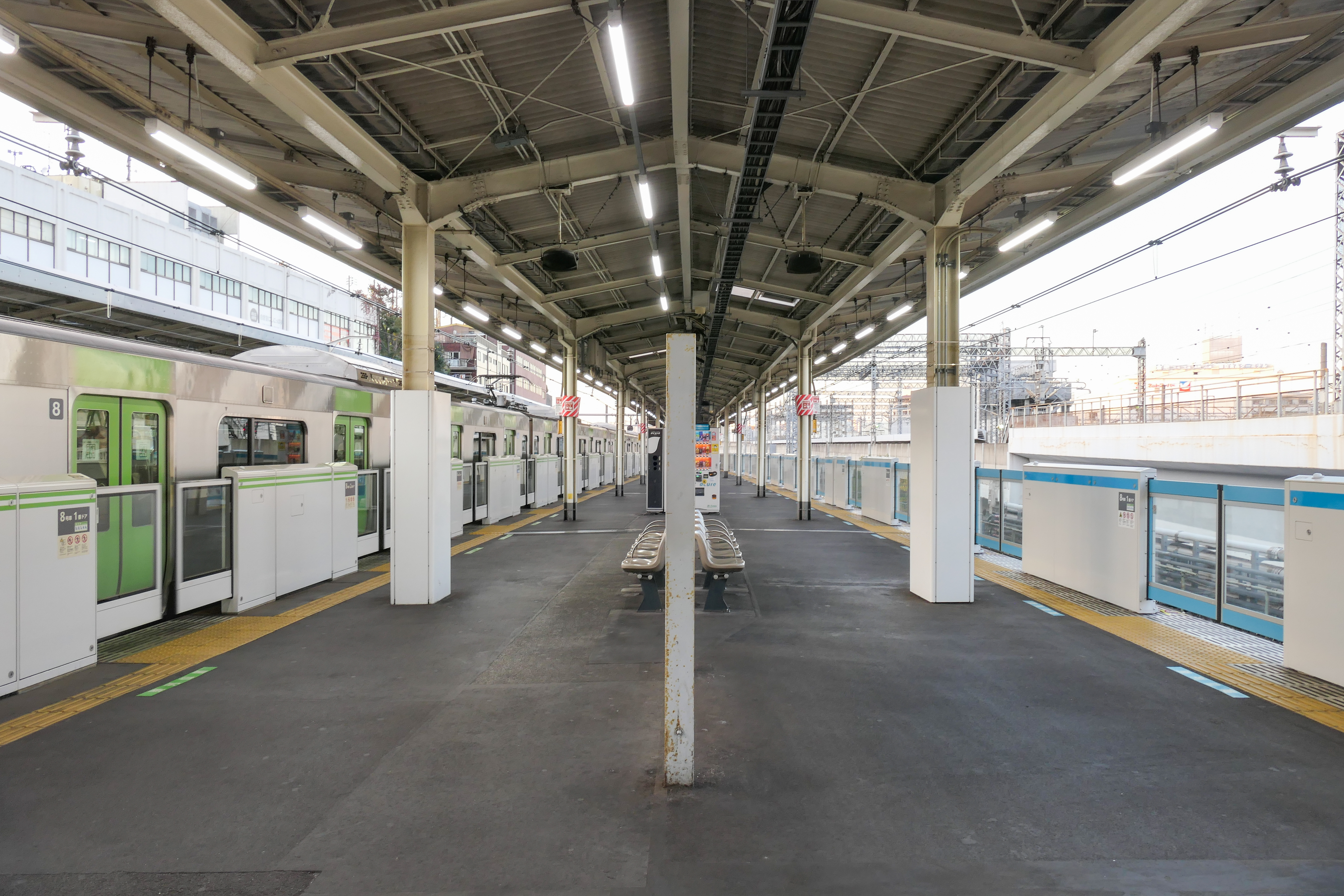
Platforms 1 and 2

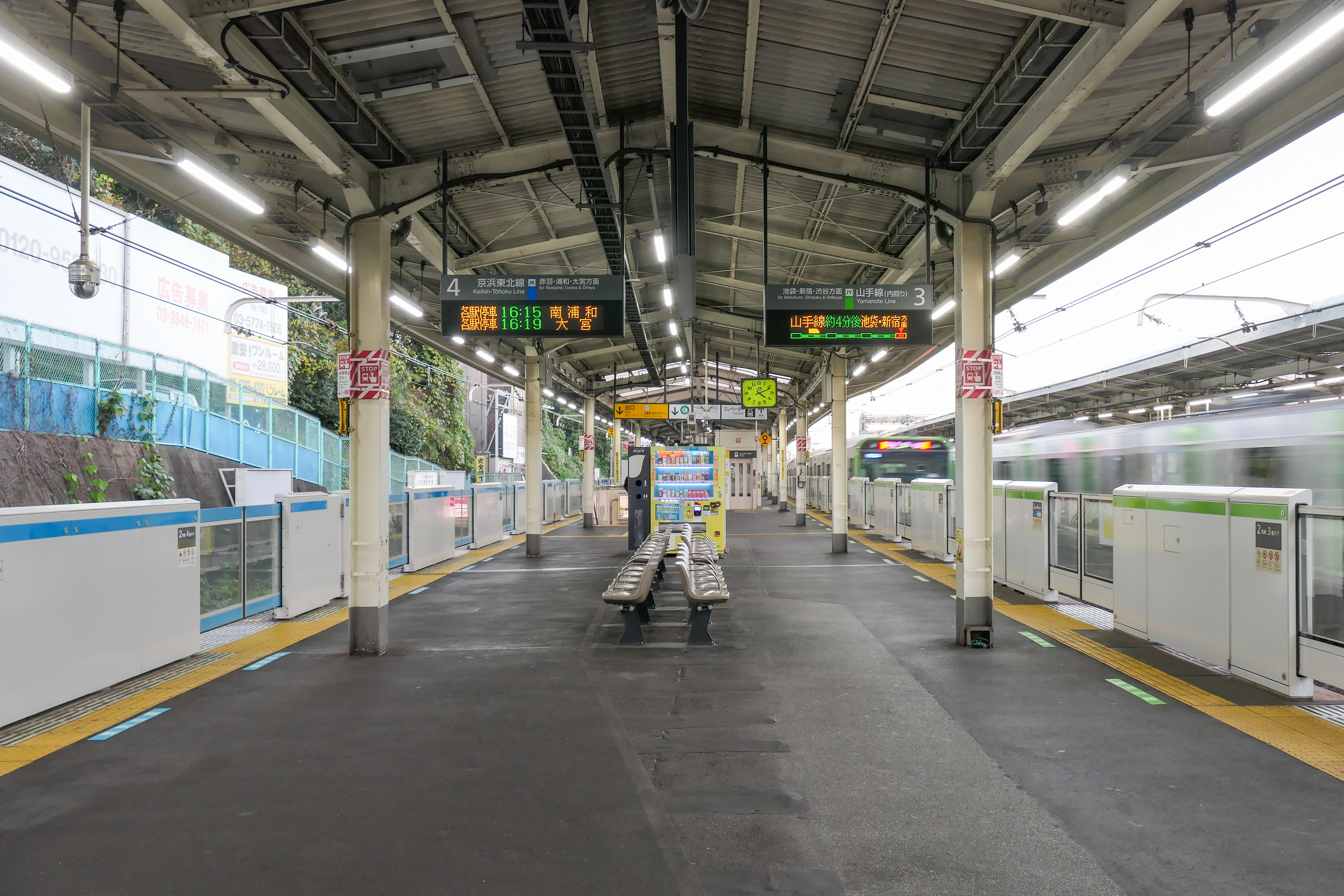
Platforms 3 and 4

=== Tokyo Metro ===
The Chiyoda Line station consists of two underground split side platforms, with platform 1 on the upper level and platform 2 on the lower level.

1	Chiyoda Line	for Otemachi and Yoyogi-uehara; Odakyu Odawara Line for Hon-Atsugi and Isehara
2	Chiyoda Line	for Kita-senju, Ayase and Kita-ayase; Joban Line (Local) for Matsudo, Kashiwa and Toride (via Ayase)

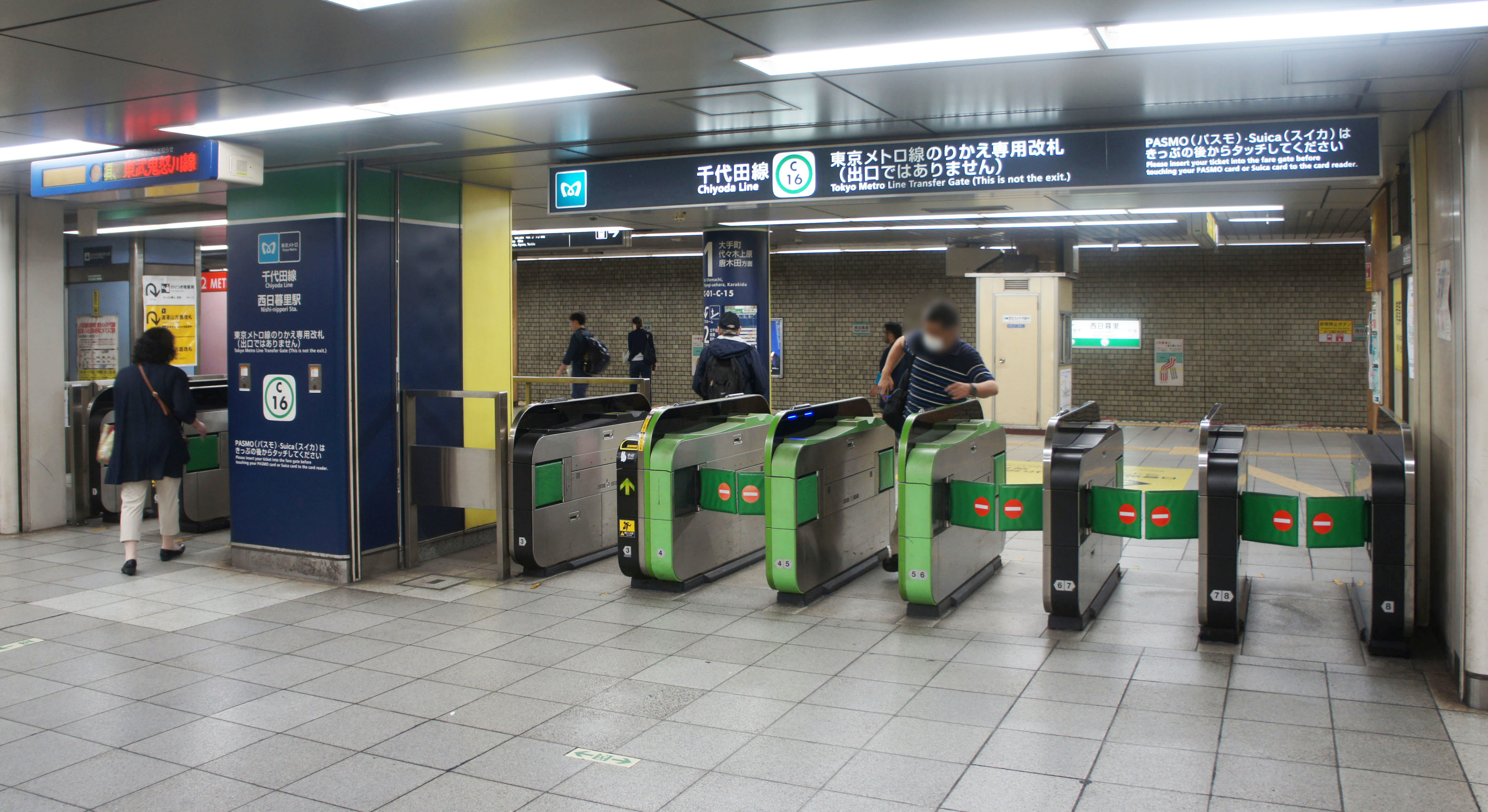
The ticket barriers for transferring between JR East and the Tokyo Metro Chiyoda Line, June 2019

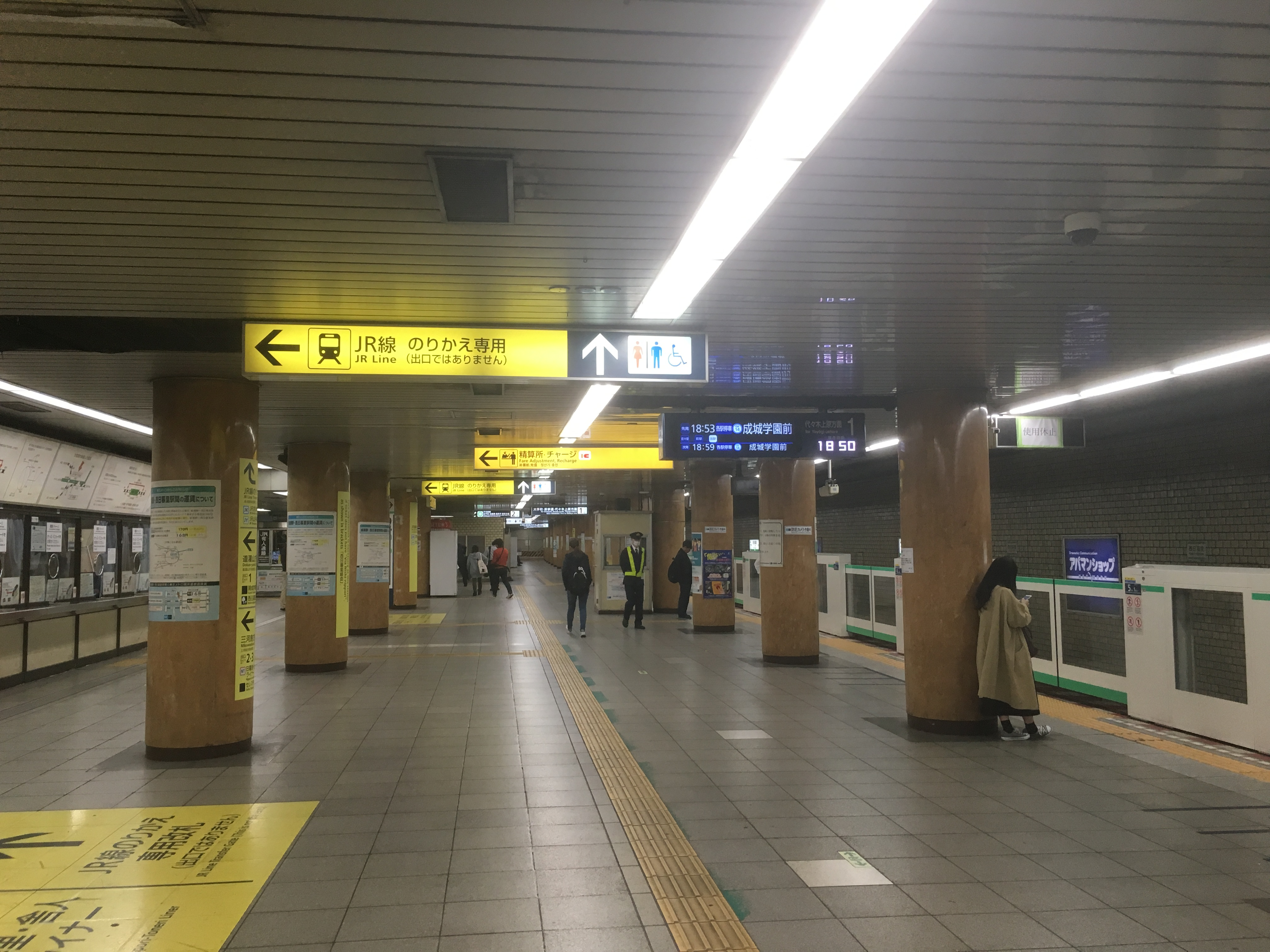
Chiyoda Line platforms, November 2019

=== Toei ===
The Nippori–Toneri Liner station is elevated and consists of a single island platform serving two tracks.

1	Nippori–Toneri Liner	for Nippori
2	Nippori–Toneri Liner	for Kumanomae, Nishiaraidaishi-nishi, and Minumadai-shinsuikoen

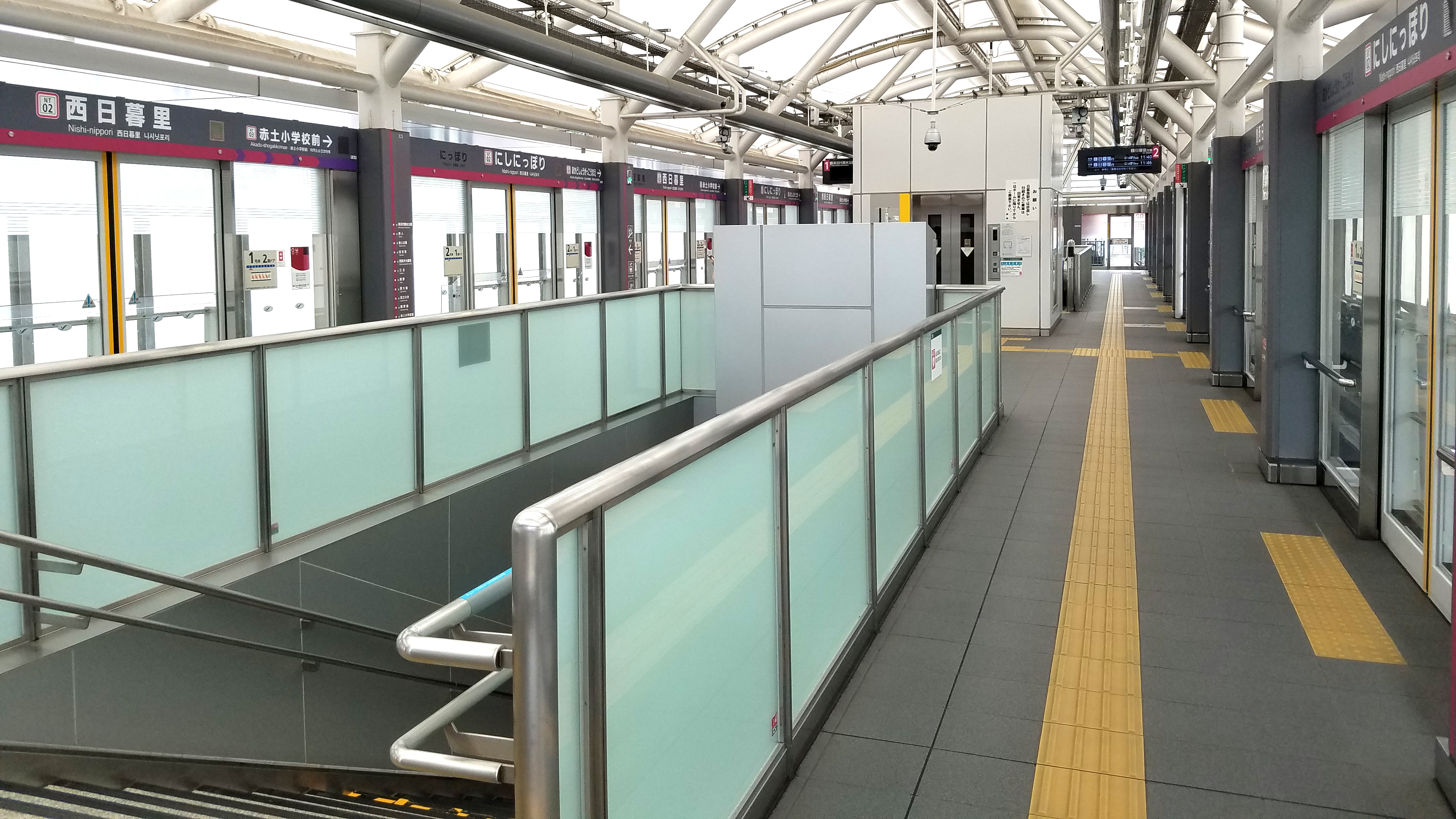
The Nippori–Toneri Liner platforms, July 2021

== History ==
The Chiyoda Line station was opened on 20 December 1969 by the Teito Rapid Transit Authority (TRTA). The Yamanote Line and Keihin–Tōhoku Line station was opened on 20 April 1971 by the Japanese National Railways (JNR). The Nippori–Toneri Liner station opened on 30 March 2008.

The station facilities of the Chiyoda Line were inherited by Tokyo Metro after the privatization of the Teito Rapid Transit Authority (TRTA) in 2004.

Station numbering was introduced in 2016 with Nishi-Nippori being assigned station numbers JY08 for the Yamanote line and JK33 for the Keihin-Tōhoku line. Numbering was expanded to the Nippori–Toneri Liner platforms in November 2017 with the station receiving station number NT02.

== Passenger statistics ==
In fiscal 2013, the JR East station was used by an average of 97,268 passengers daily (boarding passengers only), making it the 41st-busiest station operated by JR East. In fiscal 2013, the Tokyo Metro station was used by an average of 162,852 passengers per day (exiting and entering passengers), making it the fifteenth-busiest station operated by Tokyo Metro. Over the same fiscal year, the Toei station was used by an average of 10,500 per day (boarding passengers only), making it the second-busiest station on the Nippori–Toneri Liner. The daily average passenger figures for JR East and Tokyo Metro in previous years are as shown below.

Fiscal year	JR East	Tokyo Metro
2000	96,355	
2005	87,392	
2010	94,059	
2011	93,891	156,404
2012	94,884	158,555
2013	97,268	162,852

- Note that JR East figures are for boarding passengers only.

== Surrounding area ==
- Ogubashi-dōri Street
- Dōkanyama-dōri Avenue
- Kaisei Junior & Senior High School

== See also ==
- List of railway stations in Japan
