= Ōgi-ōhashi Station =

Railway station in Tokyo, Japan

Coordinates: 35.7639°N 139.7708°E

NT06 Ōgi-ōhashi Station 扇大橋駅
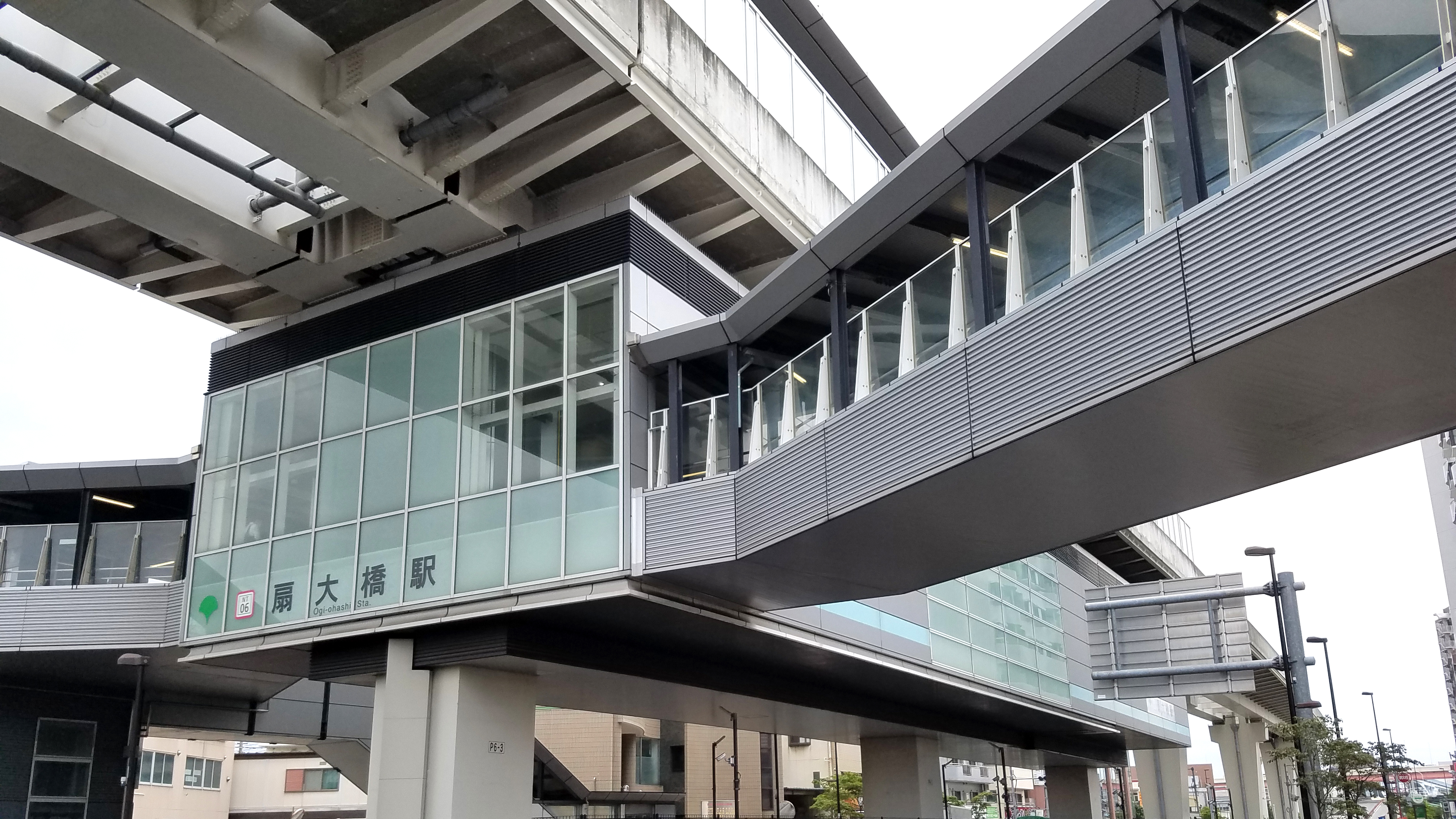
- The station building in July 2021

General information
- Location: 25-17 Ōgi 2chōme, Adachi, Tokyo （足立区扇2丁目25-17） Japan
- Operator: Toei
- Line: Nippori–Toneri Liner
- Platforms: 1 island platform
- Tracks: 2

Construction
- Structure type: Elevated

Other information
- Station code: 06

History
- Opened: 30 March 2008; 18 years ago

Services
Preceding station	Toei	Following station
Kōya NT07 towards Minumadai-shinsuikōen	Nippori–Toneri Liner	Adachi-odai NT05 towards Nippori
Location
- Location within Special wards of Tokyo Location within Tokyo Bay and Bōsō Peninsula Location within Tokyo Location within Japan

Ōgi-ōhashi Station (扇大橋駅, Ōgi-ōhashi-eki) is a railway station located in Adachi-ku, Tokyo, Japan. The station is the sixth station on the Nippori-Toneri Liner line, and is 4.1 km from the Nippori station terminus.

== Lines ==
- Tokyo Metropolitan Bureau of Transportation
  - Nippori-Toneri Liner

== Station Layout ==
This elevated station consists of a single island platform serving two tracks. Platform 1 serves trains heading in the Minumadaishin Water Park direction, while Platform 2 serves trains heading in the Nippori direction.

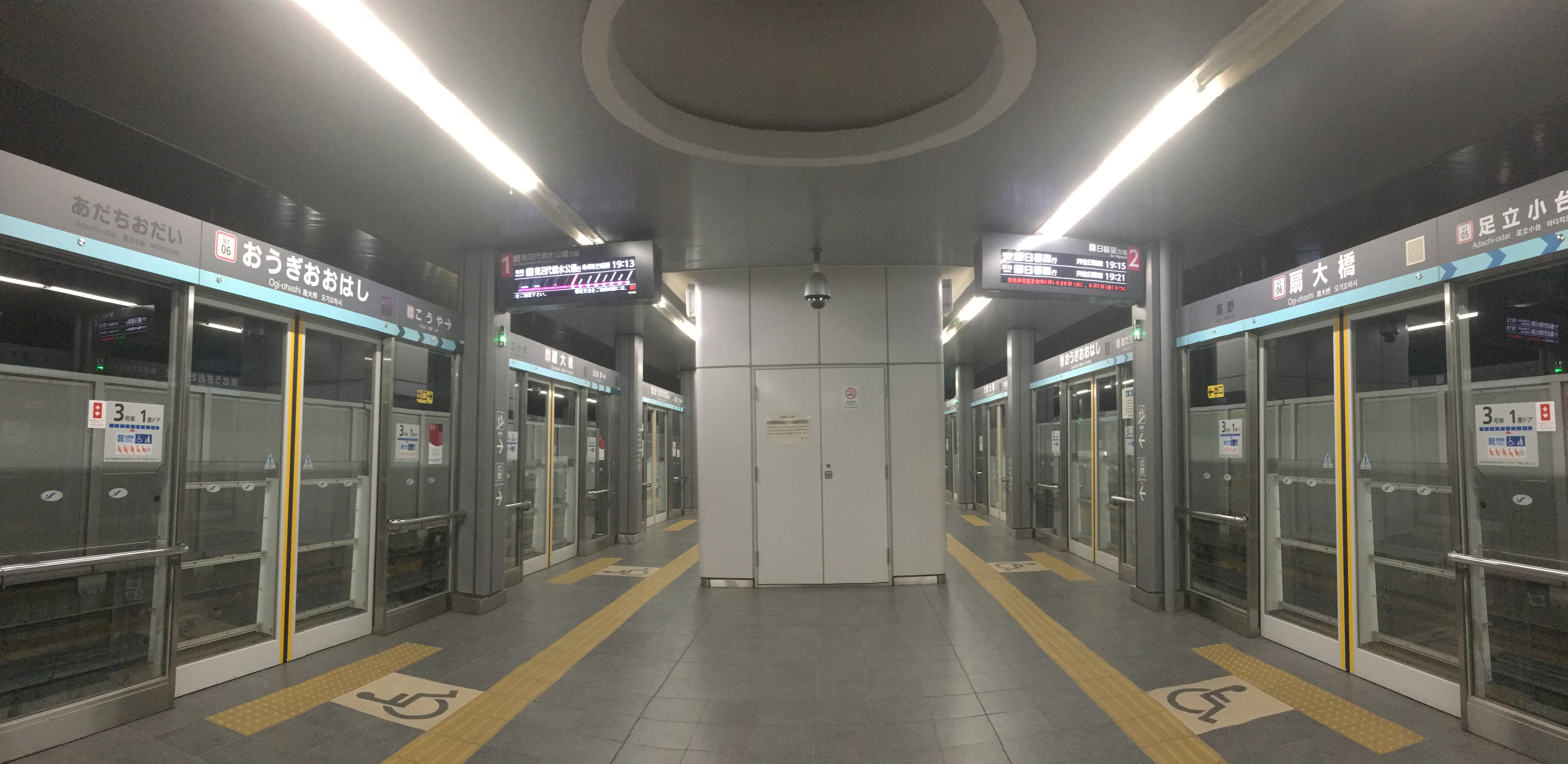
Platforms

== History ==
The station opened on 30 March 2008, when the Nippori-Toneri Liner began operation.

There was a public consultation and voting process to choose the name of the station. The name which received the most public votes was “Ogi-Ohashi Kita Station” (North Ogi-Ohashi Station) but after further consultation it was decided to remove Kita from the name, as there is no corresponding South Ogi-Ohashi station.

Station numbering was introduced in November 2017 with the station receiving station number NT06.
