= Yazaike Station =

Railway station in Tokyo, Japan

Coordinates: 35.7885°N 139.7703°E

NT10 Yazaike Station 谷在家駅
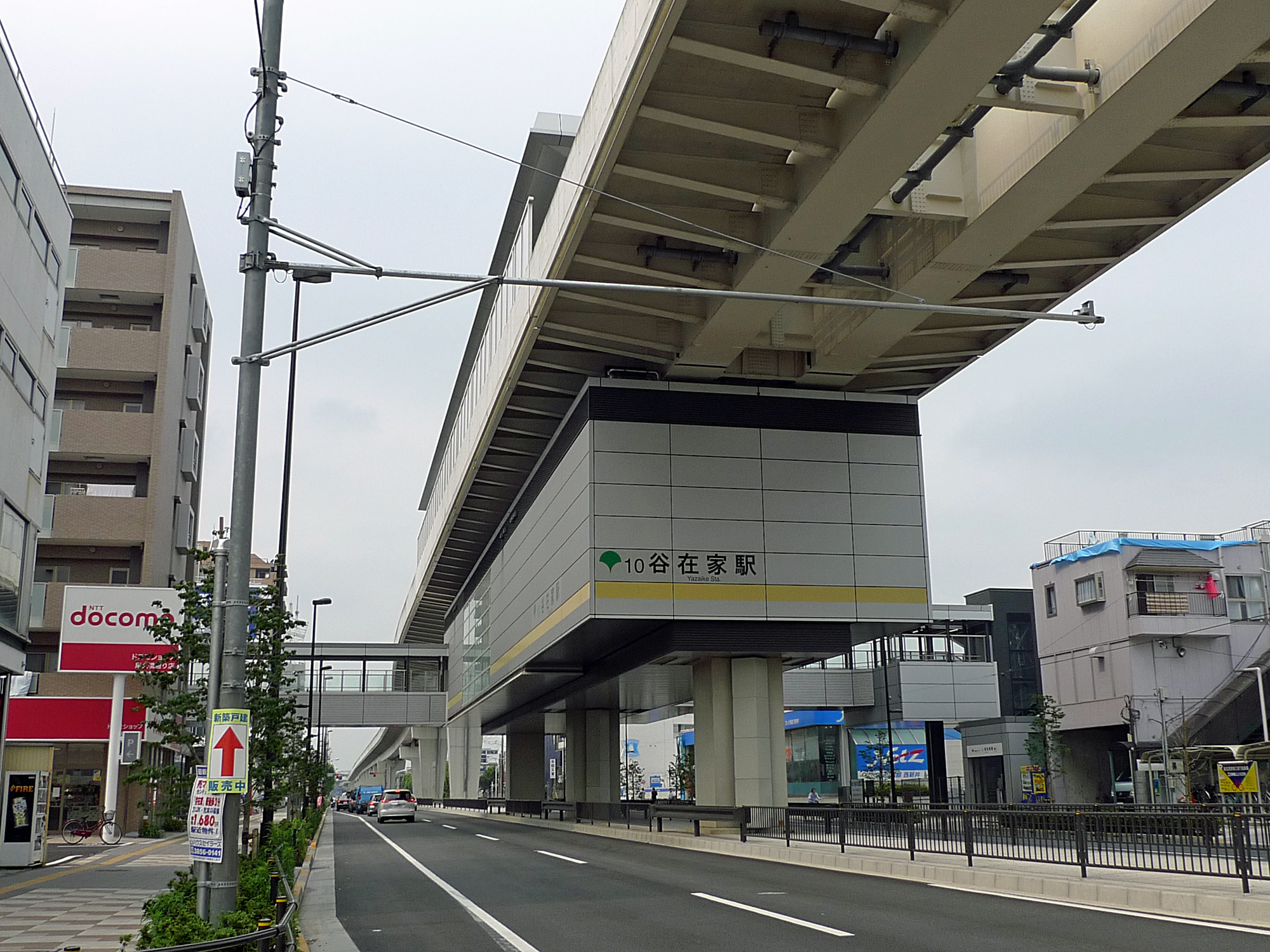

General information
- Location: 20-23 Yazaike 3-chōme, Adachi, Tokyo （足立区谷在家3丁目20-23） Japan
- Operator: Toei
- Line: Nippori–Toneri Liner
- Platforms: 1 island platform
- Tracks: 2

Construction
- Structure type: Elevated

Other information
- Station code: 10

History
- Opened: 30 March 2008; 18 years ago

Services
Preceding station	Toei	Following station
Toneri-kōen NT11 towards Minumadai-shinsuikōen	Nippori–Toneri Liner	Nishiaraidaishi-nishi NT09 towards Nippori
Location
- Location within Special wards of Tokyo Location within Tokyo Bay and Bōsō Peninsula Location within Tokyo Location within Japan

Yazaike Station (谷在家駅, Yazaike-eki) is a train station located in Adachi, Tokyo, Japan.

== Lines ==
- Tokyo Metropolitan Bureau of Transportation
  - Nippori-Toneri Line

== Platforms ==
This elevated station consists of a single island platform serving two tracks.

1	■ Nippori-Toneri Liner	for Minumadai-shinsuikōen
2	■ Nippori-Toneri Liner	for Nippori

== History ==
The station opened on 30 March 2008, when the Nippori-Toneri Liner began operation.

Station numbering was introduced in November 2017 with the station receiving station number NT10.
