= Akado-shōgakkōmae Station =

Railway station in Tokyo, Japan

NT03 Akado-shōgakkōmae Station 赤土小学校前駅
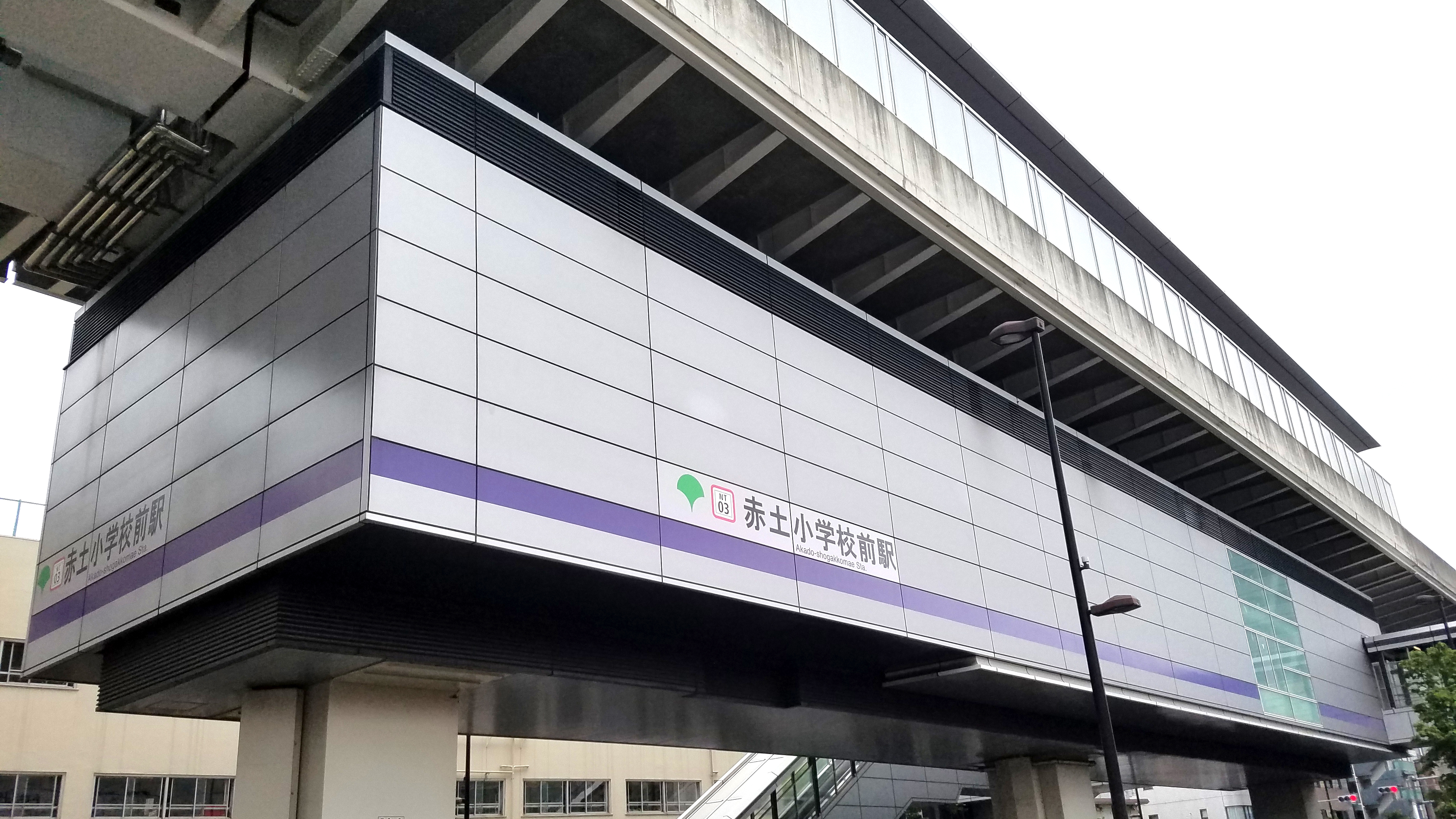
- The station building in July 2021

General information
- Location: 4-7-7 Higashiogu, Arakawa, Tokyo （荒川区東尾久4-7-7） Japan
- Coordinates: 35°44′34.43″N 139°46′8.5″E
- Operator: Toei
- Line: Nippori–Toneri Liner
- Platforms: 1 island platform
- Tracks: 2

Construction
- Structure type: Elevated

Other information
- Station code: 03

History
- Opened: 30 March 2008; 18 years ago

Services
Preceding station	Toei	Following station
Kumanomae NT04 towards Minumadai-shinsuikōen	Nippori–Toneri Liner	Nishi-Nippori NT02 towards Nippori
Location
- Location within Special wards of Tokyo Location within Tokyo Bay and Bōsō Peninsula Location within Tokyo Location within Japan

Akado-shōgakkōmae Station (赤土小学校前駅, Akado-shōgakkōmae-eki; lit. "station in front of Akado elementary school") is a train station in Arakawa, Tokyo, Japan.

== Lines ==
The station is served by the Nippori-Toneri Liner rubber-tyred automated guideway transit (AGT) system operated by Tokyo Metropolitan Bureau of Transportation (Toei).

== Station layout ==
This elevated station consists of a single island platform serving two tracks.

== History ==
The station opened on 30 March 2008, when the Nippori-Toneri Liner began operating.

Station numbering was introduced to the Nippori-Toneri Liner platforms in November 2017, with the station receiving station number NT03.
