= Adachi-Odai Station =

Railway station in Tokyo, Japan

NT05 Adachi-Odai Station 足立小台駅
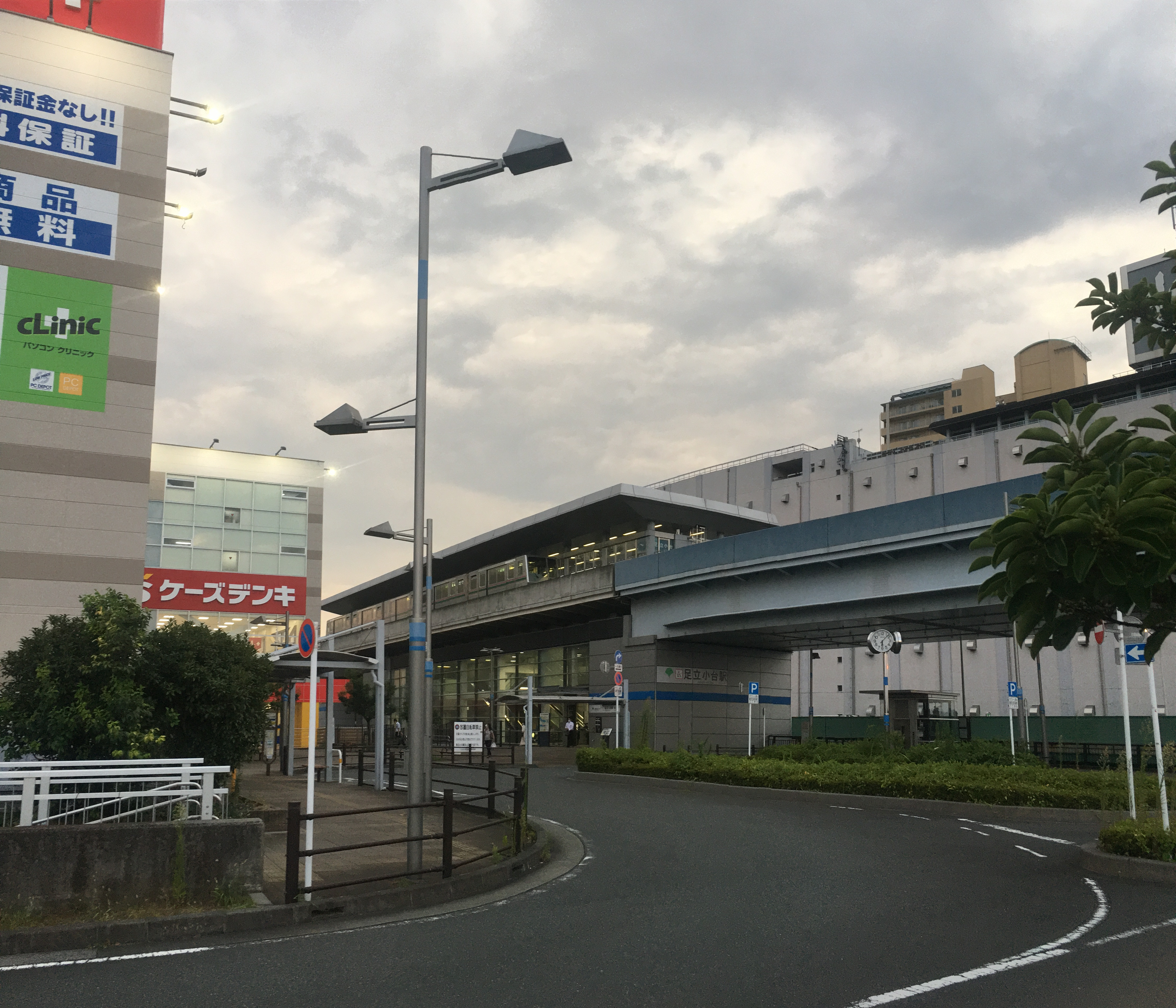

General information
- Location: Odai 1-chōme, Adachi, Tokyo （足立区小台1丁目） Japan
- Coordinates: 35°45′17″N 139°46′13″E
- Operator: Toei
- Line: Nippori–Toneri Liner
- Platforms: 1 island platform
- Tracks: 2

Construction
- Structure type: Elevated

Other information
- Station code: 05

History
- Opened: 30 March 2008; 18 years ago

Services
Preceding station	Toei	Following station
Ōgi-ōhashi NT06 towards Minumadai-shinsuikōen	Nippori–Toneri Liner	Kumanomae NT04 towards Nippori
Location
- Location within Special wards of Tokyo Location within Tokyo Bay and Bōsō Peninsula Location within Tokyo Location within Japan

Adachi-Odai Station (足立小台駅, Adachi-Odai-eki) is a passenger railway station located in Adachi, Tokyo, Japan, operated by the Tokyo Metropolitan Bureau of Transportation.

== Lines ==
Adachi-Odai Station is served only by the Nippori-Toneri Liner. It is located 2.95 km (1.83 mi) from Nippori Station and 6.65 km (4.13 mi) from Minumadai-shinsuikōen Station.

== Station Layout ==
This elevated station consists of a single island platform serving two tracks.

== History ==
The station opened on 30 March 2008, when the Nippori-Toneri Liner began operation.

Station numbering was introduced in November 2017, with the station receiving station number NT05.

== Passenger Statistics ==
Adachi-Odai Station is by far the least used station on the Nippori Toneri Liner, recording 674,000 boarding passengers in 2024. The station suffered a sudden drop in passengers in 2020, however numbers have been steadily climbing since. A summary table of yearly passenger numbers can be seen below.

Fiscal year	Total boarding passengers	Total deboarding passengers
2024	674,000	671,000
2023	660,000	656,000
2022	629,000	621,000
2021	598,000	587,000
2020	584,000	571,000
2019	712,000	706,000
2018	721,000	706,000
