= Toneri Station =

Railway station in Tokyo, Japan

Coordinates: 35.8057°N 139.7701°E

NT12 Toneri Station 舎人駅
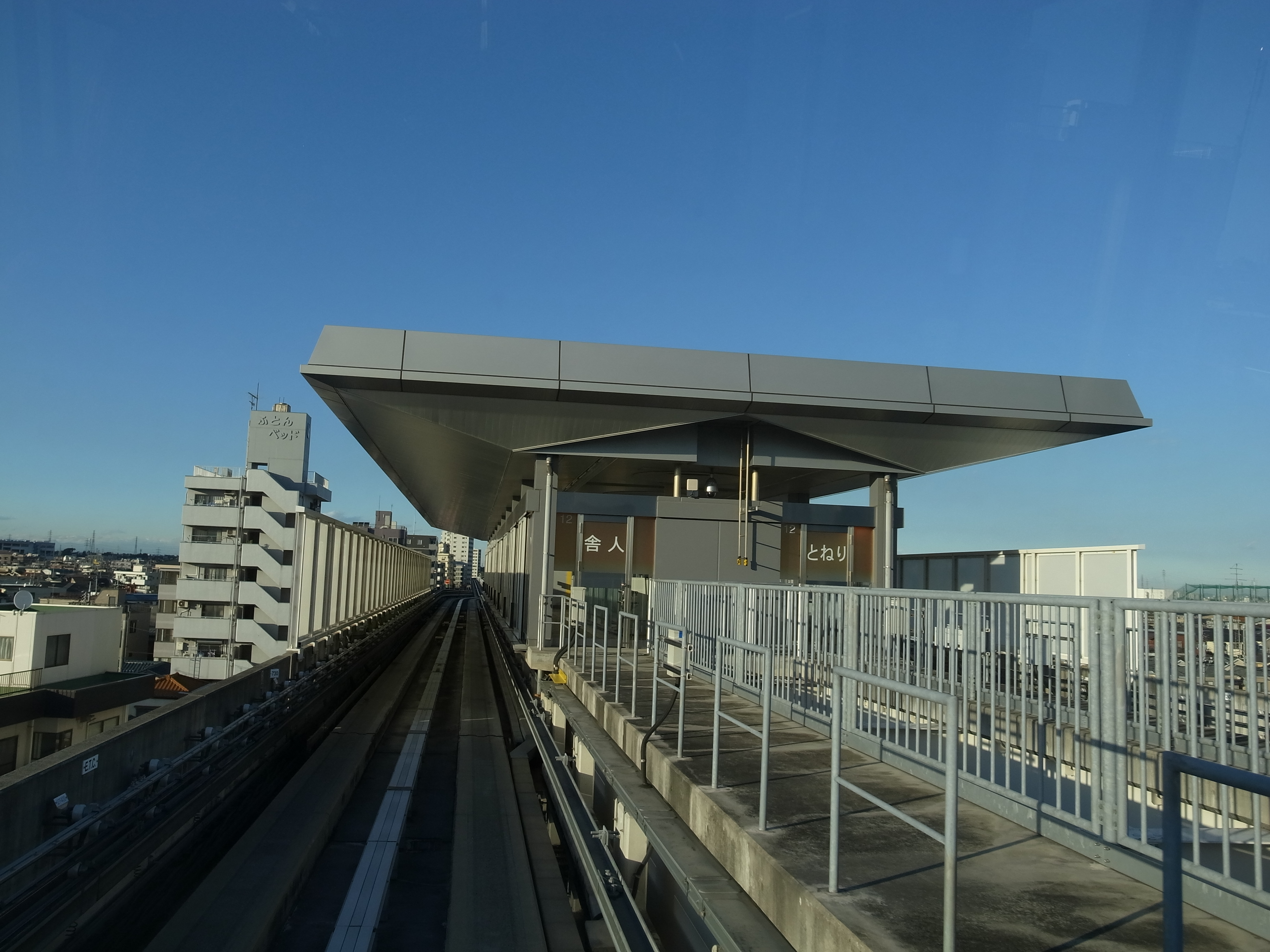
- Station and tracks, 2014

General information
- Location: 16-15 Toneri 1-chōme, Adachi, Tokyo （足立区舎人1丁目16-15） Japan
- Operator: Toei
- Line: Nippori–Toneri Liner
- Platforms: 1 island platform
- Tracks: 2

Construction
- Structure type: Elevated

Other information
- Station code: 12

History
- Opened: 30 March 2008; 18 years ago

Services
Preceding station	Toei	Following station
Minumadai-shinsuikōen NT13 Terminus	Nippori–Toneri Liner	Toneri-kōen NT11 towards Nippori
Location
- Location within Special wards of Tokyo Location within Tokyo Location within Japan

Toneri Station (舎人駅, Toneri-eki) is a train station located in Adachi, Tokyo, Japan. It is 8.7 km from Nippori Station.

== Lines ==
- Tokyo Metropolitan Bureau of Transportation
  - Nippori-Toneri Liner

== Platforms ==
This elevated station consists of a single island platform serving two tracks.

1	■ Nippori-Toneri Liner	for Minumadai-shinsuikōen
2	■ Nippori-Toneri Liner	for Nippori

== History ==
The station opened on 30 March 2008, when the Nippori-Toneri Liner began operation.

Station numbering was introduced in November 2017 with the station receiving station number NT12.
