= Kōya Station (Tokyo) =

Railway station in Tokyo, Japan

Coordinates: 35.7684°N 139.7707°E

NT07 Kōya Station 高野駅
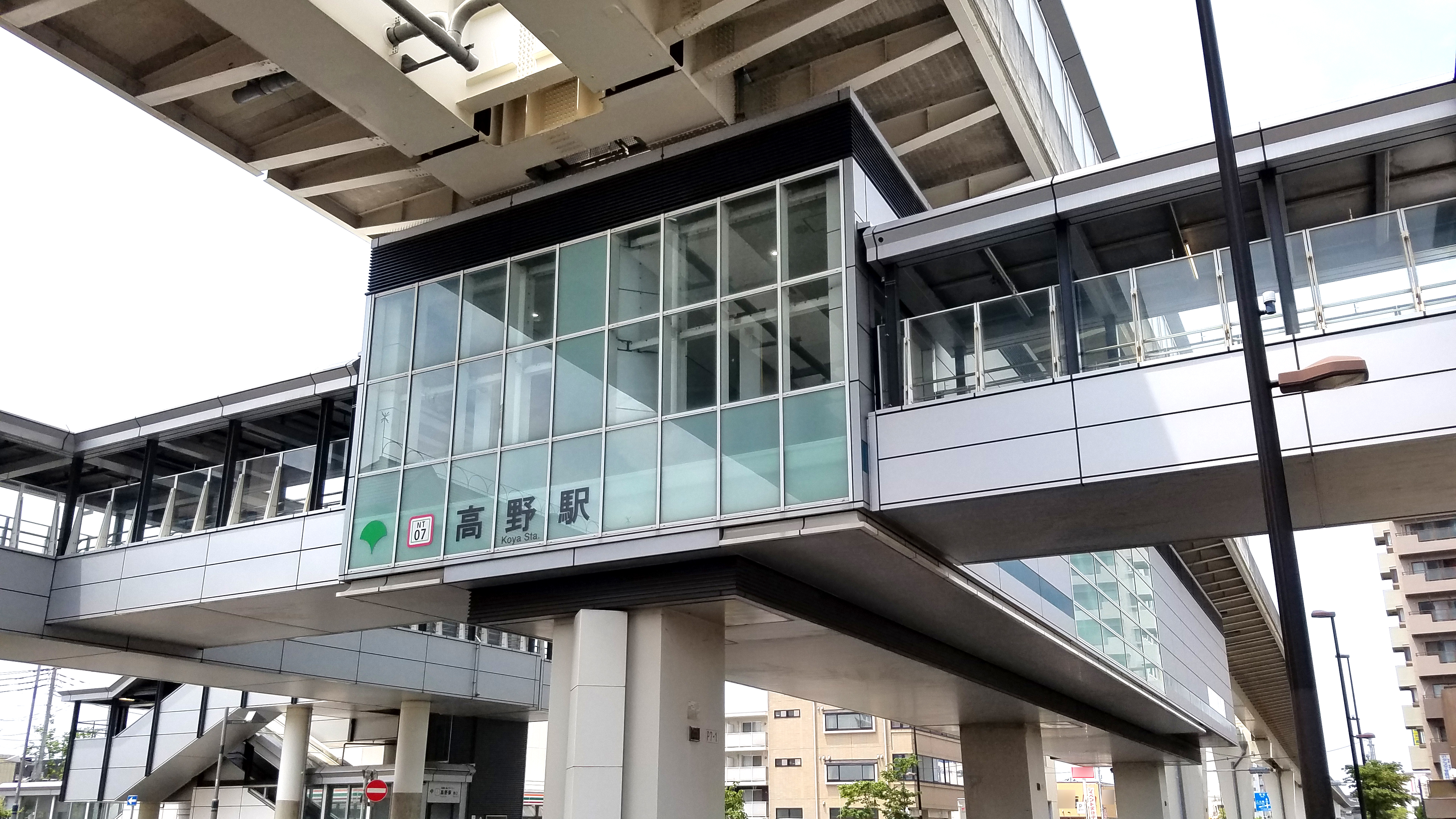
- The station building in July 2021

General information
- Location: 2-45-1 Ogi, Adachi Ward, Tokyo; Japan
- Operator: Toei
- Line: Nippori–Toneri Liner
- Platforms: 1 island platform
- Tracks: 2

Construction
- Structure type: Elevated

Other information
- Station code: 07

History
- Opened: 30 March 2008; 18 years ago

Services
Preceding station	Toei	Following station
Kōhoku NT08 towards Minumadai-shinsuikōen	Nippori–Toneri Liner	Ōgi-ōhashi NT06 towards Nippori
Location
- Location within Special wards of Tokyo Location within Tokyo Bay and Bōsō Peninsula Location within Tokyo Location within Japan

Kōya Station (高野駅, Kōya-eki) is a railway station located in Adachi, Tokyo, Japan. It is 4.6 km (2.9 mi) from Nippori Station.

== Lines ==
- Tokyo Metropolitan Bureau of Transportation
  - Nippori-Toneri Liner

== Station Layout ==
This elevated station consists of a single island platform serving two tracks.

== History ==
The station opened on 30 March 2008, when the Nippori-Toneri Liner began operation.

Station numbering was introduced in November 2017 with the station receiving station number NT07.
