= Kōhoku Station (Tokyo) =

Railway station in Tokyo, Japan

Coordinates: 35.7739°N 139.7703°E

NT08 Kōhoku Station 江北駅
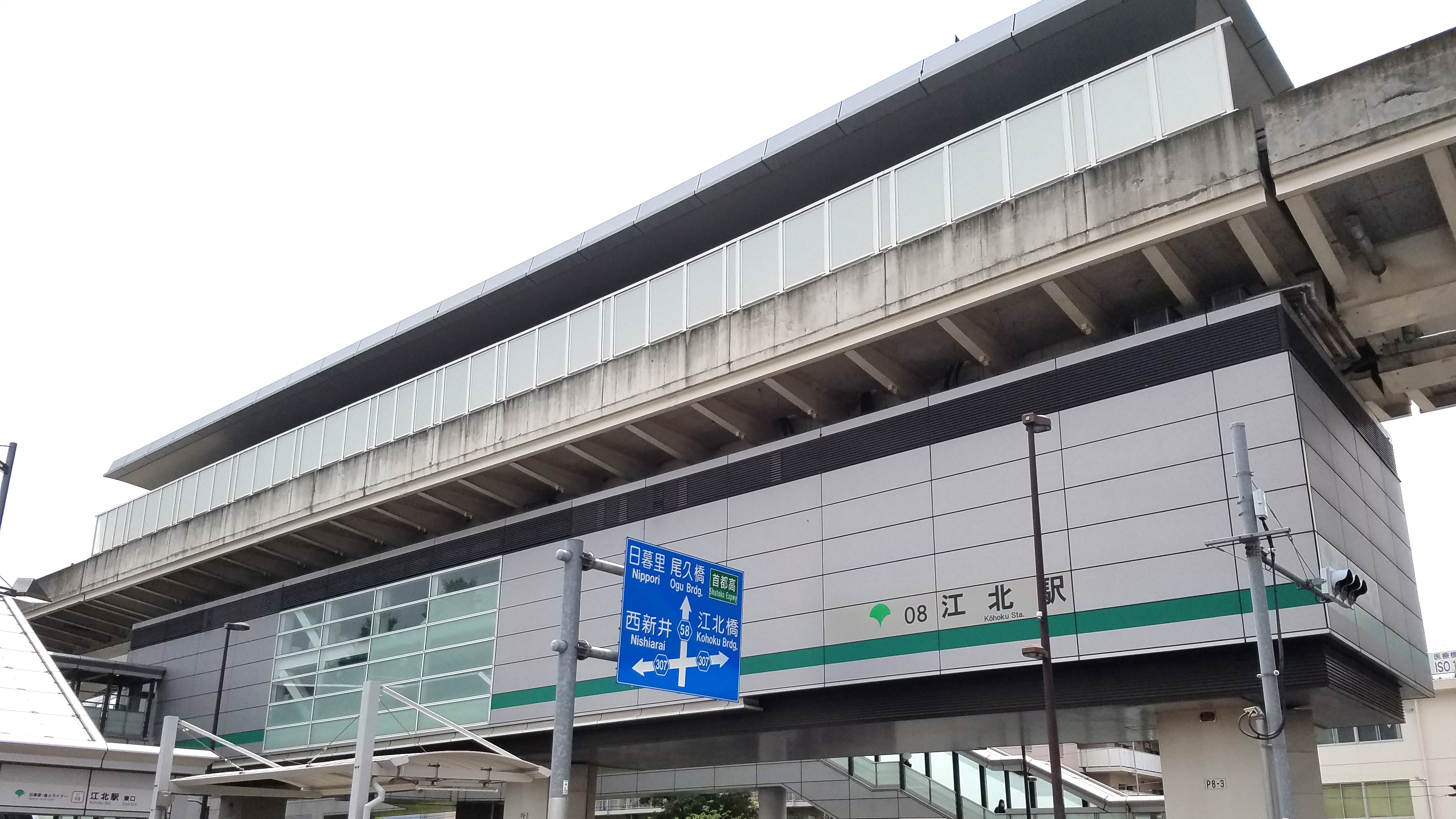
- The station building in July 2021

General information
- Location: 30-27 Kōhoku 4-chōme, Adachi, Tokyo （足立区江北4丁目30-27） Japan
- Operator: Toei
- Line: Nippori–Toneri Liner
- Platforms: 1 island platform
- Tracks: 2

Construction
- Structure type: Elevated

Other information
- Station code: 08

History
- Opened: 30 March 2008; 18 years ago

Services
Preceding station	Toei	Following station
Nishiaraidaishi-nishi NT09 towards Minumadai-shinsuikōen	Nippori–Toneri Liner	Kōya NT07 towards Nippori
Location
- Location within Special wards of Tokyo Location within Tokyo Bay and Bōsō Peninsula Location within Tokyo Location within Japan

Kōhoku Station (江北駅, Kōhoku-eki) is a train station located in Adachi, Tokyo, Japan.

== Lines ==
- Tokyo Metropolitan Bureau of Transportation
  - Nippori-Toneri Line

== Platforms ==
This elevated station consists of a single island platform serving two tracks.

1	■ Nippori-Toneri Liner	for Minumadai-shinsuikōen
2	■ Nippori-Toneri Liner	for Nippori

== History ==
The station opened on 30 March 2008, when the Nippori-Toneri Liner began operation.

Station numbering was introduced in November 2017 with the station receiving station number NT08.
