= Nishiaraidaishi-nishi Station =

Railway station in Tokyo, Japan

Coordinates: 35.7813°N 139.7701°E

NT09 Nishiaraidaishi-nishi Station 西新井大師西駅
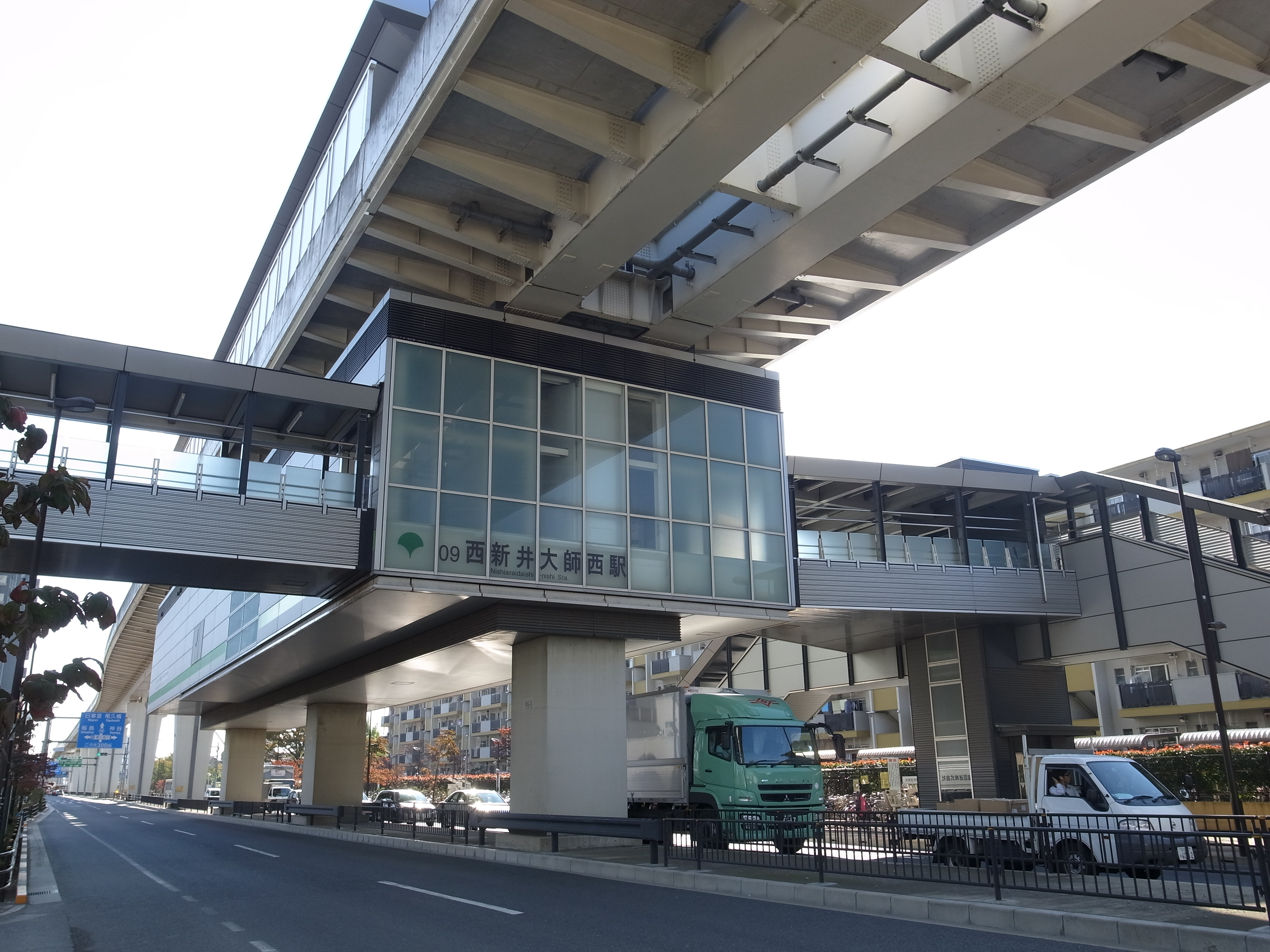
- Station building, 2014

General information
- Location: 6-30-23 Kōhoku, Adachi, Tokyo （足立区江北6丁目30-23） Japan
- Operator: Toei
- Line: Nippori–Toneri Liner
- Platforms: 1 island platform
- Tracks: 2

Construction
- Structure type: Elevated

Other information
- Station code: 09

History
- Opened: 30 March 2008; 18 years ago

Services
Preceding station	Toei	Following station
Yazaike NT10 towards Minumadai-shinsuikōen	Nippori–Toneri Liner	Kōhoku NT08 towards Nippori
Location
- Location within Special wards of Tokyo Location within Tokyo Bay and Bōsō Peninsula Location within Tokyo Location within Japan

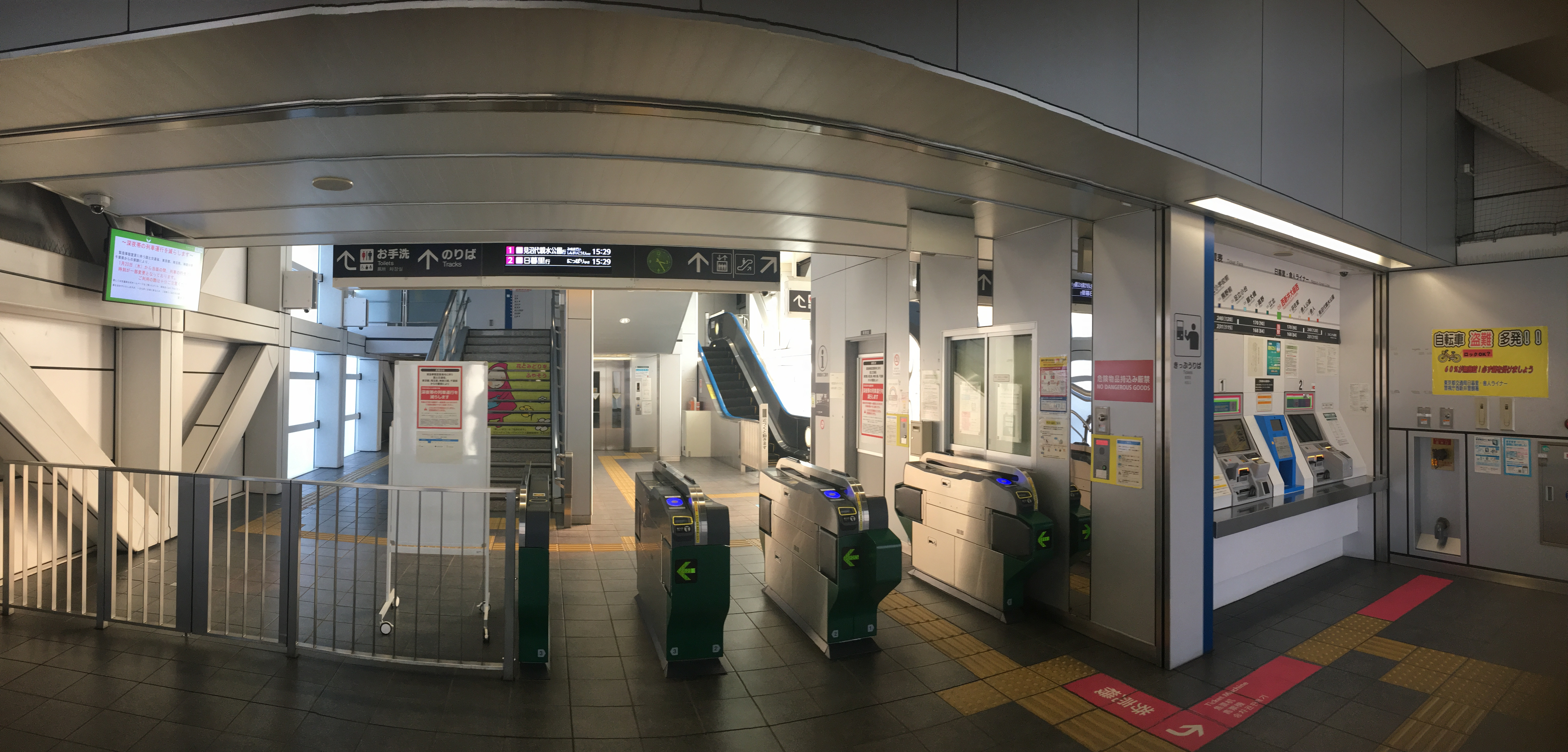
Ticket gates, 2021

Nishiaraidaishi-nishi Station (西新井大師西駅, Nishiaraidaishi-nishi-eki) is a train station in Adachi, Tokyo, Japan.

== Lines ==
- Tokyo Metropolitan Bureau of Transportation
  - Nippori-Toneri Liner

== Platforms ==
This elevated station consists of a single island platform serving two tracks.

1	■ Nippori-Toneri Liner	for Minumadai-shinsuikōen
2	■ Nippori-Toneri Liner	for Nippori

== History ==
The station opened on 30 March 2008, when the Nippori-Toneri Liner began operation.

Station numbering was introduced in November 2017 with the station receiving station number NT09.
