= Kōya Station =

Kōya Station may refer to:

- Kōya Station (Chiba) (幸谷駅), a train station in Chiba Prefecture, Japan
- Kōya Station (Tokyo) (高野駅), a train station in Tokyo, Japan
