= Kōhoku Station =

Kōhoku Station may refer to:

- Kōhoku Station (Aichi) in Nagoya, Japan
- Kōhoku Station (Saga) in Saga, Japan
- Kōhoku Station (Tokyo) in Tokyo, Japan
