= Adachi, Tokyo =

Ward in the Tokyo Metropolis, Japan

Adachi 足立区
- Special ward
- Adachi City
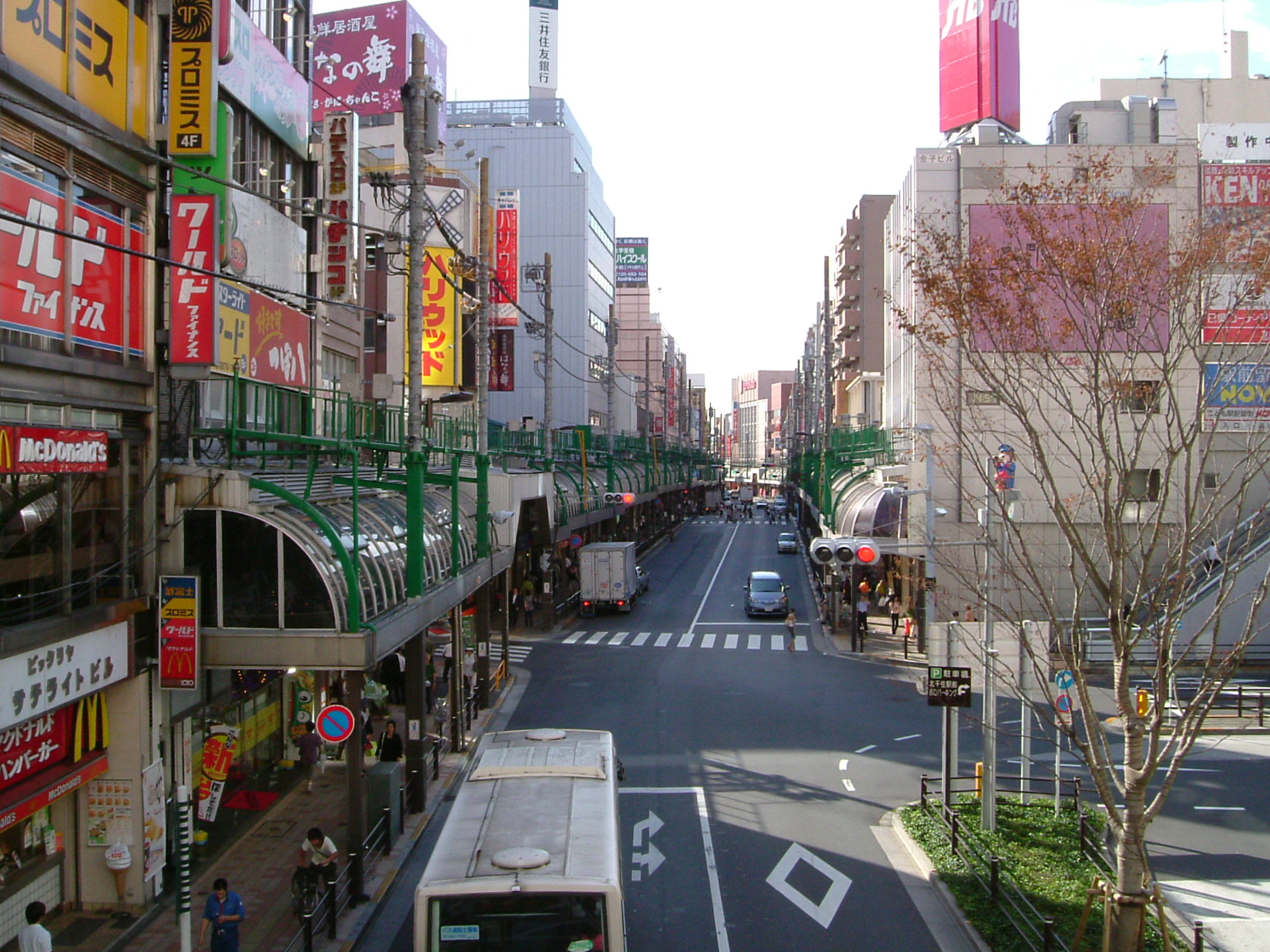
- A street in front of Kita-Senju Station in Adachi

- Flag Emblem

- Location of Adachi in Tokyo Metropolis

- Location in Japan
- Coordinates: 35°47′N 139°48′E
- Country: Japan
- Region: Kantō
- Prefecture: Tokyo Metropolis
- First official recorded: 826 AD
- As merged with Tokyo City: October 1, 1932
- As special ward became to Tokyo: July 1, 1943

Government
  - Mayor: Yayoi Kondo (since June 2007)

Area
  - Total: 53.25 km^{2} (20.56 sq mi)

Population (October 1, 2020)
  - Total: 695,043
  - Density: 13,052/km^{2} (33,800/sq mi)
- Time zone: UTC+09:00 (JST)
- City hall address: Chūōhonchō 1-17-1, Adachi-ku, Tokyo; 120-8510
- Website: www.city.adachi.tokyo.jp
- Symbols
- Flower: Tulip
- Tree: Cherry Blossom

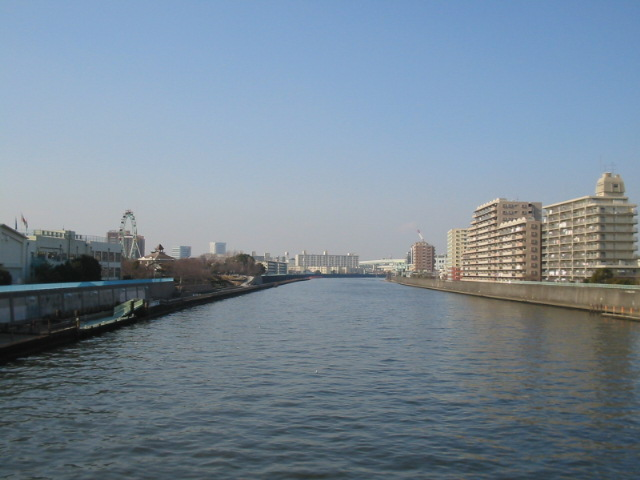
The Sumida River makes up the southern border of Adachi (right) and the northern border of Arakawa (left).

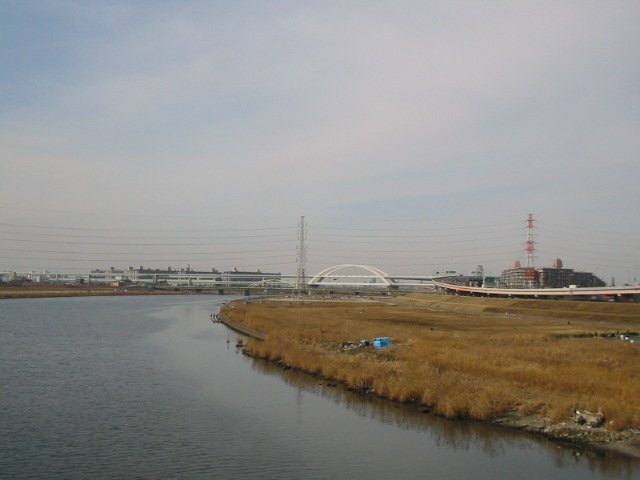
The Arakawa River

Adachi (足立区, Adachi-ku; Japanese pronunciation: [ä̀.dä́.c̟͡ɕí, -c̟͡ɕi̥.kɯ̈̀]) is a special ward in the Tokyo Metropolis in Japan. It is located to the north of the heart of Tokyo. The ward consists of two separate areas: a small strip of land between the Sumida River and Arakawa River and a larger area north of the Arakawa River. The ward is bordered by the cities of Kawaguchi, Sōka and Yashio in Saitama and Katsushika, Sumida, Arakawa and Kita in Tokyo. The ward is called Adachi City in English.

As of May 1, 2015, the ward has an estimated population of 692,707 and a population density of 13,010 persons per km^{2}. The total area is 53.25 km^{2}.

The Adachi Land Transportation Office is located here, and automobiles registered at this office bear Adachi number plates.

== History ==
Under the Ritsuryō system, the present-day ward was the southern extremity of Adachi District, Musashi Province. In 826, during the Heian period, the Nishiarai Daishi temple was founded. During the Muromachi period and into the Sengoku period, the Chiba clan held control of the region. The Great Senju Bridge was built in 1594. In the Edo period, parts were under the direct control of the Tokugawa shogunate, and parts were under the administration of Kan'ei-ji, a temple in present-day Ueno, Tokyo. Adachi was also home to Senju-shuku was a post station on both the Nikkō Kaidō and the Mito Kaidō. The shogunate maintained the Kozukappara execution grounds in Senju.

In 1932, Adachi, formerly known as Minamiadachi District, became a ward of Tokyo City.

== Demographics ==
Historical population
Year	Pop.	±%
1920	60,780	—
1930	127,507	+109.8%
1940	231,246	+81.4%
1945	172,437	−25.4%
1950	268,304	+55.6%
1960	408,768	+52.4%
1970	571,791	+39.9%
1980	619,961	+8.4%
1990	631,163	+1.8%
2000	617,123	−2.2%
2010	683,426	+10.7%
2020	695,043	+1.7%
Source: Censuses (Note: For years prior to 1930, figures cover the area of present-day Adachi-ku.)

== Districts and neighborhoods ==
Ayase Area

- Adachi
- Aoi
- Ayase
- Kōdō
- Nishi Ayase

Fuchie Area

- Higashi Hokima
- Higashi Rokugatsu-chō
- Hodzuka-chō
- Hokima
- Nishi Hokima
- Rokuchō
- Rokugatsu
- Takenotsuka

Hanahata Area

- Hanahata
- Kahei
- Kitakaheichō
- Minami Hanabatake
- Mutsuki
- Nishi Kahei
- Shinmei
- Shinmei Minami
- Tatsunuma
- Yanaka

Higashi Fuchie Area

- Higashi Ayase
- Nakagawa
- Ōyata
- Sano
- Tōwa

Ikō Area

- Higashi Ikō
- Ikō
- Ikōhon-chō
- Nishi Ikō
- Nishi Ikōchō
- Nishi Takenotsuka

Kōhoku Area

- Horinouchi
- Kaga
- Kōhoku
- Miyagi
- Nitta
- Odai
- Saranuma
- Shikahama
- Tsubaki
- Yazaike

Nishi Arai Area

- Motoki
- Motoki Higashi-machi
- Motoki Kita-machi
- Motoki Minami-machi
- Motoki Nishi-machi
- Nishi Arai
- Nishi Arai Honchō
- Ōgi
- Okino
- Sekihara

Senju Area

- Hinodemachi
- Senju
- Senju Motomachi
- Senju Akebono-chō
- Senju Asahi-chō
- Senju Azuma
- Senju Hashido-chō
- Senju Kawahara-chō
- Senju Kotobuki-chō
- Senju Midori-chō
- Senju Miyamoto-chō
- Senju Naka-chō
- Senju Nakai-chō
- Senju Ōkawa-chō
- Senju Sakuragi
- Senju Sekiya-chō
- Senju Tatsuta-chō
- Senju Yanagi-chō
- Yanagihara

Toneri Area

- Iriya
- Iriya-chō
- Kojiya
- Kojiya Honchō
- Toneri
- Toneri Kōen
- Tonerimachi

Umejima Area

- Chūō Honmachi
- Hirano
- Hitotsuya
- Kurihara
- Nishi Arai Sakae-chō
- Shimane
- Umeda
- Umejima

== Sights ==
=== Nishiarai Daishi ===
Nishiarai Daishi, located in Nishiarai, is a temple of the Buzan branch of Shingon Buddhism. Its formal name is Gochisan Henjōin Sōji-ji (Sōji-ji Temple). This is one of the Three Great Temples in the Kantō region along with Kawasaki Daishi and Sano Yakuyoke Daishi, and a large number of people annually visit the temple at New Year.

=== Parks ===
- Toneri Park:

Toneri Park is a metropolitan park located in Toneri. It is divided into east and west sections by Ogubashi Street. The west site has sports facilities such as an athletic stadium, tennis courts and baseball grounds. The east site has a big pond, water park and bird sanctuary. A part of the east site is now under construction. The park can be accessed by arriving at Toneri-kōen Station on the Nippori-Toneri Liner or by bus.

- Higashi Ayase Park:

Higashi Ayase Park is a metropolitan park that straddles the border between Ayase and Higashi Ayase. It contains Tokyo Budokan. Within the park, there is a Japanese garden which has a wide variety of plants. It also has sports facilities such as baseball and gateball grounds.

- Urban Agricultural Park:

Urban Agricultural Park (Toshi Nōgyō Kōen), located in Shikahama, is run by Adachi Ward. Officially, it is a part of Kōhoku Park. It is located near the meeting of the Shiba and Arakawa Rivers, and its south end faces a green space on the Arakawa river area. There are fields, orchards, greenhouses and other facilities that aim to show farming techniques that have been adopted in the suburbs of Tokyo. There are also facilities for families such as lawns and play equipment.

There is a rest house near the entrance on the Arakawa riverbank side. The rest house is at the point where the Arakawa and Shibakawa cycling roads meet. There is no admission fee. It is closed early in the morning and late at night, as well as all day on some days such as the year-end and new-year holidays. The park is far from the train station, but there is a bus running from Nishiarai Station to the park. The park is about a five-minute walk south of the bus stop Shikahama 5 on Kawaguchi Station line (Shikahama-Ryōke) and Akabane Station line (to Nishiarai Station by way of Arakawa Bridge). There is parking for cars and sightseeing buses under the Shuto Expressway Kawaguchi Route, and Shikahamabashi Exit and Higashi Ryōke Exit are nearby. The parking lot is also close to Kan-nana Road.

- Adachi Park of Living Things:

Adachi Park of Living Things, located within Motofuchie Park in Hokima, is run by Adachi Ward. The park is also home to over 500 various types of creatures, ranging from insects to mammals.

=== Halls and cultural facilities ===
- Tokyo Budokan:

Tokyo Budokan, located within Higashi Ayase Metropolitan Park, is a sports facility run by Tokyo Sport Benefits Corporation. The Tokyo Budokan has an avant-garde building designed by a famous architect Kijō Rokkaku. It includes places for martial arts and Kyūdō, and training rooms. The word budokan means "martial arts hall", and the same word is part of the name of the more-famous Nippon Budokan. The Tokyo Budokan's address is 3-20-1 Ayase, Adachi, Tokyo.

- Galaxy+City:

Galaxy+City (Gyarakushitii) is a generic term for series of cultural facilities in Kurihara. It used to be run by Adachi Lifelong Educational Promotion Corporation, but the management was taken over by Youth Centre of Adachi Board of Education on April 1, 2005. It contains two main facilities: Nishiarai Culture Hall (theatre) and Adachi Children's Science Museum. There are also event halls, cafes and others.

- Theatre 1010:

Theatre 1010 was named as it is because the number 1010 (Senjū) and the name of the theater's location (Senju) are homonyms in Japanese.

- Adachi Historical Museum:

Adachi Historical Museum, located within Higashifuchie Park in Ōyata, is run by Adachi Ward.

- Senju Thermal Power Station

== Education ==
The city's public high schools are operated by the Tokyo Metropolitan Government Board of Education.

The city's public elementary and junior high schools are operated by the Adachi City Board of Education (足立区教育委員会).

International schools:

- Tokyo Korean 4th Elementary and Junior High School (東京朝鮮第四初中級学校) - North Korean school

Tokyo Denki University is located in the area.

Tokyo Future University is located in the area.

== Sister cities ==
Adachi has sister-city relationships with Belmont, Australia. Within Japan, Adachi has similar ties with the city of Uonuma (formerly the town of Koide) in Niigata Prefecture, Yamanouchi in Nagano Prefecture, and the city of Kanuma in Tochigi Prefecture.

== Transportation ==
=== Rail ===
The primary railway station in the city is Kita-Senju Station.

■ JR East
■ Jōban Line - Kita-Senju - Ayase
■ Tobu Railway
■ Skytree Line - Horikiri - Ushida - Kita-Senju - Kosuge - Gotanno - Umejima - Nishiarai - Takenotsuka -
■ Daishi Line Nishiarai - Daishimae
■ Keisei Electric Railway
■ Keisei Main Line - Senju-Ōhashi - Keisei Sekiya -
■ Tokyo Metro
○ Hibiya Line - Kita-Senju
○ Chiyoda Line - Kita-Senju - Ayase - Kita-Ayase
■ Metropolitan Intercity Railway Company
■ Tsukuba Express - Kita-Senju - Aoi - Rokuchō -
■ Tokyo Metropolitan Bureau of Transportation
■ Nippori-Toneri Liner - Adachi-Odai - Ōgi-ōhashi - Kōya - Kōhoku - Nishiaraidaishi-nishi - Yazaike - Toneri-kōen - Toneri - Minumadai-shinsuikōen

=== Highways ===
Shuto Expressway

- No.6 Misato Route (Kosuge JCT - Misato JCT)
- C2 Central Loop (Itabashi JCT - Kasai JCT)
- S1 Kawaguchi Route (Kōhoku JCT - Kawaguchi JCT)

== Notable people ==
- Mika Akino, professional wrestler
- Atsuko Asano, actress
- Back-On, rock band
- Tochiazuma Daisuke, sumo wrestler
- Kouta Hirano, manga artist
- Susumu Hirasawa, progressive-electronic musician
- Itsuki Hirata, mixed martial artist
- Kazuki Hirata, professional wrestler
- Jo Kamisaku, murderer of Junko Furuta
- Kaela Kimura, singer and model
- Takeshi Kitano, comedian and filmmaker
- Daijiro Morohoshi, manga artist
- Nujabes, hip hop artist/producer
- Mayumi Ogawa, actress
- Masatoshi Ono, rock/heavy metal singer
- Tetsuya Naito, professional wrestler
- Tatsuki Seko, soccer player
- Tetsuya Shimizu, professional wrestler
- Daiki Sugioka, soccer player
- Yoshiko Tanaka, actress
- Kyohei Wada, professional wrestling referee
- Ayaka Yamashita, soccer player
- Kenta Yamazaki, soccer player
