= Nippori–Toneri Liner =

Automated people mover in Tokyo, Japan

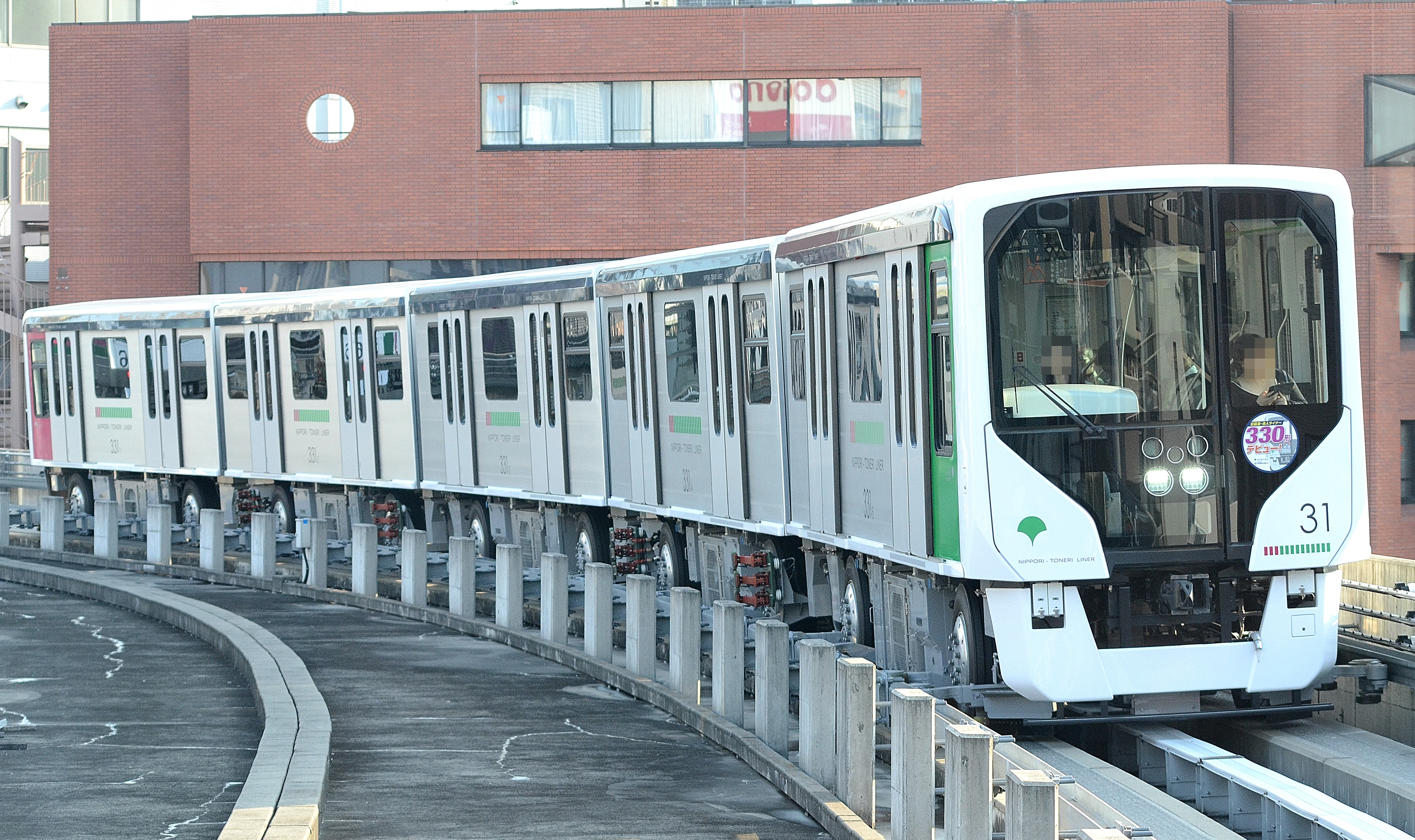
- A Nippori–Toneri Liner 330 series train

Overview
- Native name: 日暮里・舎人ライナー
- Status: In service
- Owner: Tokyo Metropolitan Bureau of Transportation (Toei)
- Locale: Tokyo
- Termini: Nippori; Minumadai-shinsuikōen
- Stations: 13

Service
- Type: Automated guideway transit
- Route number: NT
- Operator: Tokyo Metropolitan Bureau of Transportation
- Rolling stock: 300 series, 330 series, 320 series

History
- Opened: March 30, 2008; 18 years ago

Technical
- Line length: 9.7 km (6.0 mi)
- Number of tracks: 2
- Track gauge: 1,700 mm (5 ft 7 in)
- Electrification: Conductor rails, 600 V 50 Hz 3φ AC
- Operating speed: 60 km/h (35 mph)
Route map

The Nippori–Toneri Liner (Japanese: 日暮里・舎人ライナー, Hepburn: Nippori-Toneri-rainā) is an automated guideway transit (AGT) system between Nippori Station in Arakawa and Minumadai-shinsuikōen Station in Adachi, Tokyo, Japan. The line opened on 30 March 2008. It is operated by the Tokyo Metropolitan Bureau of Transportation (Toei).

Since its opening, the line has faced chronic rush-hour overcongestion, regularly ranking as one of the most crowded transit lines in Japan. Southbound congestion rates frequently exceed 170% to 180% capacity. This overcrowding is driven by rapid residential development in the Adachi and Arakawa commuter towns, which lack alternative rail corridors into central Tokyo. Because the line was built using smaller, five-car rubber-tired trainsets instead of conventional heavy rail, structural capacity constraints limit its ability to meet this massive commuting demand.

== Overview ==
The fully elevated, double-tracked line is 9.7 kilometres (6.0 mi) long with 13 stations, and it provides access to the Yamanote Line at both Nippori and Nishi-Nippori stations. A journey from end to end takes 20 minutes, compared to as long as 60 minutes by bus during rush hour.

In fiscal 2008, an average of 48,943 people used the line each day. This compares to a 2007 forecast of 51,000 passengers per day. By 2018, ridership grew to 90,737 passengers per day. In 2018, the Nippori Toneri Liner peaked at 189% capacity^{[a]} on the AM peak hour between Nishi-Nippori and Akado-shogakkomae stations. This level of crowding rivaled other bustling train lines in Tokyo, slotting in between the Tokaido line in Tokyo and the Keihin-Tohoku line, but at the time, the line was only operating with headways every 3-4 minutes during the AM rush.

== Station list ==
All stations are located in Tokyo.

No.	Station	Distance in km (mi)		Transfers	Location
No.	Station	Between stations	Total	Transfers	Location
NT01	Nippori 日暮里	—N/a	0 (0)	Jōban Line (Rapid) (JJ02); Keihin–Tōhoku Line (JK32); Yamanote Line (JY07); Main Line (KS02)	Arakawa
NT02	Nishi-Nippori 西日暮里	0.7 (0.43)	0.7 (0.43)	Keihin–Tōhoku Line (JK33); Yamanote Line (JY08); Chiyoda Line (C-16)	Arakawa
NT03	Akado-shōgakkōmae 赤土小学校前	1.0 (0.62)	1.7 (1.1)		Arakawa
NT04	Kumanomae 熊野前	0.6 (0.37)	2.3 (1.4)	Toden Arakawa Line (SA09)	Arakawa
NT05	Adachi-Odai 足立小台	0.7 (0.43)	3.0 (1.9)		Adachi
NT06	Ōgi-ōhashi 扇大橋	1.0 (0.62)	4.0 (2.5)		Adachi
NT07	Kōya 高野	0.5 (0.31)	4.5 (2.8)		Adachi
NT08	Kōhoku 江北	0.6 (0.37)	5.1 (3.2)		Adachi
NT09	Nishiaraidaishi-nishi 西新井大師西	0.9 (0.56)	6.0 (3.7)		Adachi
NT10	Yazaike 谷在家	0.8 (0.50)	6.8 (4.2)		Adachi
NT11	Toneri-kōen 舎人公園	0.9 (0.56)	7.7 (4.8)		Adachi
NT12	Toneri 舎人	1.0 (0.62)	8.7 (5.4)		Adachi
NT13	Minumadai-shinsuikōen 見沼代親水公園	1.0 (0.62)	9.7 (6.0)		Adachi

== Rolling stock ==
As of April 2020, services on the line are operated using:

- 300 series (16 five-car sets, since 30 March 2008)
- 330 series (3 five-car sets, since 10 October 2015)
- 320 series (1 five-car set, since 10 May 2017)

From its opening, the line has used a fleet of 300 series trainsets with stainless steel bodies. From 10 October 2015, one new 330 series trainset was introduced on the line. This five-car set was built by Mitsubishi Heavy Industries, and has an aluminium body. A new 320 series trainset (set 21) entered service on the line on 10 May 2017. Like the 330 series, this set has two pairs of sliding doors on the side of each car, and all seating is longitudinal bench seating.

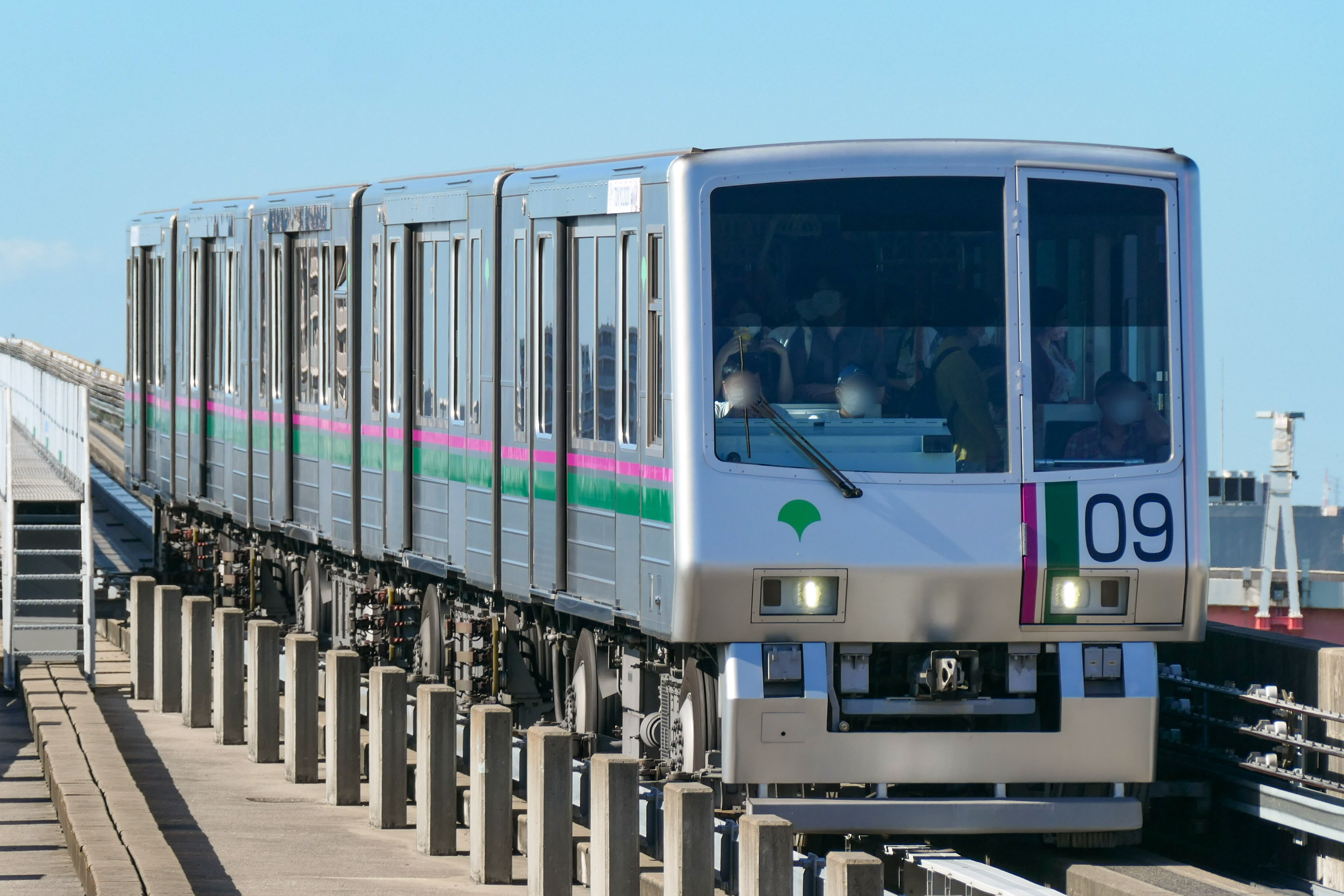
300 series set 09 in July 2021

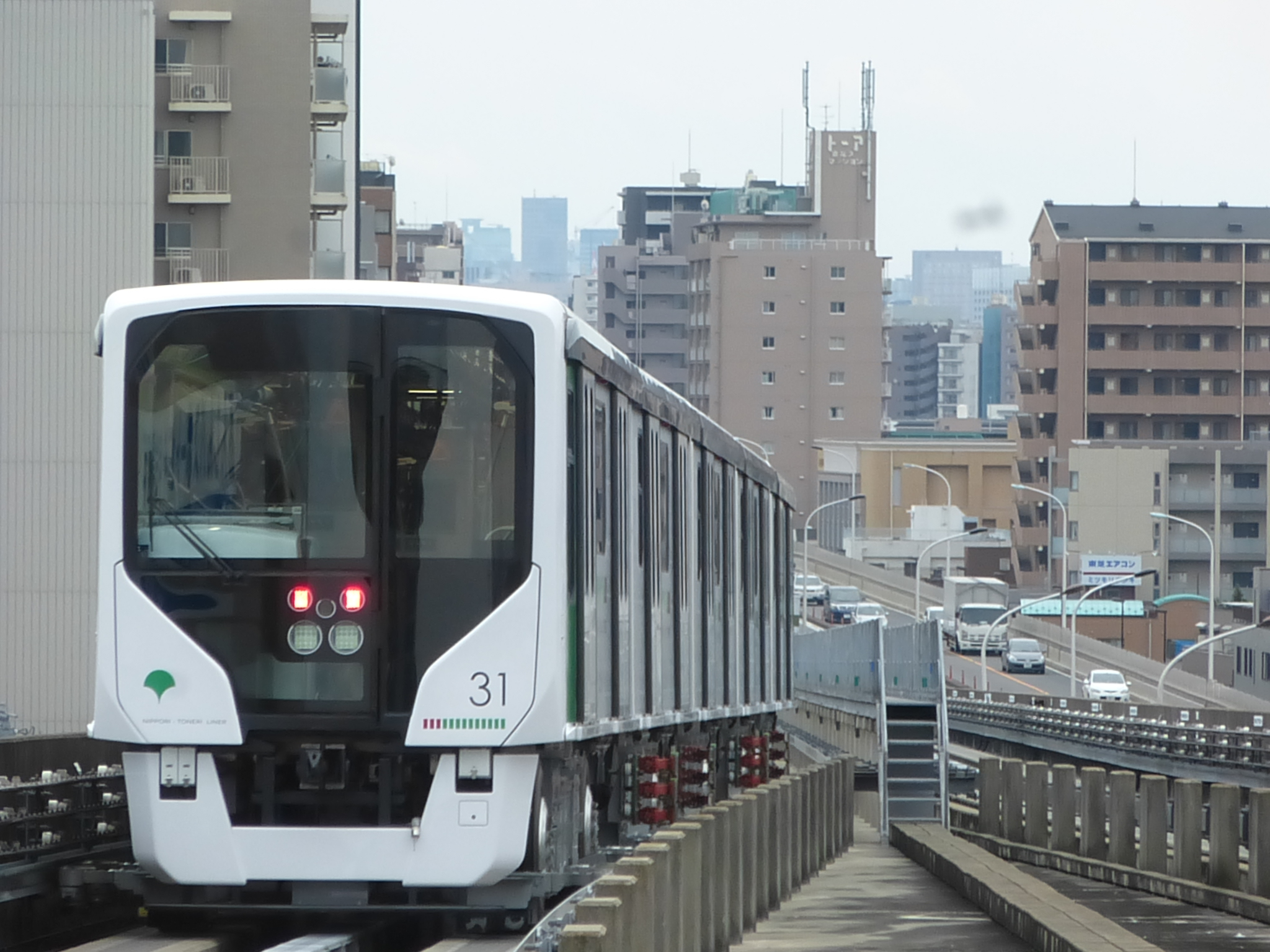
330 series set 31 undergoing testing in September 2015

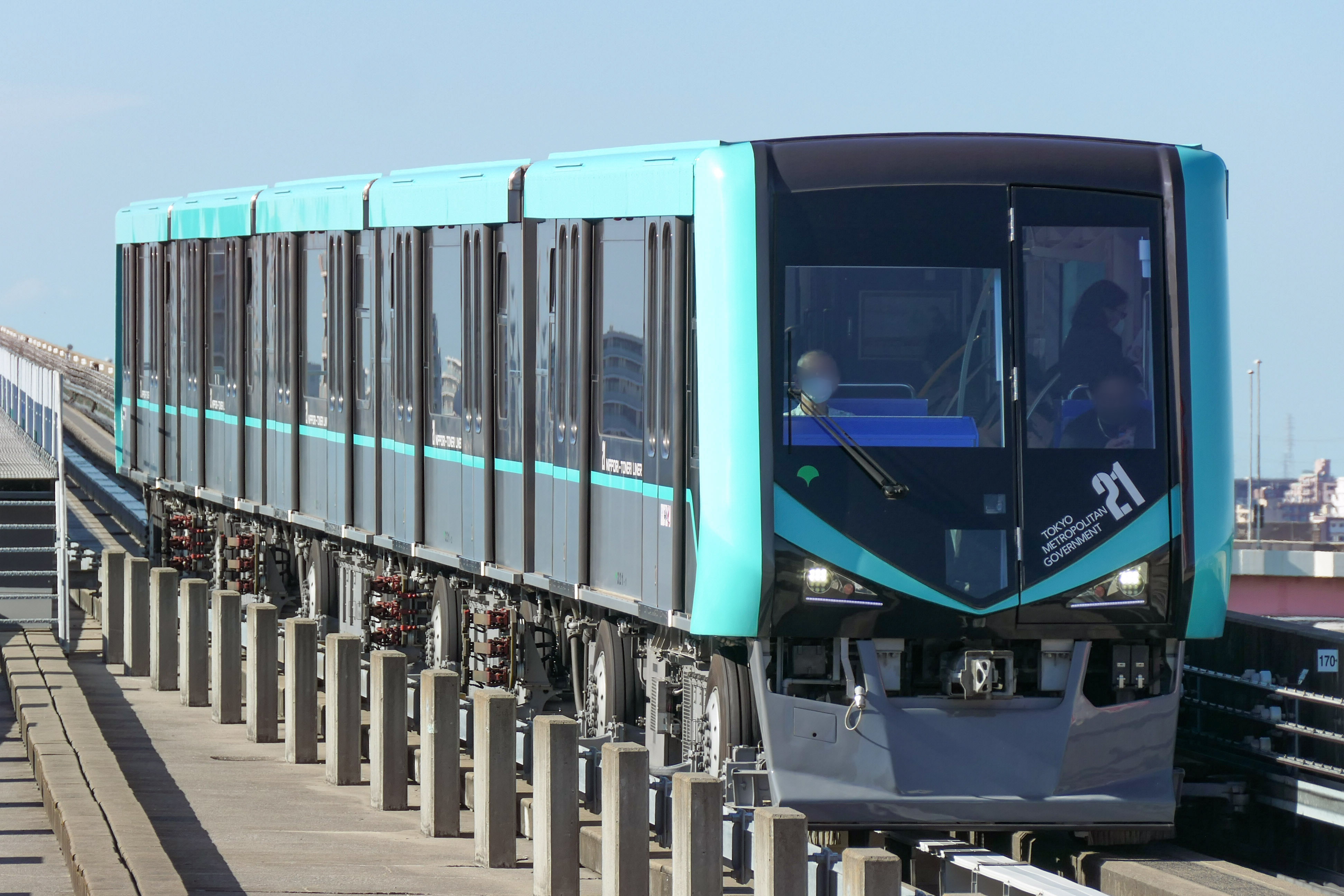
320 series set 21 in July 2021

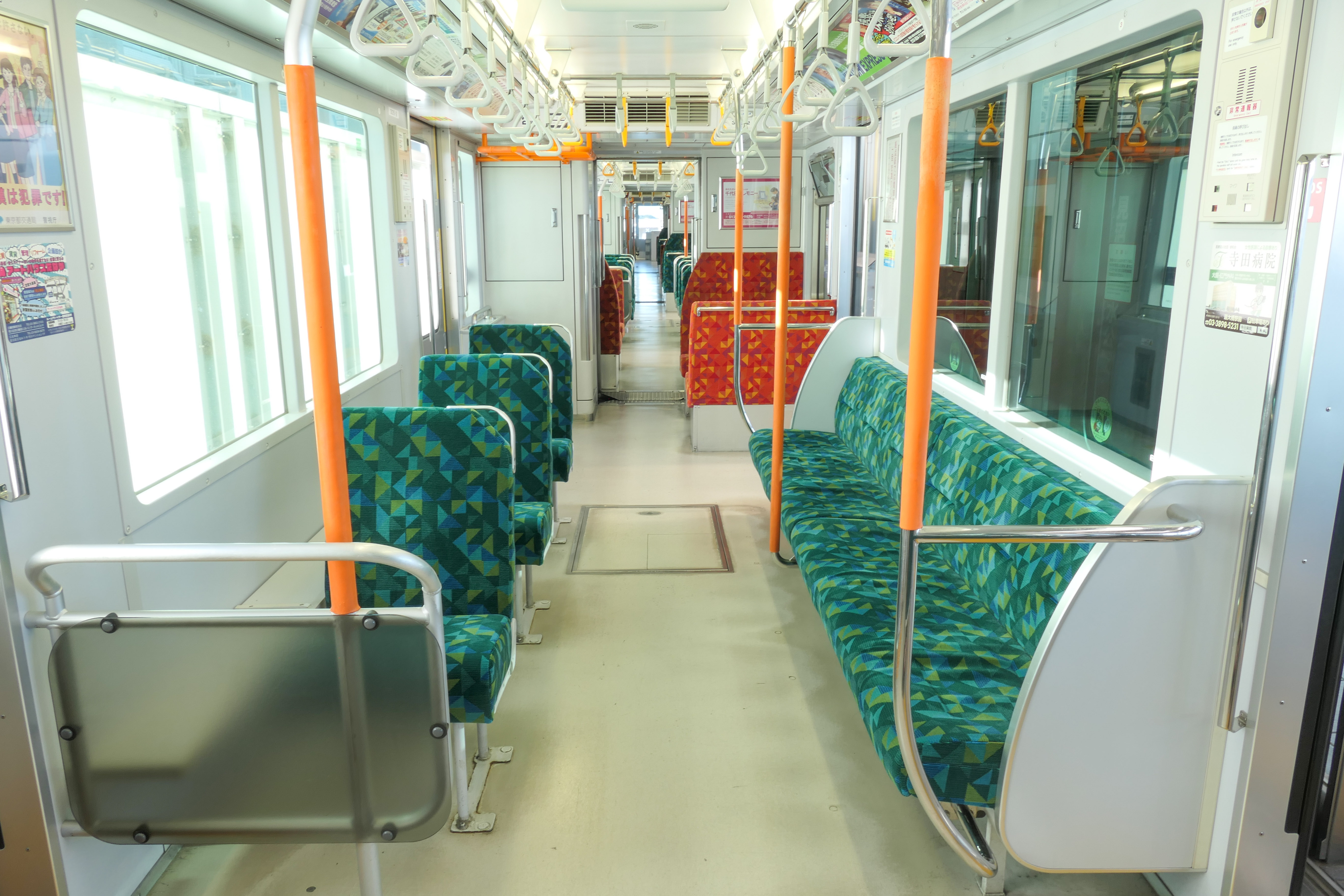
The interior of a 300 series set in July 2021

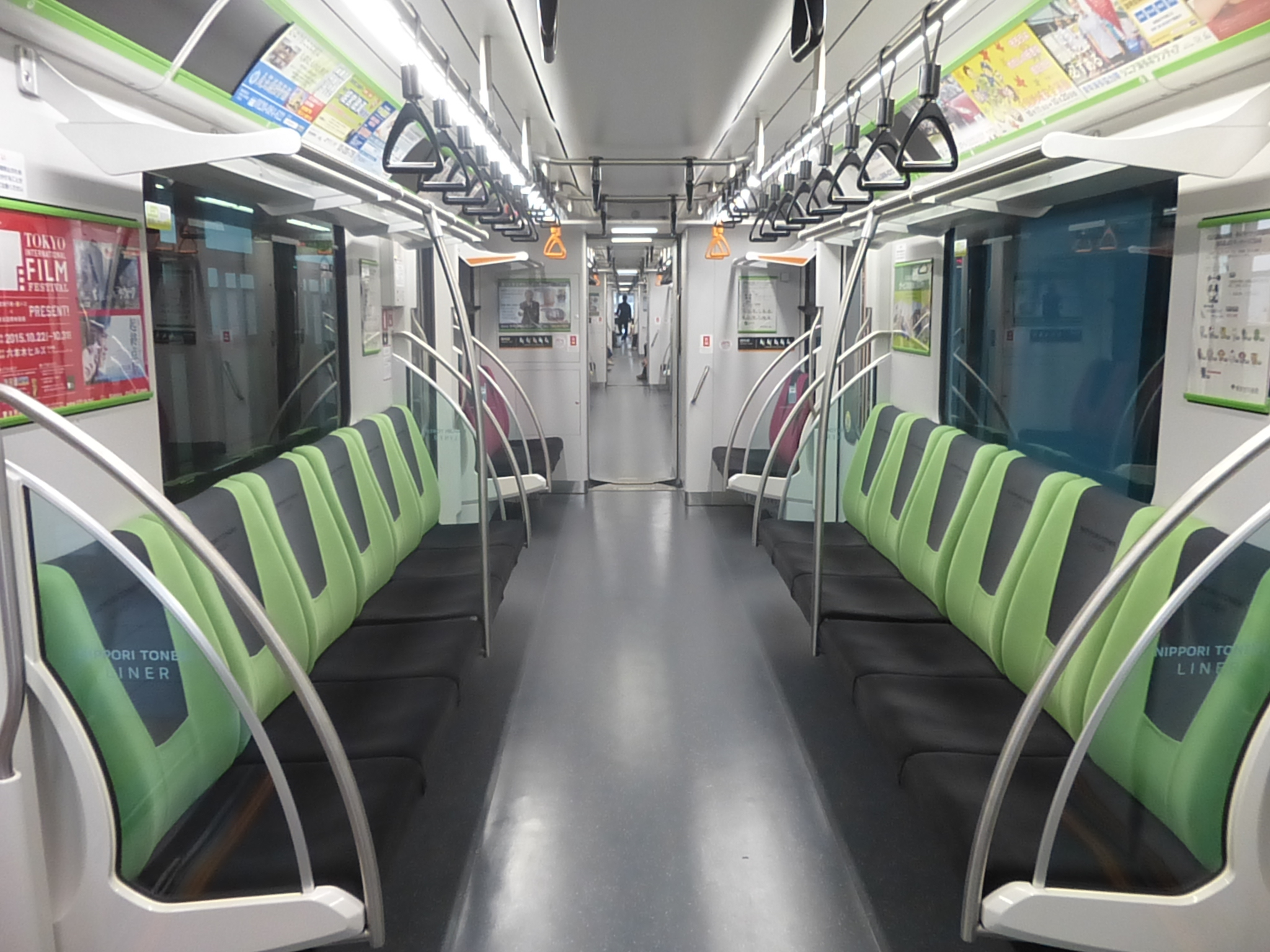
The interior of a 330 series set in October 2015

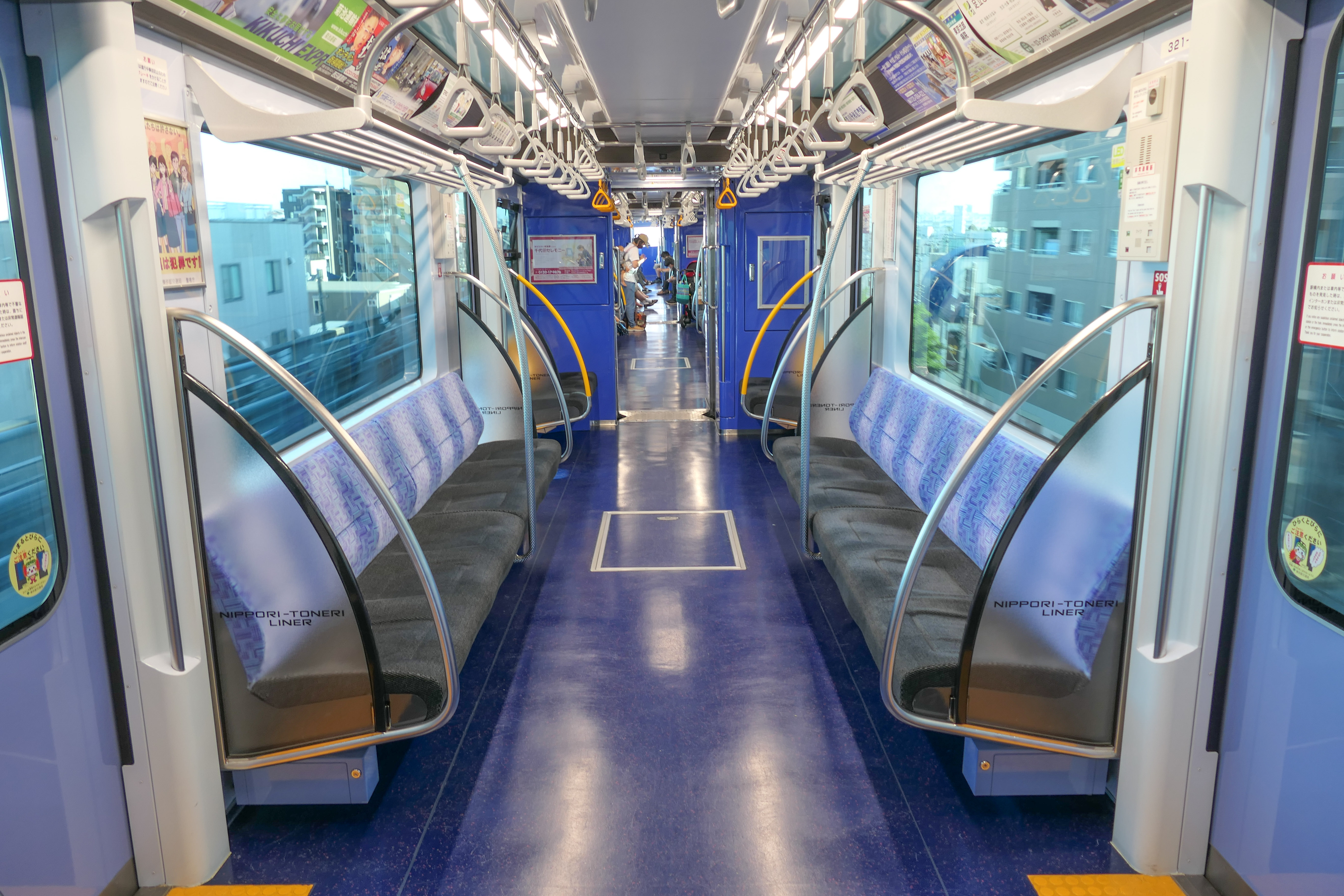
The interior of a 320 series set in July 2021

Nippori-Toneri Liner and 300 series train near Minumadai-shinsuikōen Station, November 2014

== History ==
The western part of Adachi is poorly served by public transport and planning of the line started in 1985, with the initial intention of constructing a full-fledged subway. However, this was scrapped due to the high cost and projected low ridership, and a more cost-efficient AGT system was selected instead. Construction of the line started in 1997, and service commenced on 30 March 2008. The main contractor was the Tokyo Metropolitan Subway Construction Company, which also built the Toei Oedo Line.

== Accidents ==
A 5.9 magnitude earthquake partly derailed three cars of a train of the Nippori–Toneri Liner at 10:41 pm on Thursday, 7 October 2021. Three passengers were injured, but there were no fatalities. Repair works were expected to last several days.

== Notes ==
a. Crowding levels defined by the Ministry of Land, Infrastructure, Transport and Tourism:

100% — Commuters have enough personal space and are able to take a seat or stand while holding onto the straps or hand rails.
150% — Commuters have enough personal space to read a newspaper.
180% — Commuters must fold newspapers to read.
200% — Commuters are pressed against each other in each compartment but can still read small magazines.
250% — Commuters are pressed against each other, unable to move.
