= Nippori Station =

Railway station in Tokyo, Japan

Coordinates: 35.727588°N 139.770781°E

NPRJY07 JK32 JJ02 KS02 NT01 Nippori Station 日暮里駅
- Elevated view of Nippori station in May 2026

General information
- Location: 2 Nishi-Nippori, Arakawa-ku, Tokyo; Japan
- Operator: JR East; Keisei Electric Railway; Toei
- Lines: Tōhoku Main Line; Jōban Line; Keisei Main Line; Nippori–Toneri Liner
- Connections: Bus terminal

Other information
- Station code: NPR (JR East); JJ02 (Jōban Line (Rapid)); JK32 (Keihin-Tōhoku Line); JY07 (Yamanote Line); KS02 (Keisei Line); NT01 (Nippori–Toneri Liner)

History
- Opened: April 1, 1905

Passengers
- FY2024: 214,154 daily; 32,438 daily; 101,435 daily

Services
Preceding station	JR East	Following station
Nishi-Nippori JY08 Next counter-clockwise	Yamanote Line	Uguisudani JY06 Next clockwise
Nishi-Nippori JK33 towards Ōmiya	Keihin–Tōhoku Line Local	Uguisudani JK31 towards Yokohama
Ueno towards Shinagawa	Tokiwa (limited service)	Kashiwa JJ07 towards Takahagi
Ueno towards Shinagawa	Jōban Line Special Rapid	Kita-Senju JJ05 towards Tsuchiura
Ueno towards Shinagawa	Jōban Line (Rapid) Rapid	Mikawashima JJ03 towards Toride
Ueno towards Shinagawa	Jōban Line Local-Futsuu	Mikawashima JJ03 towards Sendai
Commuter services
Preceding station	Keisei	Following station
Keisei Ueno KS01 Terminus	Skyliner	Narita Airport Terminal 2·3 KS41 towards Narita Airport Terminal 1
Keisei Ueno KS01 Terminus	Skyliner	Aoto KS09 (limited service) towards Narita Airport Terminal 1
Keisei Ueno KS01 Terminus	Morningliner; Eveningliner	Aoto KS09 towards Narita Airport Terminal 1
Keisei Ueno KS01 Terminus	Main Line Rapid Limited Express	Aoto KS09 towards Narita Airport Terminal 1
Keisei Ueno KS01 Terminus	Main Line Access Express	Aoto KS09 towards Keisei Takasago
Keisei Ueno KS01 Terminus	Main Line Limited Express Commuter Express	Aoto KS09 towards Narita Airport Terminal 1
Keisei Ueno KS01 Terminus	Main Line Rapid	Senjuōhashi KS05 towards Narita Airport Terminal 1
Keisei Ueno KS01 Terminus	Main Line Local	Shim-Mikawashima KS03 towards Narita Airport Terminal 1
Preceding station	Toei	Following station
Nishi-Nippori NT02 towards Minumadai-shinsuikōen	Nippori–Toneri Liner	Terminus
Former services
Preceding station	Keisei	Following station
Hakubutsukan-Dōbutsuen Closed 1997 towards Keisei Ueno	Main Line Local	Shim-Mikawashima towards Narita Airport Terminal 1
Location
- Location within Tokyo Yamanote Loop Location within Tokyo wards area Location within Japan

Nippori Station (日暮里駅, Nippori-eki) is a major interchange railway station in Arakawa, Tokyo, Japan. It is adjacent to the Yanaka neighborhood of Taito district.

== Lines ==
- East Japan Railway Company (JR East)
  - Joban Line (Rapid)
  - Keihin–Tōhoku Line
  - Yamanote Line
- Keisei Electric Railway
  - Keisei Main Line
- Toei
  - Nippori–Toneri Liner

The station is an intersection of JR and Keisei systems. Although Keisei Ueno Station, the terminal of Keisei, is also located adjacent to JR East's Ueno Station, Nippori Station provides easier transfer.

== Platforms ==
=== Keisei platforms ===
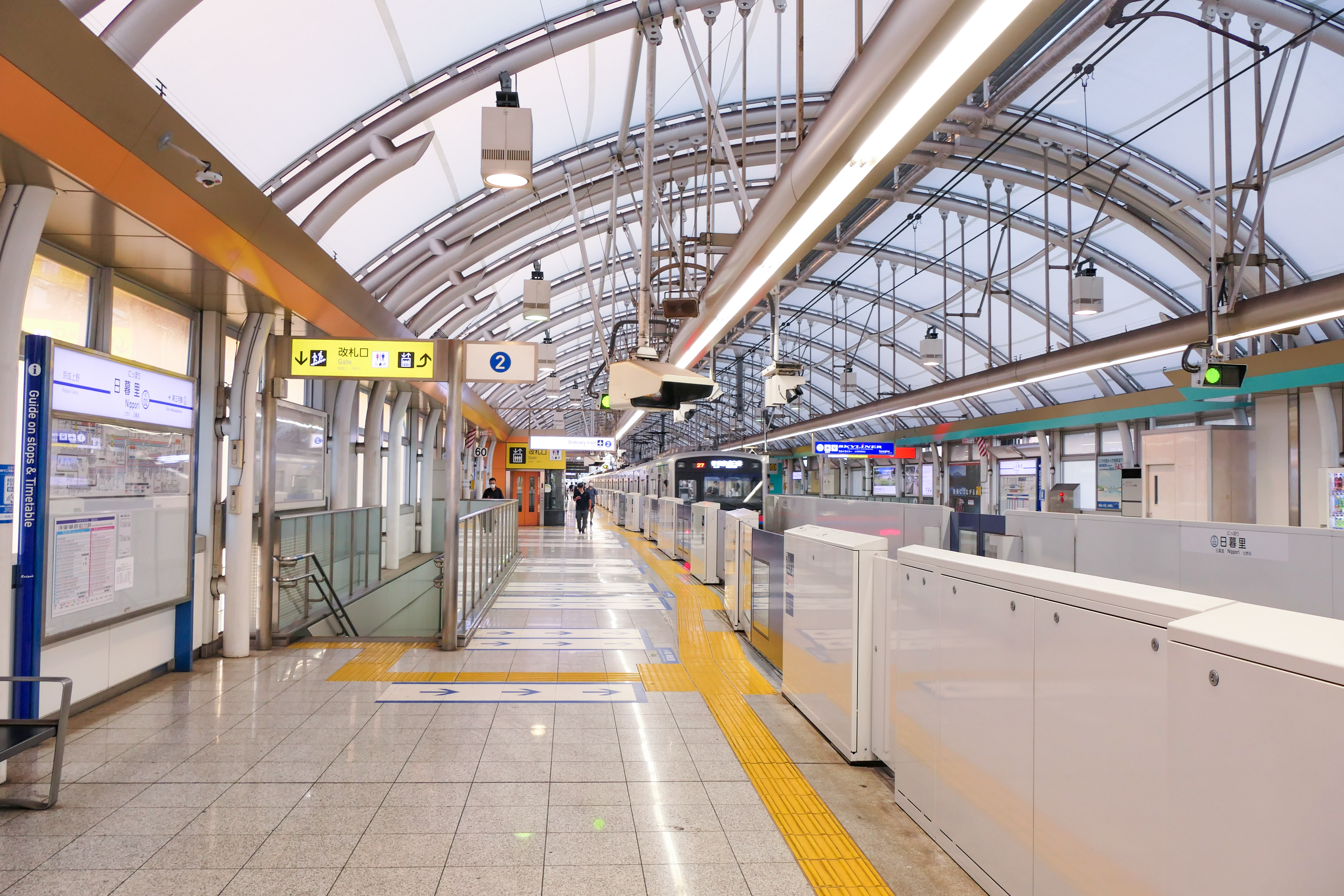
Keisei elevated platform in July 2021

A new elevated platform serving outbound Keisei trains opened to traffic on October 3, 2009. The new elevated line has two side platforms serving a single track. One platform serves as a boarding platform for Skyliner, Cityliner, and Eveningliner limited express services, while the other as a boarding platform for regular commuter trains. Ueno-bound trains continue to discharge on the original platform on the lower level.

0	Keisei Main Line	for Keisei Ueno
1	Keisei Main Line	for Narita Airport (Terminal 2·3 and Terminal 1) via Narita Sky Access Line (Skyliner limited express trains)
1	Keisei Main Line	for Keisei Funabashi, Keisei Narita and Narita Airport via Keisei Main Line (Eveningliner limited express trains)
2	Keisei Main Line	for Aoto, Shin-Kamagaya and Narita Airport via Narita Sky Access Line (Access Express trains)
2	Keisei Main Line	for Aoto, Keisei Funabashi, Keisei Narita and Narita Airport via Keisei Main Line (Local, Rapid, Commuter Express and Limited Express trains)

=== JR platforms ===
There are no platforms for tracks 5 to 8, which are for non-stop Takasaki Line and Utsunomiya Line trains.

3	Jōban Line (Rapid)	for Ueno; Ueno–Tokyo Line for Tokyo and Shinagawa
4	Jōban Line (Rapid)	for Kita-Senju, Toride, Tsuchiura and Narita
9	Keihin–Tōhoku Line	for Ueno, Tokyo, Shinagawa and Yokohama
10	Yamanote Line (clockwise)	for Ueno and Tokyo
11	Yamanote Line (anti-clockwise)	for Ikebukuro and Shinjuku
12	Keihin-Tōhoku Line	for Tabata, Akabane and Ōmiya

=== Nippori-Toneri platforms ===
The Nippori–Toneri Liner station is elevated and consists of a single island platform serving two tracks.

== History ==
The JR station first opened on 1 April 1905. The Keisei station opened on 19 December 1931.

A new elevated platform for Keisei services opened on 3 October 2009. Station numbering was introduced to all Keisei Line stations on 17 June 2010 with Nippori being assigned station number KS02.

Station numbering was introduced in 2016 with Nippori being assigned station numbers JY07 for the Yamanote line, JK32 for the Keihin-Tōhoku line, and JJ02 for the Joban Line rapid service. At the same time, JR East assigned a three-letter code to their major interchange station; Nippori was assigned the three-letter code "NPR". Station numbering was expanded to the Nippori–Toneri Liner platforms in November 2017 with the station receiving station number NT02.

== Passenger statistics ==
In fiscal 2013, the JR East station was used by an average of 102,817 passengers daily (boarding passengers only), making it the 37th-busiest station operated by JR East. In fiscal 2013, the Keisei station was used by an average of 96,428 passengers per day (exiting and entering passengers), making it the third-busiest station operated by Keisei. Over the same fiscal year, the Toei station was used by an average of 20,421 per day (boarding passengers only), making it the busiest station on the Nippori–Toneri Liner. The daily average passenger figures (boarding passengers only) for the JR East station in previous years are as shown below.

Fiscal year	Daily average
2000	77,469
2005	78,921
2010	96,633
2011	96,747
2012	99,875
2013	102,817

== Surrounding area ==
- Yanaka Cemetery
- Yanaka-Ginza Shopping District
- Yūyake-dandan Stairs
- Fujimizaka Hill
- Tokyo Women's Medical University Medical Center East

== Connecting bus services ==
Toei Bus operates local bus services from the following Nippori Station bus stops.

Stop No.	Japanese	Reading	For
1	里22	Sato 22	Kameido Station
2	都08	To 08	Kinshichō Station
3	里48	Sato 48	Minumadai-shinsuikōen Station
3	里48-2	Sato 48-2	Kaga Danchi

== See also ==
- List of railway stations in Japan
