= Minumadai-shinsuikōen Station =

Railway station in Tokyo, Japan

Coordinates: 35°48′52″N 139°46′15″E

NT13 Minumadai-shinsuikōen Station 見沼代親水公園駅
- Minumadai-shinsuikōen Station, 2025

General information
- Location: 2-21-13 Toneri, Adachi, Tokyo （足立区舎人2丁目21-13） Japan
- Operator: Toei
- Line: Nippori–Toneri Liner
- Platforms: 1 island platform
- Tracks: 2

Construction
- Structure type: Elevated

Other information
- Station code: 12

History
- Opened: 30 March 2008; 18 years ago

Services
Preceding station	Toei	Following station
Terminus	Nippori–Toneri Liner	Toneri NT12 towards Nippori
Location
- Location within Special wards of Tokyo Location within Tokyo Location within Japan

Minumadai-shinsuikōen Station (見沼代親水公園駅, Minumadai-shinsuikōen-eki) is a train station located in Adachi, Tokyo, Japan.

== Lines ==
- Tokyo Metropolitan Bureau of Transportation
  - Nippori-Toneri Liner

== Platforms ==
1・2	■ Nippori-Toneri Liner	for Nippori

== History ==
The station opened on 30 March 2008, when the Nippori-Toneri Liner began operation.

Station numbering was introduced in November 2017 with the station receiving station number NT13.
