= Tokyo Metropolitan Bureau of Transportation =

Public transport operator in Tokyo, Japan

- 東京都交通局

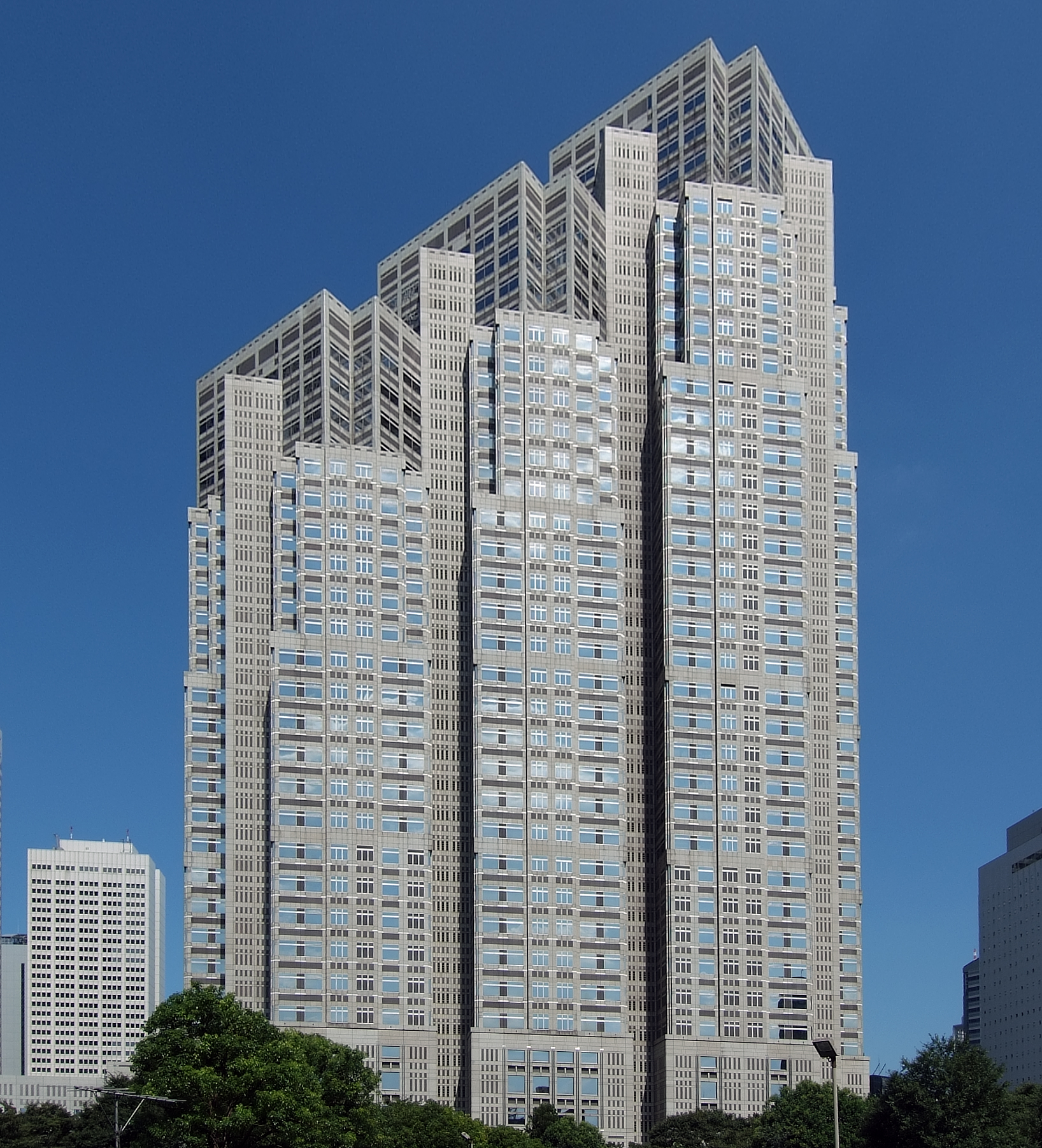

Agency overview
- Type: Local public entreprise
- Jurisdiction: Japan
- Headquarters: 2 Chome-8-1 Nishi-shinjuku, Shinjuku City, Tokyo 160-0023
- Website: Official website

The Tokyo Metropolitan Bureau of Transportation (Japanese: 東京都交通局, Hepburn: Tōkyō-to Kōtsū-kyoku), also known as Toei Transportation (都営交通, Toei Kōtsū), Toei Transport, or simply Toei (都営), (Note: Toei means "operated (ei) by the metropolis (to, referring to the metropolitan government).") is a bureau of the Tokyo Metropolitan Government which operates public transport services in Tokyo. Among its services, the Toei Subway is one of two rapid transit systems which make up the Tokyo subway system, the other being Tokyo Metro.

== History ==
Crest of the Bureau, based on the Metropolitan Crest. This crest appears in the Toei 9000 series tramcars.

=== Establishment ===
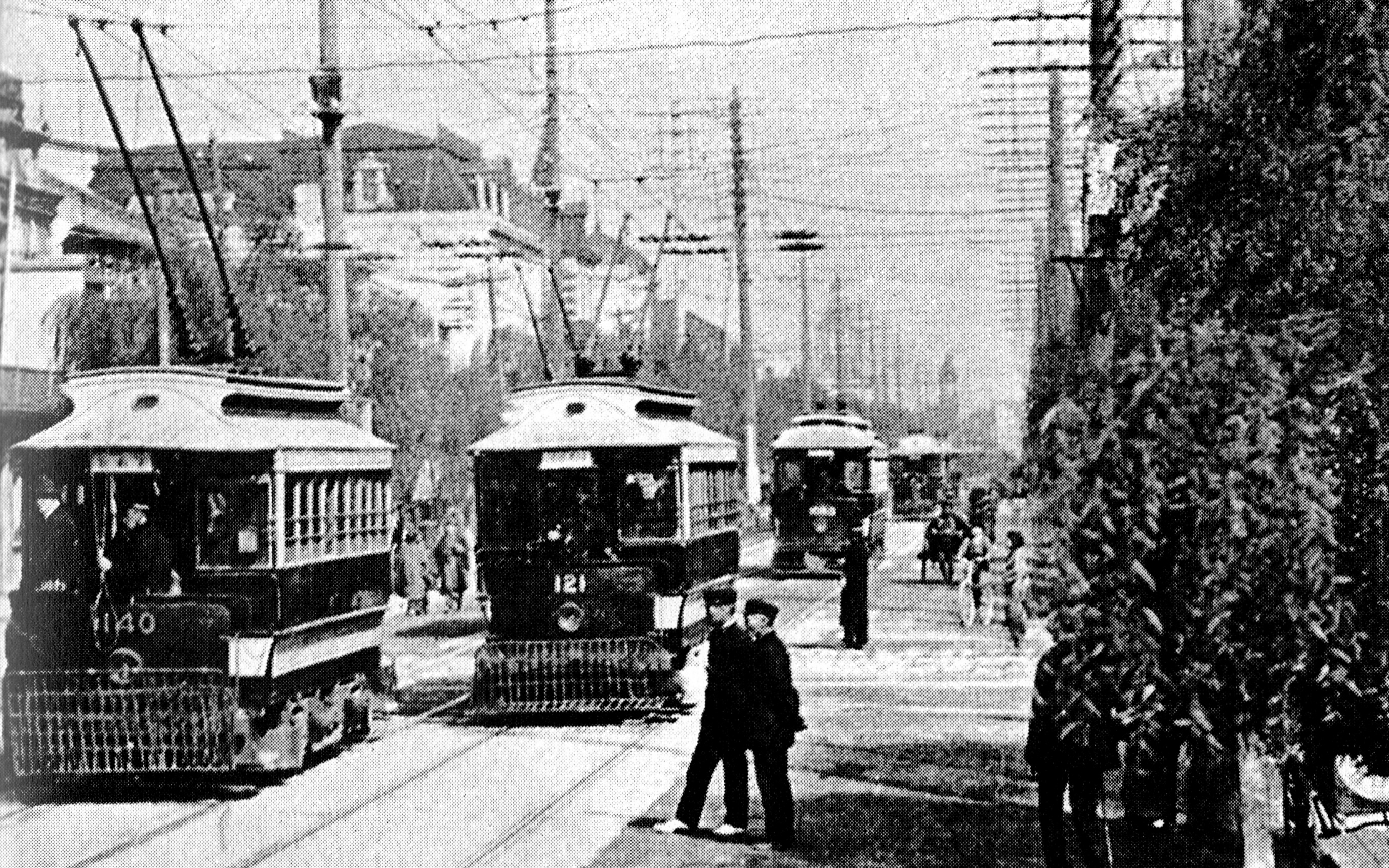
Tokyo Electric Railway tram running on Ginza Street in 1912.

Tokyo City purchased the Tokyo Railway Company, a streetcar operator, in 1911, and placed its lines under the authority of the Tokyo Municipal Electric Bureau (東京市電気局, Tokyo-shi Denki Kyoku). The TMEB began bus service in 1924 as an emergency measure after the Great Kantō earthquake knocked out streetcar service in the city. (The TMEB was also responsible for providing electric power to Tokyo, but this service was privatized in 1942 as Tokyo Electric).

In 1942, the Japanese government forced a number of private transit businesses in Tokyo to merge into the TMEB. These included the bus lines of the Tokyo Underground Railway (whose Ginza Line remained independent), the Keio Electric Railway and the Tokyu Corporation, as well as the Oji Electric Tramway (operator of the Arakawa Line) and several smaller bus companies.

In 1943, Tokyo City was abolished and the TMEB's operations were transferred to the new TMBT.

== Toei Subway ==
Toei Subway operates 4 rapid transit (subway) lines which complement the 9 lines operated by Tokyo Metro.

== Tokyo Sakura Tram ==
Tokyo Sakura Tram (the public name of the Toden Arakawa Line, the sole remaining line of Tokyo's once-extensive streetcar system) is a 30-station hybrid light rail/tram line.

== Nippori-Toneri Liner ==
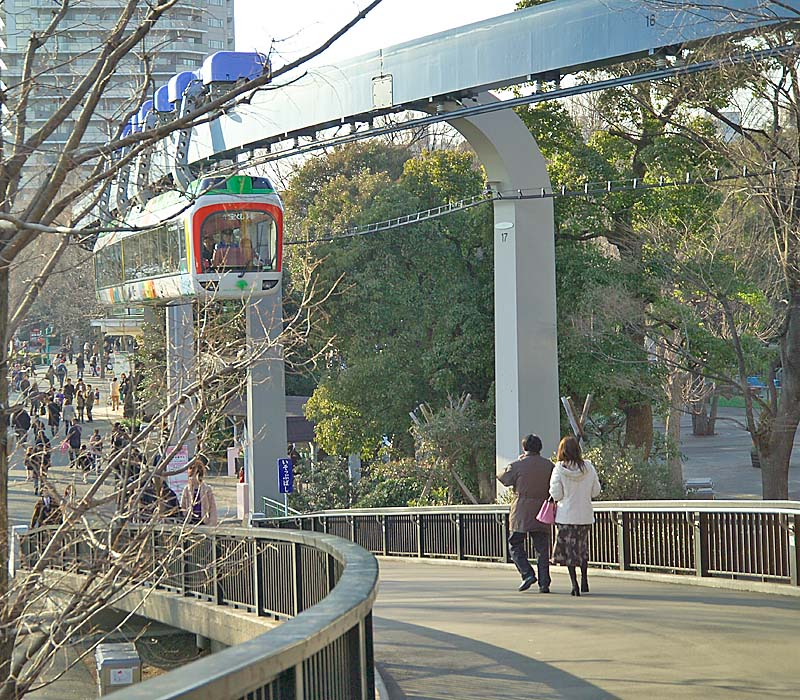
The Ueno Zoo Monorail carried passengers within the Ueno Zoo.

Nippori-Toneri Liner is a 13-station, 9.7 km (6.0 mi) long automated guideway transit system which commenced operation on March 30, 2008.

== Ueno Zoo Monorail (Closed) ==
Ueno Zoo Monorail was a 300-metre (980 ft) long suspended monorail inside the grounds of Ueno Zoo which commenced operation on December 17, 1957. Operation was suspended on October 31, 2019, and never recommenced with the line being officially closed on December 27, 2023.

== Bus lines ==
Toei operates local bus service in central Tokyo, generally to fill in the gaps unserved by the Tokyo Metro and Toei Subway networks.

Most routes are designated by a kanji character followed by a two-digit route number. The initial character usually indicates the main railway station where the line terminates: for instance, 渋66 (Shibu 66) is a suburban route from Shibuya Station. Some routes replace the initial character with Latin letters, one prominent example being the RH01 service between Roppongi Hills and Shibuya. Others use a special character derived from the route, such as 虹01 (Niji [Rainbow] 01) which crosses the Rainbow Bridge. Some cross-town routes begin with the character 都 (to "metropolitan").

As of March 2024, the Tokyo Metropolitan Government had added 73 fuel cell buses to its bus fleet operated by the Bureau of Transportation.

== Other services ==
Tokyo Metropolitan Bureau of Transportation also maintains a large fiber-optic cable network in the city, as well as several electric power generators.

=== Trolley buses ===
TMBT operated electric trolley buses between 1952 and 1968 on four routes:

- Route 101: Imai - Kameido - Oshiage - Asakusa - Ueno
- Route 102: Ikebukuro - Shibuya - Naka-meguro - Gotanda - Shinagawa
- Route 103: Ikebukuro - Oji - San'ya - Kameido
- Route 104: Ikebukuro - Oji - Asakusa

The trolley buses were short-lived, however, mostly owing to their vulnerability to weather: rain caused problems with the overhead power supply, and snow required tire chains to be installed on vehicles in order to maintain traction.
