= Zōshigaya =

Neighbourhood in Toshima-ku, Tokyo

Coordinates: 35°43′12″N 139°43′14″E

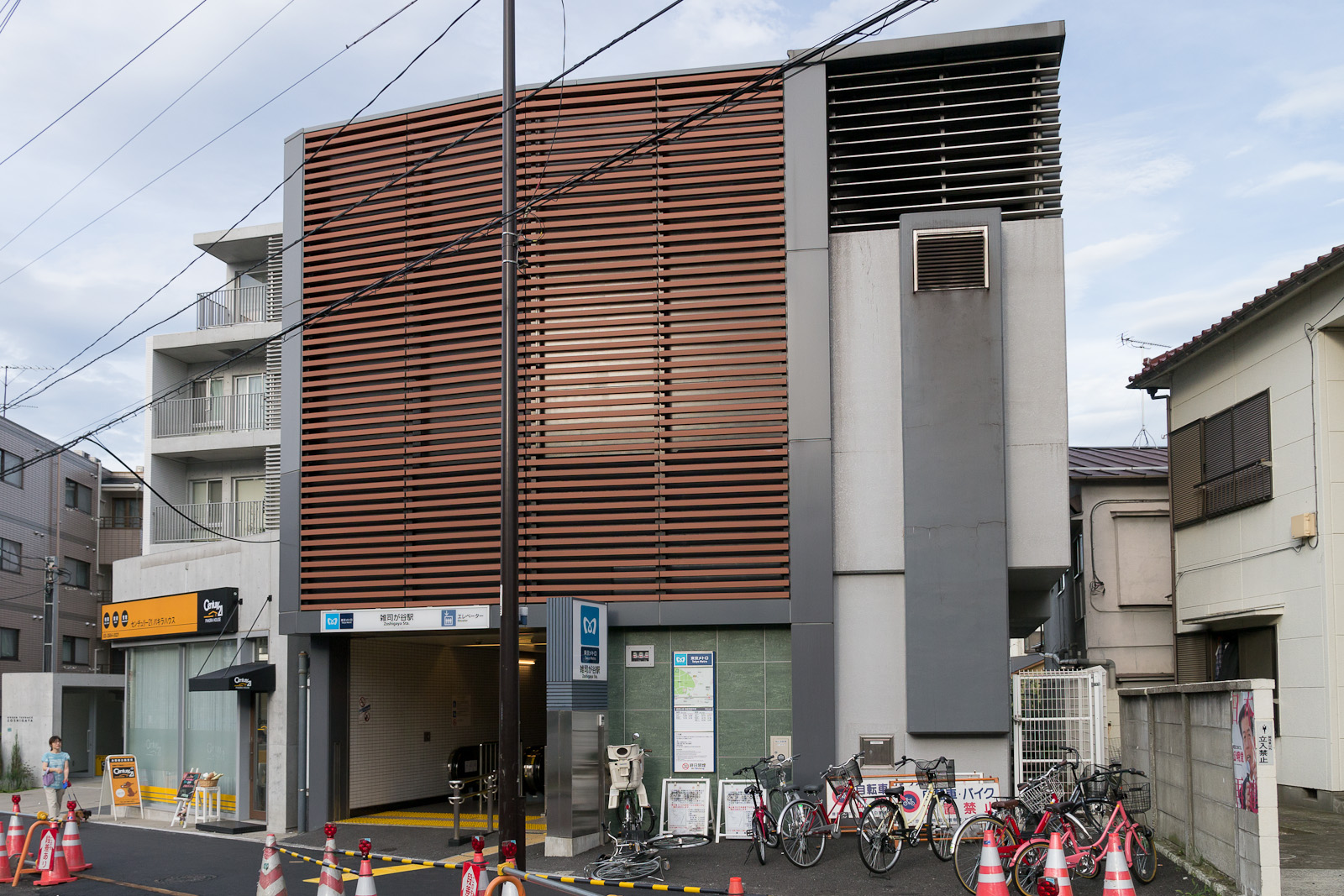
Tokyo-Metro-Zoshigaya-Station-00

Zōshigaya (雑司が谷, also 雑司ヶ谷) is a neighborhood in Toshima, Tokyo. Zōshigaya includes Zōshigaya 1-chome though Zōshigaya 3-chome as well as parts of Minami-Ikebukuro.

== Major locations ==
- Zōshigaya Cemetery, in Minami-Ikebukuro
- Two sequential Tokyo Sakura Tram train stations:
  - Kishibojimmae Station
  - Toden-zoshigaya Station, in Minami-Ikebukuro
- A Tokyo Metro Fukutoshin Line train station:
  - Zōshigaya Station (Tokyo Metro), constructed directly underneath Kishibojimmae Station

== See also ==
- Kishibojin is Japanese for Hariti, a Buddhist goddess
