= Kasumi Kaikan Memorial Gakushuin Museum =

Museum in Toshima, Tokyo, Japan

- 霞会館記念学習院ミュージアム
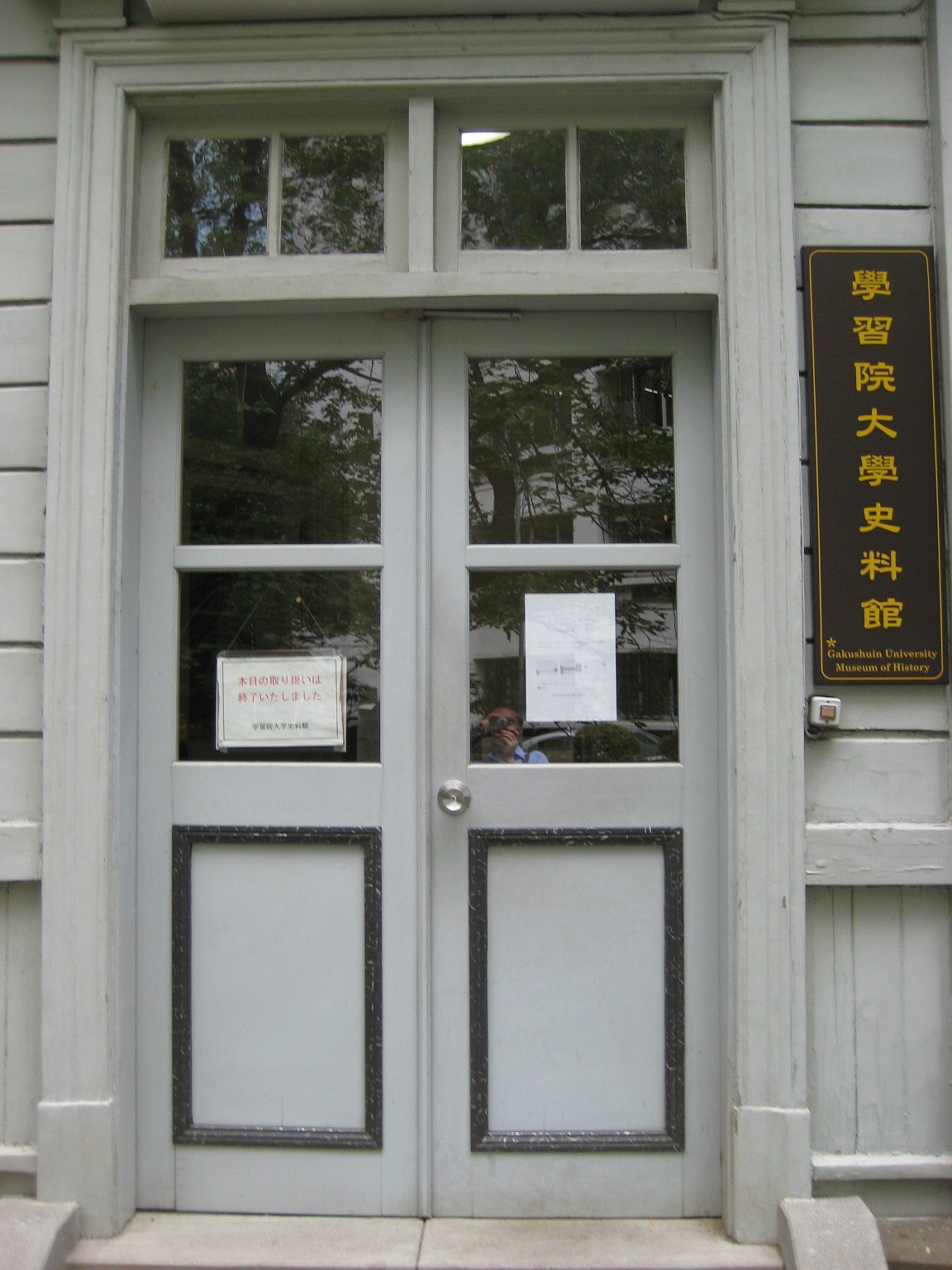
- Entrance to the former Gakushuin University Museum of History
- Interactive map of the Kasumi Kaikan Memorial Gakushuin Museum area

General information
- Location: 1-5-1 Mejiro, Toshima, Tokyo, Japan
- Coordinates: 35°43′08″N 139°42′35″E
- Opened: 14 March 2025 (reopening); 1975 (original opening)

Website
- Official website (in Japanese)

Gakushuin University Museum of History (学習院大学史料館) [ja] opened in Toshima, Tokyo, Japan in 1975, before relocating a short distance and reopening in 2025 as Kasumi Kaikan Memorial Gakushuin Museum (霞会館記念学習院ミュージアム, Kasumi Kaikan Kinen Gakushūin Myūjiamu). A university museum affiliated with Gakushuin University, the collection numbers some 250,000 items, including artefacts relating to the Imperial Family (the Emperor is a graduate of the university, and Princess Akiko was in attendance at the reopening ceremony).

== See also ==
- List of museums in Tokyo
- Zoshigaya Missionary Museum
- Kasumi Kaikan
