= Toshima Incineration Plant =

Incineration plant located in Kami-ikebukuro, Toshima, Tokyo

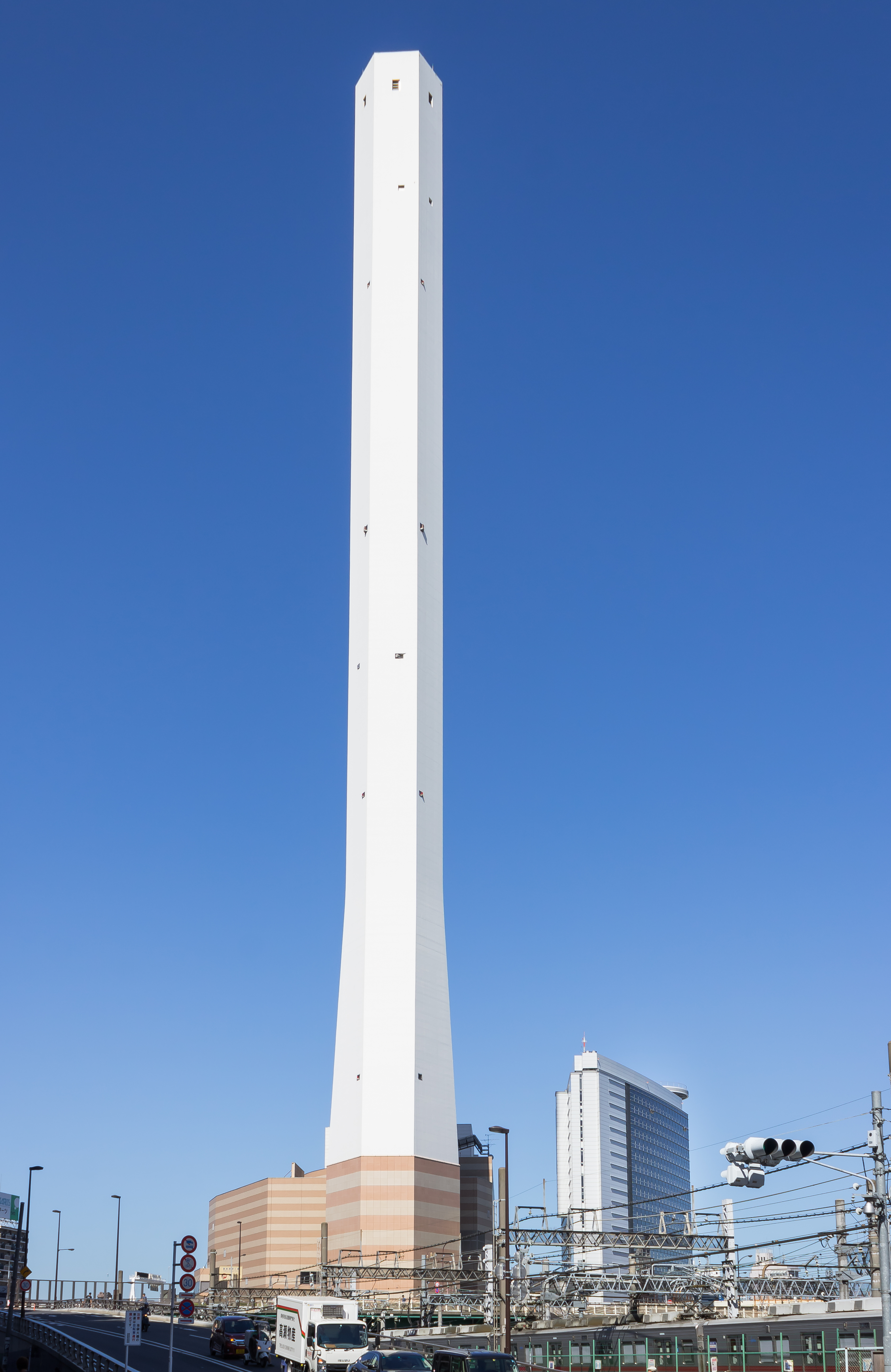
- Interactive map of the Toshima Incineration Plant area

General information
- Status: Completed
- Location: 5-1, 2 Kami-ikebukuro, Toshima, Tokyo, Japan
- Coordinates: 35.734678°N 139.714422°E
- Construction started: September 1995
- Completed: June 1999
- Cost: 16.9 billion yen

Height
- Height: 210 m (690 ft)

The Toshima Incineration Plant (豊島清掃工場) is a waste treatment plant located in Kami-ikebukuro, Toshima, Tokyo, Japan. It covers an area of 12,000 square meters and has two incineration units with a combined capacity of 400 tons of waste per day.

The plant was constructed with a large fitness center in order to appease area residents who may have otherwise opposed its construction. The center's swimming pool is heated from burning garbage while electricity is supplied from a steam-driven turbine. The plant outputs 7,800 kW of electricity, enough to supply 20,000 homes.

The plant's smokestack, at 210 meters in height, is the tallest industrial chimney in the special wards of Tokyo and was constructed in order for exhaust from the plant to clear the nearby 239-meter Sunshine 60 building.
