= Yukio Takano =

Japanese businessman and politician (1937–2023)

- 高野 之夫

Mayor of Toshima
- In office 27 April 1999 – 9 February 2023
- Preceded by: Kazutoshi Katō
- Succeeded by: Miyuki Takagiwa

Member of the Tokyo Metropolitan Assembly
- In office 23 July 1989 – March 1999
- Constituency: Toshima Ward

Member of the Toshima City Assembly
- In office 1 May 1983 – June 1989

Personal details
- Born: 25 December 1937 Toshima, Tokyo, Japan
- Died: 9 February 2023 (aged 85) Minami-Nagasaki, Toshima, Tokyo, Japan
- Party: Liberal Democratic
- Education: Rikkyo University
- Profession: Businessman

Yukio Takano (Japanese: 高野之夫 Takano Yukio; 25 December 1937 – 9 February 2023) was a Japanese businessman and politician, member of the Liberal Democratic Party.

== Biography ==
He served in the Tokyo Metropolitan Assembly from 1989 to 1999. He was also mayor of Toshima from 1999 to 2023.

Takano died of COVID-19 in Tokyo on 9 February 2023, at the age of 85.
