= Hettie Ewing =

Hettie Lee Ewing
- Born: October 11, 1896; Cleburne, Texas
- Died: September 18, 1986 (aged 89); Mesquite, Texas
- Occupation: Missionary to Japan

Hettie Lee Ewing (October 11, 1896 – September 18, 1986) was a female missionary to Japan for the Churches of Christ. She helped establish permanent churches there in the first part of the twentieth century.

Hettie Lee Ewing was born on October 11, 1896, in Corpus Christi, Texas to Marcus Lafayette and Lenora Lee (Stringer) Ewing. Her early life was fairly unremarkable, Hettie Lee was single, living at home with her parents and teaching high school in Corpus Christi, Texas. This was all about to change though. One Sunday in May 1924, a letter from Lillie Delanzia Cypert, a female missionary in Japan, was read aloud to the congregation at the Furman Avenue Church of Christ during a service Hettie Lee was attending. In her letter, Cypert expressed her desire to find a woman her age who was willing to join her in her work in Japan. After the services, Hettie Lee met with the preacher, O. E. Phillips, to discuss this appeal and to seek more information. In August 1924 Hettie Lee Ewing made her intention to go to Japan public. Naturally, she faced an uphill battle: she was a young, single woman, she'd never been outside Nueces County by herself, her father was a widower whom she looked after and her entire extended family was opposed to it and she did not speak a word of Japanese. Regardless, she was determined and Hettie Lee set about raising money to pay for her trip. Hettie Lee spent a year in Los Angeles at the Westside Church of Christ under the tutelage of Hirosuke Ishiguro who taught her Japanese and helped her learn about the culture and language of Japan. She returned again to Nueces County to raise funds and after two years working toward her dream she was ready to begin the journey. When her father, Mark Ewing realized that Hettie Lee was determined to go, he did as any father would do: he told her he hoped her ship would sink.

On August 13, 1926, at the age of 30, Hettie Lee Ewing set sail for Japan on the Siberia Maru, a steamship that Japan had bought from Germany. She arrived in Yokohama, Japan on September 2, 1926, and was greeted by Lillie Cypert and J. M. McCaleb. Ewing moved into the home of Sarah Shepherd Andrews, who was away on furlough. Helped by two Japanese Christians, Ewing began a Sunday school and Bible classes in Okitsu. She learned the Japanese language and for many years, she taught classes to Japanese women and children and facilitated classes for men by other men. When Sarah Andrews returned to Japan in 1931, Ewing moved to the southeast part of Japan. Shizuoka City. During this time, the Japanese people were quite friendly and accepting of foreigners, but around 1937, she noticed a change. Rationing of all metal, from large items to pins and clips, was instituted. Blackout curtains were ordered to be placed on windows. By 1939, anti-American attitudes were openly expressed and she was followed by plainclothes policemen wherever she went; she and members of the church were interrogated frequently. She really loved the Japanese people and she was reluctant to return to America but she and the Japanese members of the church agreed that she was putting not only herself, but them, in danger by staying. Ewing returned to the Texas in 1941 and got a job with the U.S. Government in San Antonio and was there when the attack on Pearl Harbor occurred. Since she was fluent in the Japanese language, she transferred to Washington, D.C. and held several jobs there. Eventually, she was assigned to the War Relocation Authority to assist the Japanese/Americans who had been forcibly removed from their homes on the East Coast into the interior of America for the duration of the war. At the end of 1945 the camps were closed down and the people were asked to return to their homes. Most of them had no homes or jobs to return to and it was a huge task to relocate all of them. When her job was finished, she began trying to return to Japan so that she could assist the suffering Japanese Christians, who had sent her letters describing their plight. None of the Christians had died in the bombings, but all of them had lost their homes and all of their possessions and food and clothing was so scarce as to be non-existent. She ran into one roadblock after another to keep her from returning, but one of her greatest strengths was a dogged determination never to give up. She appealed to every possible authority, pulled every string at her disposal, and was finally able to arrive in Japan in 1947, where she lived in the corner of a storeroom with a cot for a bed. At first she had no food but the Japanese Christians shared everything they could from their meager means with her. She began writing letters to Christians in America asking for them to send boxes of food, medicine, and warm clothing and soon was able to help many, many people – Christians and non-Christians. She continued as a missionary to Japan until 1972. In 1974, her health was failing and she came back to Texas for good. She lived at Christian Care Center in Mesquite, Texas where she died on September, 18 1986.

== Works ==
- Ewing, Hettie Lee (1977). Another look at Japan: reminiscences of Hettie Lee Ewing. Dallas, Tex: Temple Pub. Co. WorldCat link
- Ewing, Hettie Lee, and Orlan Sawey (1974). She hath done what she could: the reminiscences of Hettie Lee Ewing. Dallas, Tex: Gospel Teachers Publications.WorldCat link

== See also ==
- Lillie Cypert - female missionary to Japan for the Churches of Christ
- Sarah Shepherd Andrews - female missionary to Japan for the Churches of Christ
