= Agariyashiki =

Area of Toshima, Tokyo

Coordinates: 35°43′35″N 139°42′19″E

Agariyashiki (上り屋敷) is a residential area in Toshima, Tokyo, Japan. It is located mainly alongliside the Seibu Ikebukuro railway line, in the 2-chōme and 3-chōme of the Nishi-Ikebukuro neighborhood, which belong to the districts of Takada and Nishisugamo respectively.

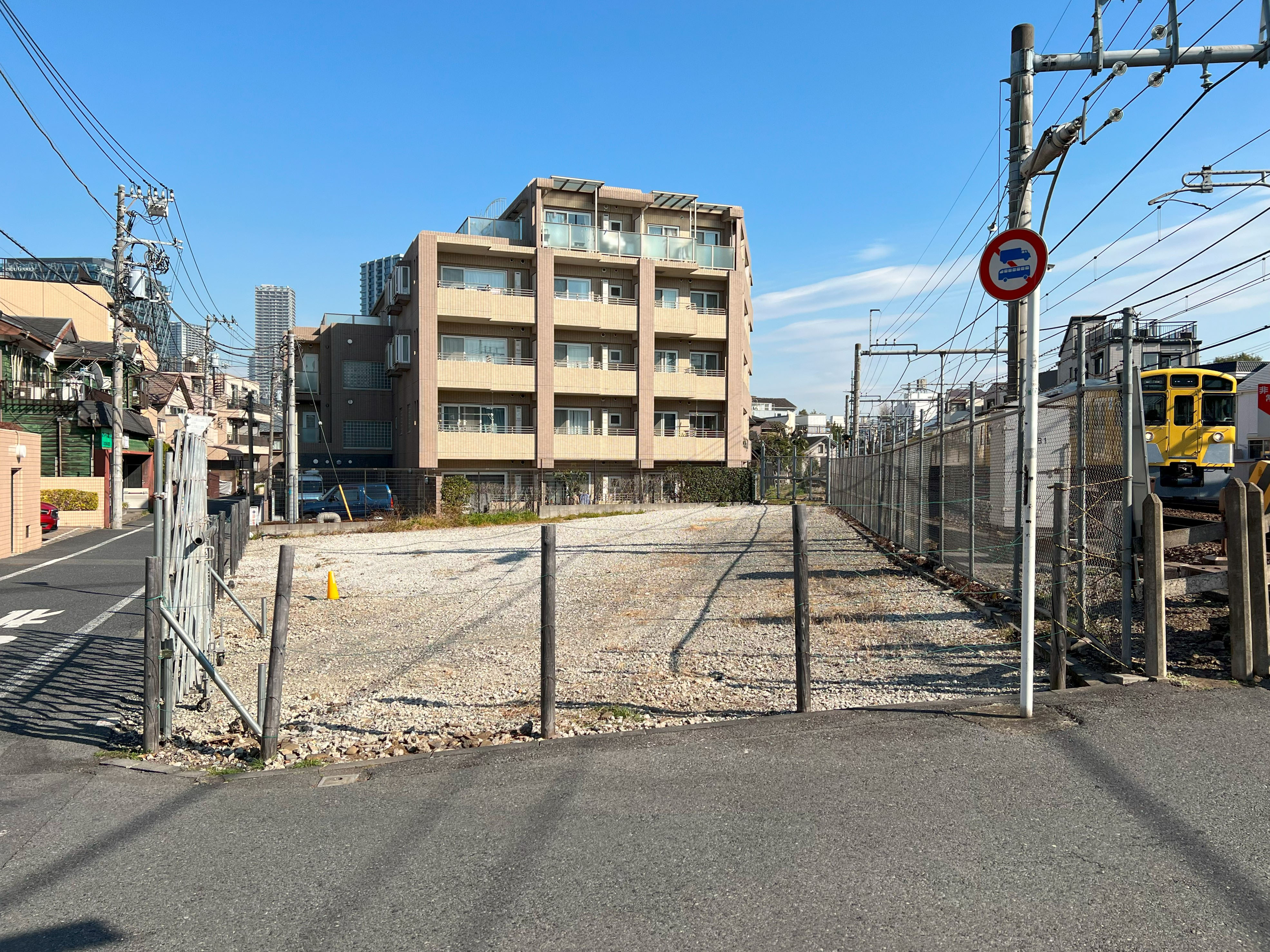
Site of the former railway station at Agariyashiki

Though the name is commonly used, it has never been used as an official district name. It is used in the names of Agariyashiki Park and the Agariyashiki town council, as well as the former Agariyashiki Station (on the Seibu Ikebukuro Line), closed in 1953.

The etymology of Agariyashiki is said to come from the Edo period, when it meant a rest area for hunters. The hunting grounds of the Tokugawa clan were located in what is now Otomeyama Park (in present-day Mejiro, Toshima, Shimo-Ochiai, and Shinjuku), and its shōguns are thought to have used the present-day Agariyashiki area as a resting place.
