= Cypert =

Cypert is a surname. Notable people with the surname include:

- Boyd Cypert (1889–1973), American baseball player, lawyer, and politician
- Cynthia Cypert, American actress
- Lillie Cypert (1890–1954), American missionary
- Chief Tahachee a.k.a. Jeff Davis "Tahchee" Cypert (1904–1978), American author, actor, stuntman
