= Sarah Shepherd Andrews =

American missionary

- Born: November 26, 1893; Dickson, TN
- Died: September 16, 1961 (aged 67); Japan
- Education: Dickson College
- Occupation: Missionary

Sarah Shepherd Andrews (November 26, 1893 – September 16, 1961) was an American missionary, who served in Japan from 1916 until her death in 1961. She was a key figure in bringing Christianity into the country.

== Biography ==
Andrews was born in Dickson, Tennessee. The work of J. M. McCaleb influenced her to work in Japan where she later established around eight Japanese congregations. Sometime after she was baptized at age 14, she wrote to McCaleb about coming to Japan and he gave her advice what schooling and training she would need to be successful. Andrews graduated from Dickson College, and took additional classes at other colleges before she went to Japan. Andrews landed in Tokyo in January 1916. Her first converts to Christianity were Oiki and her mother, both who later moved with her to Okitsu where they opened a kindergarten. Later, with donations from the United States, she helped build a church in Okitsu.

When World War II broke out, she was first put into a camp, then was imprisoned in her house. While she was a prisoner of war, she contracted tuberculosis. Andrews was rescued by an American soldier in 1945. She returned to the US in 1945 and in 1949 came back to Japan. After WWII, she opened a home for Japanese widows. She later said she did not take the option to flee Japan during the war as it would have led to the decline and destruction of the churches. She founded a church in Numazu in 1954, during its postwar redevelopment.

Andrews died from a stroke on September 17, 1961. Oiha, an orphan Andrews cared for, established her tomb, which is in Numazu.

== See also ==
- Lillie Cypert – female Christian missionary to Japan
- Hettie Ewing – female Christian missionary to Japan
