= Kishibojimmae Station =

Tram station in Tokyo, Japan

Coordinates: 35°43′14″N 139°42′54.6″E

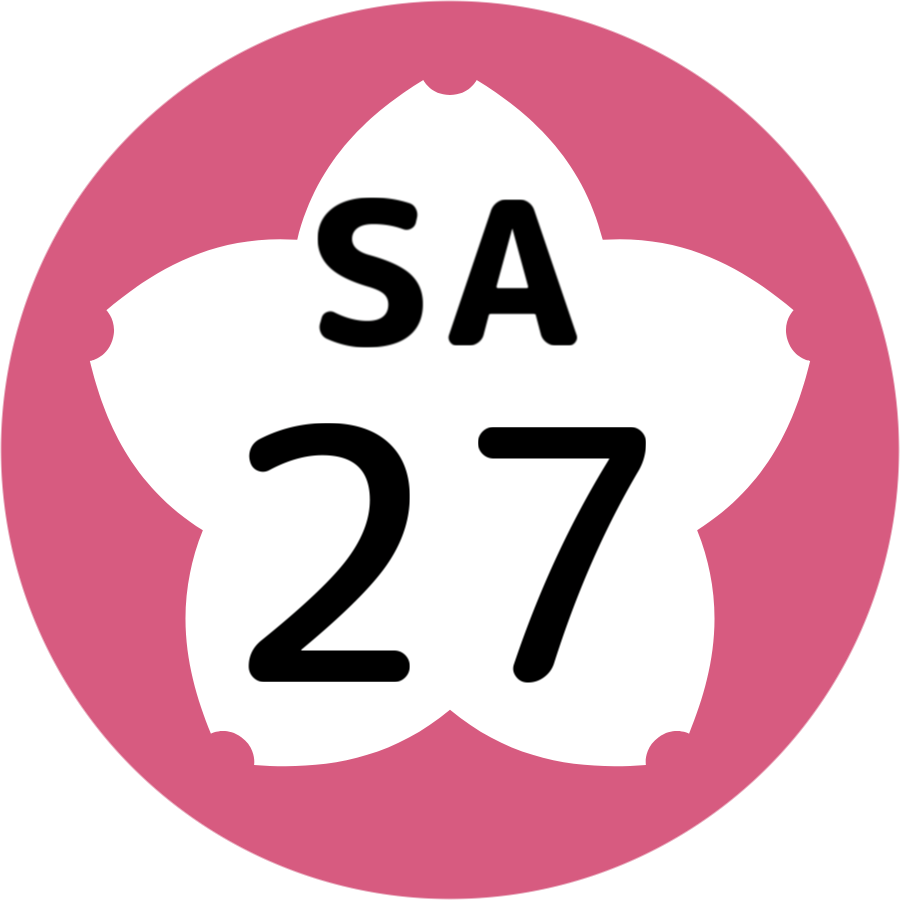
Kishibojimmae Station 鬼子母神前停留場

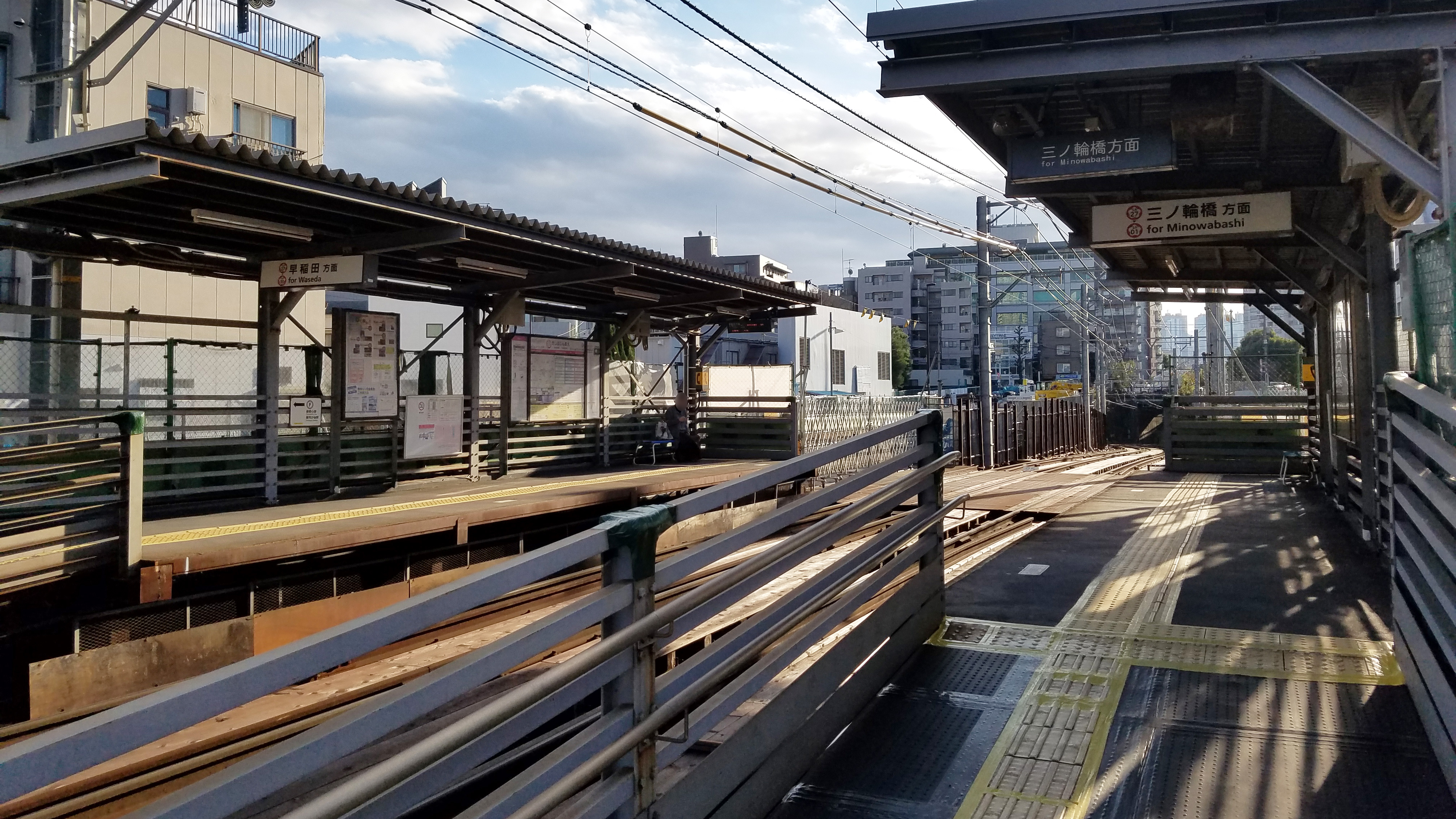
- Station platforms in December 2018

General information
- Location: Zoshigaya 2-chome, Toshima Ward, Tokyo; Japan
- Operator: Toei
- Line: Toden Arakawa Line
- Platforms: 2 side platforms
- Tracks: 2
- Connections: Zoshigaya

Construction
- Structure type: At grade

Other information
- Station code: SA27

History
- Opened: 25 December 1914; 111 years ago

Services
Preceding station	Toei	Following station
Gakushuinshita towards Waseda	Toden Arakawa Line	Toden-zoshigaya towards Minowabashi
Location
- Location within Special wards of Tokyo Location within Tokyo Bay and Bōsō Peninsula Location within Tokyo Location within Japan

Kishibojimmae Station (鬼子母神前停留場, Kishibojinmae-teiryūjō) is a station in the Tokyo Sakura Tram. It is located in Toshima, Tokyo. Tokyo Metro Zoshigaya Station on the Fukutoshin line is built directly underneath the station.

== Lines ==
- Tokyo Sakura Tram

== History ==
Kishibojimmae Station opened on 25 December 1914.
