= Nishi-waseda Station =

Metro station in Tokyo, Japan

Nishi-waseda Station 西早稲田駅

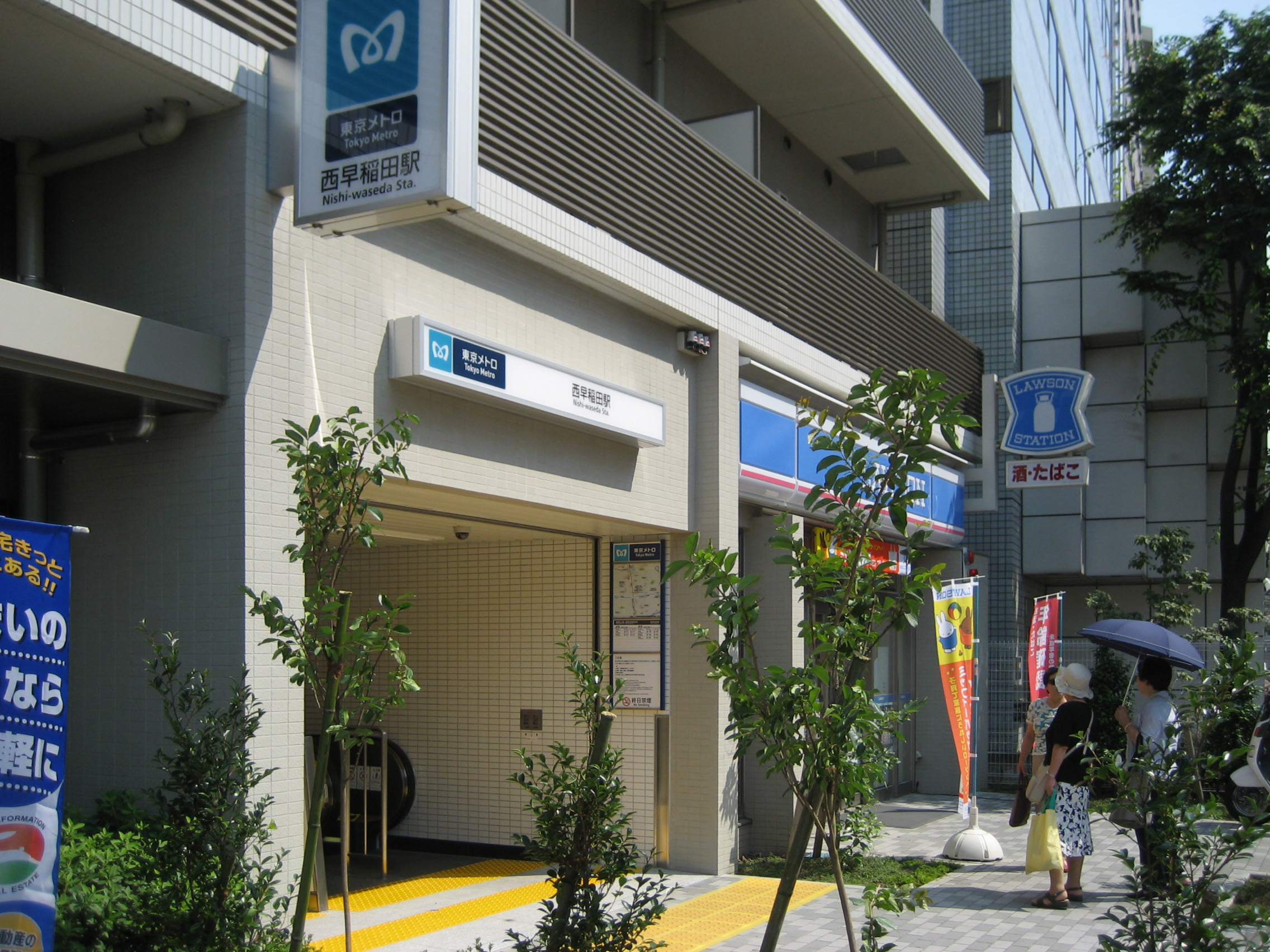
- Entrance No. 1 in July 2008

Japanese name
- Shinjitai: 西早稲田駅
- Kyūjitai: 西早稻田驛
- Hiragana: にしわせだえき

General information
- Location: 3-18-2 Toyama, Shinjuku City, Tokyo; Japan
- Coordinates: 35°42′26″N 139°42′33″E
- Operator: Tokyo Metro
- Line: Fukutoshin Line
- Distance: 14.6 km (9.1 mi) from Wakoshi
- Platforms: 1 island platform
- Tracks: 2

Construction
- Structure type: Underground

Other information
- Station code: F-11
- Website: Official website

History
- Opened: 14 June 2008; 18 years ago

Passengers
- FY2013: 32,380 daily

Services
Preceding station	Tokyo Metro	Following station
Higashi-shinjuku towards Shibuya	Fukutoshin Line Local	Zoshigaya towards Wakoshi
Location
- Location within Tokyo Yamanote Loop Location within Tokyo wards area Location within Japan

Nishi-waseda Station (Japanese: 西早稲田駅, Hepburn: Nishi-waseda-eki; lit. "West Waseda Station") is a subway station on the Tokyo Metro Fukutoshin Line, in Shinjuku, Tokyo, Japan, operated by the Tokyo subway operator Tokyo Metro. Its station number is F-11. The station opened on June 14, 2008. This station is directly connected to Nishiwaseda Campus of Waseda University in Shinjuku, Tokyo.

== Lines ==
Nishi-waseda Station is served by the Tokyo Metro Fukutoshin Line between Wakoshi and Shibuya, with many direct through-running services to and from the Seibu Ikebukuro Line and Tobu Tojo Line in the north, and the Tokyu Toyoko Line and Minatomirai Line in the south. The station lies 14.6 km from Wakoshi. It is also relatively close to Takadanobaba Station on the Tokyo Metro Tozai Line (located 550 meters to the northwest), although it is not officially recognized as a transfer station and there is no transfer corridor between the two stations.

== Station layout ==
The station has one underground island platform located on the third basement ("B3F") level, serving two tracks.

=== Platforms ===
1	Fukutoshin Line	for Shinjuku-sanchome and Shibuya; Tokyu Toyoko Line for Jiyugaoka and Yokohama; Minatomirai Line for Motomachi-Chukagai
2	Fukutoshin Line	for Ikebukuro and Wakoshi; Seibu Ikebukuro Line for Hannō; Tobu Tojo Line for Kawagoeshi and Shinrinkoen

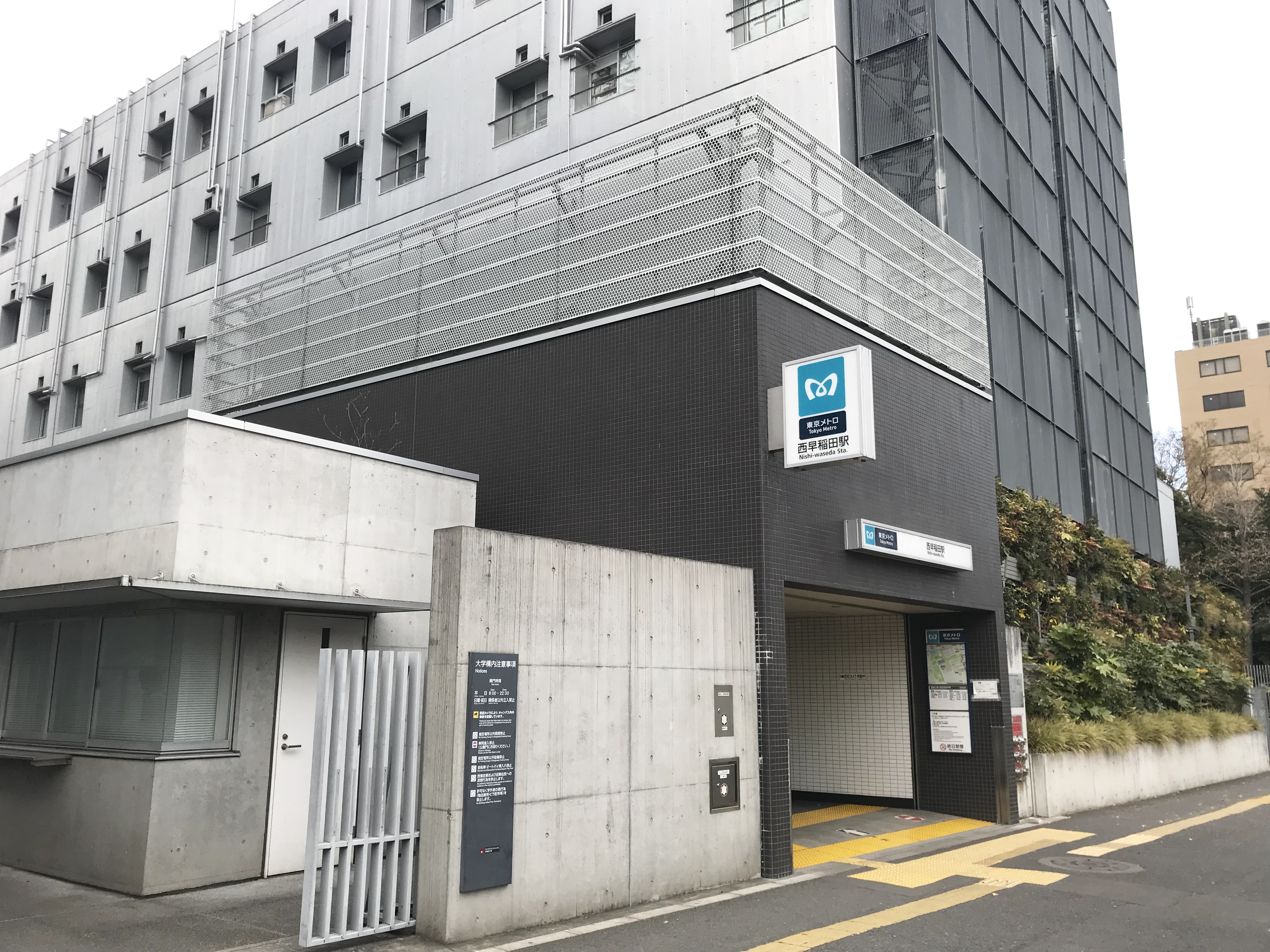
Entrance No. 3 in January 2019

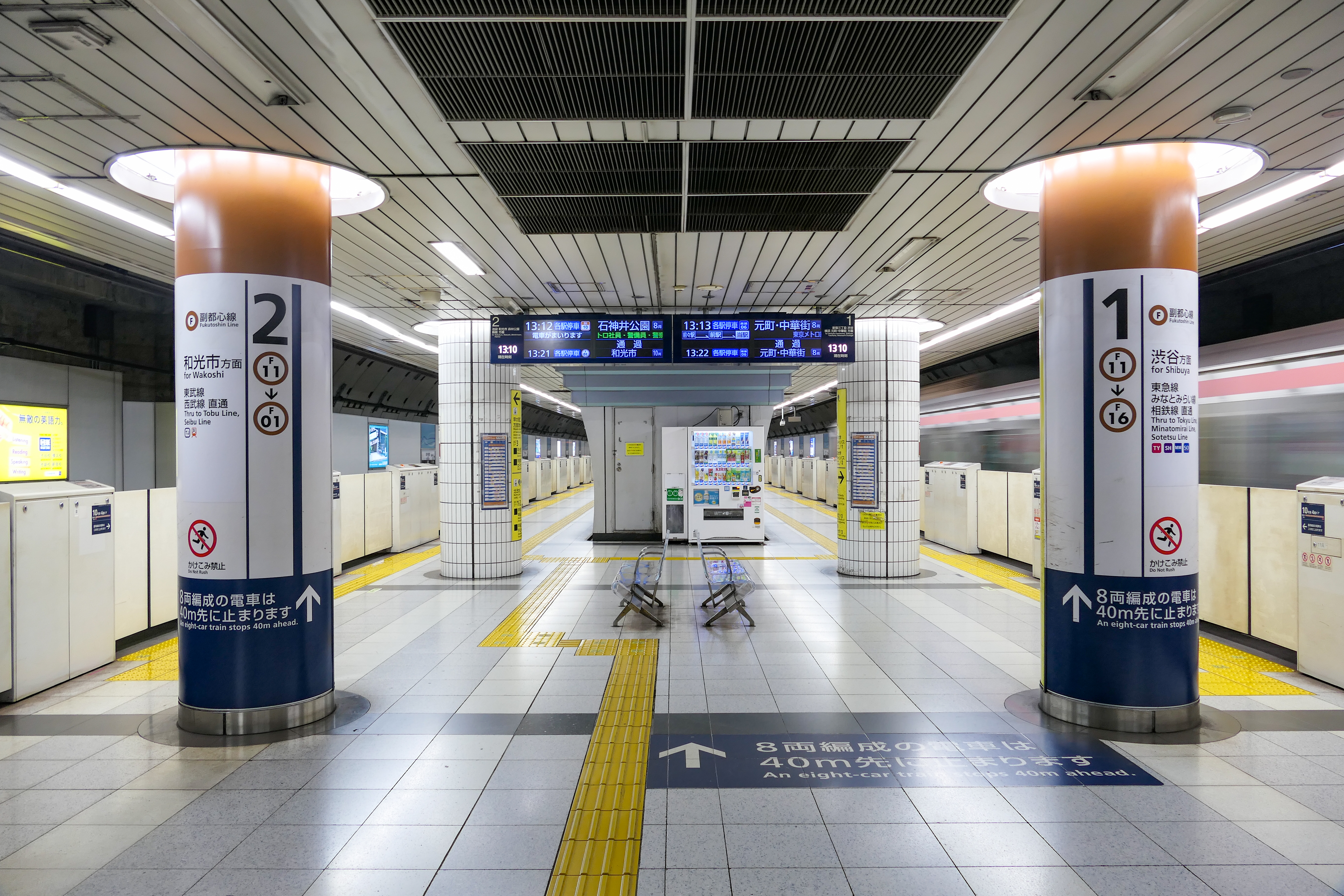
The platforms in August 2023

== History ==
The station opened on 14 June 2008 with the opening of the Fukutoshin Line from Ikebukuro to Shibuya.

== Passenger statistics ==
In fiscal 2013, the station was the 105th-busiest on the Tokyo Metro network with an average of 32,380 passengers daily. The passenger statistics for previous years are as shown below.

Fiscal year	Daily average
2011	26,535
2012	28,326
2013	32,380

== Surrounding area ==
- Toyama area
- Ōkubo area
- Totsuka (Waseda) and Takadanobaba area
- Toyama Park
- Shinjuku Sports Center
- Gakushuin Women's College, a private school
- Gakushuin Girls' Junior and Senior High School, a private school
- Toyama High School, a public school
- Nishi-Waseda Junior High School, a public school
- Waseda University School of Science and Engineering, Nishi-Waseda Campus in Ōkubo

== See also ==
- List of railway stations in Japan
