= Lillie Cypert =

American missionary in Japan (1890-1954)

Lillie Delenzia Cypert
- Born: May 27, 1890; Oak Flats, Arkansas
- Died: August 13, 1954 (aged 64); Porterville, California
- Occupation: Missionary to Japan
- Years active: 1917-1943

Lillie Delenzia Cypert (May 27, 1890 - August 13, 1954) served as an American missionary in Japan from October 1917 to December 1943 when she returned to the United States as part of a civilian exchange. Along with Sarah Shepherd Andrews and Hettie Lee Ewing, other single missionaries, she contributed greatly to the setting up of permanent Japanese congregations of the Churches of Christ.

== Early life ==
Lillie Cypert was the daughter of Eli Newton Cypert and Euphamia Cable. Her father died when Lillie was four and her mother remarried James Franklin Dyer. Altogether Cypert had ten siblings, six from her mother’s second marriage. After attending Freed-Hardeman College (now Freed-Hardeman University) in Henderson, Tennessee, Cypert returned to Searcy County, Arkansas, to teach school.

== Life as a missionary ==
Cypert was introduced to missionary work and Japan in particular while at Freed-Hardeman. In the fall of 2016 she contacted J.M McCaleb about her desire to volunteer as a missionary in Japan. Cypert’s physician reported favorably on her health, an important quality for a missionary. Support of fifty dollars a month was sought from churches in Tennessee, Cypert sailed for Japan on October 5, 1917, arriving on October 25, 1917.

Lillie Cypert joined Sarah Shepherd Andrews in Tokyo, teaching in a boys’ boarding school run by J. M. McCaleb. They also taught Bible classes and English classes. Cypert served as the matron of a girls’ school from its opening in Dec. 1918 until it closed in 1920.

According to reports in the publication Word and Work Cypert struggled with finances, particularly because her sponsoring congregation changed a number of times, including several in Texas. During a furlough home in 1922, she taught at the Abilene Mexican Mission. Missionaries returned home on furloughs every five to seven years. In addition to recuperating their health, missionaries were expected to recruit additional missionaries and to raise funds by sharing their experience in talks at churches and college campuses.

Returning to Japan in December 1923, Lillie Cypert was in charge of the Zoshigaya Sunday School, and continued to teach Bible, English cooking, and sewing classes. She opened a kindergarten on Sept. 15, 1924. Early in 1925 opened a girls’ boarding school in Zoshigaya which she later turned over to McCaleb. In 1927 Cypert began a children’s Bible school and ladies Bible class in Kichijoji, eight miles away. In April 1929 she opened a kindergarten there. This kindergarten was so successful a new wing was added in 1935.

Following a 1928 visit to Japan, George Pepperdine began a “mission extension fund” which provided Cypert with forty-five dollars a month. Cypert spent Oct. 28, 1930 through the spring of 1932 visiting her supporting churches, trying to raise funds during the difficult days of the Great Depression. Her visits to churches in Denton, Texas, are recorded in the local paper.

In 1938 and 1939, Cypert had health issues, including trachoma, a probably stroke, high blood pressure, and teeth problems.

== Return to the United States ==
Lille Cypert was one of four single Restoration Movement female missionaries who had not left Japan before the start of World War II; all of the men and their families had left. Cypert was taken to the Shinjuku prisoner of war camp in Tokyo. She was returned to the United States as part of an exchange of civilians, leaving Japan on Sept. 13, 1943 and arriving in New York on December 1, 1943. During the remainder of the war she worked as a Japanese interpreter in an Arkansas relocation camp. Cypert next moved to Los Angeles but health issues caused her to join her sister in Porterville, California in 1950 where she died on August 13, 1954.

== See also ==
- Hettie Ewing - female missionary to Japan for the Churches of Christ
- Sarah Shepherd Andrews - female missionary to Japan for the Churches of Christ
