= Sugamo =

Neighborhood in Toshima, Tokyo

Coordinates: 35°44′20″N 139°43′52″E

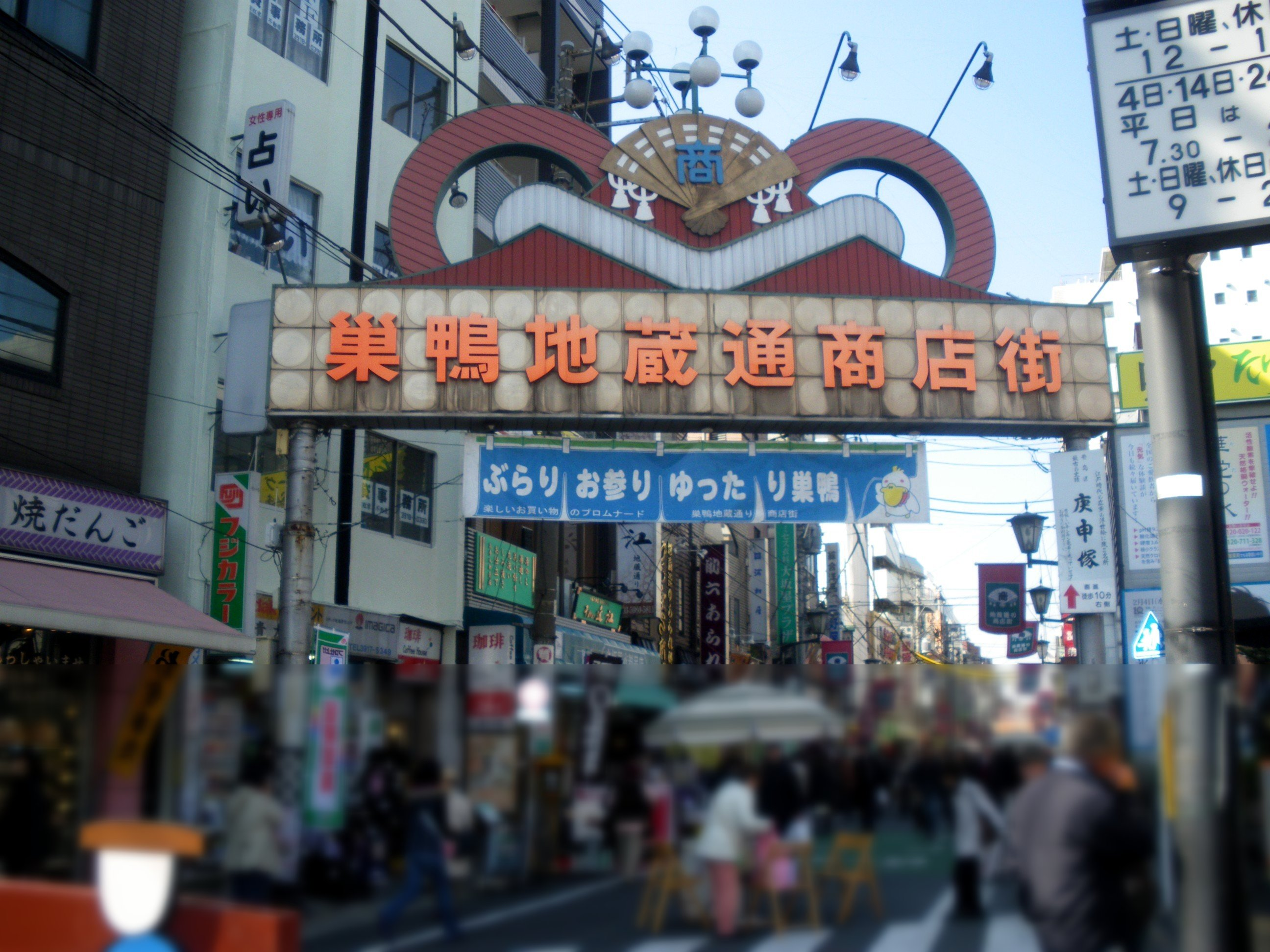
Sugamo Jizō-dōri

Sugamo (巣鴨) is a neighborhood in Toshima, Tokyo, Japan. It is home to Jizō-dōri (地蔵通り), a shopping street popular among the older generation, earning it the nickname "Granny's Harajuku." It lies at the crossing point of the JR Yamanote Line and National Route 17.

Available public transportation to Sugamo are JR Yamanote Line and Toei Mita Line. There is also Koshinzuka station of Toden Arakawa Line in the middle of Jizō-dōri (地蔵通り) shopping street.

Tokugawa Yoshinobu, the last shogun of the Tokugawa Shogunate, was living in Sugamo in 1897.

== Education ==
Public elementary and junior high schools are operated by the Toshima Ward Board of Education.

Sugamo is served by the attendance zones of multiple elementary schools:

- Gyoko Elementary School (仰高小学校) - 2-chome, most of 1-chome and 3-chome
- Sugamo Elementary School (巣鴨小学校) - 1-chome 34-49-ban
- Seiwa Elementary School (清和小学校) - 3-chome 5-18 ban, 4-chome 1-26 and 33-ban and most of 28, 29, and 32-ban
- Asahi Elementary School (朝日小学校) - 5-chome, and 4-chome 27, 30-31, and 34-44-ban, and parts of 28, 29, and 32-ban

The following junior high schools serve portions of Sugamo:

- Komagome (駒込中学校) - 2-chome, most of 1-chome and 3-chome
- Sugamo North (Sugamo Kita) (巣鴨北中学校) - All of 4 and 5-chome, and 3-chome 5-18-ban
- West Sugamo (Nishi Sugamo) (西巣鴨中学校) - 1-chome 34-49-ban

== See also ==
- Sugamo Prison
- Sugamo Station
- Tokugawa Yoshinobu
