= Kami-ikebukuro =

Kami-ikebukuro (上池袋) is a neighborhood in Toshima, Tokyo, Japan. It is located among JR Ikebukuro, Ōtsuka, and Itabashi Stations and spread along Meiji Avenue.

Kami-ikebukuro borders Ikebukuro-honchō, Takinogawa (in Kita), and Nishi-sugamo in the north, and Kita-Ōtsuka and Higashi-ikebukuro in the south. Most of it is a residential area that is formed after World War 2, and some parts along Meiji Avenue are commercial.

== Geography ==
The south end of the area is edge of Ikebukuro tableland with an altitude of about 30 meters. Conversely, the north side of the area faces the Yabata River, with relatively low altitude of about 20 meters.

== History ==
- Kamakura period: Kamakura-kaido that runs through this area, had been established by the Kamakura shogunate.
- Before the Edo period: This area is believed to have been mostly forest, woods, with some farms, because Kami-ikebukuro was outside of the Edo metropolitan area from which the Tokugawa shogunate had ruled.

== Transportation ==
- Roads
  - Meiji Avenue
  - Ganken street
  - Kawagoe Road
  - Route 5 (Shuto Expressway) (Takebashi Junction- Bijogi Junction)
- Railways
  - JR Yamanote Line
  - JR Akabane Line (Saikyō Line)
  - Tōbu Tōjō Line
- Buses

Bus services run on Meiji-dori Avenue.

  - Services
    - KUSA63 (草63) service (To Asakusa via Ōji Station)
    - KUSA64 (草64) service (To Asakusa via Nishi-Nippori Station)
    - OH40 (王40) service (To Ōji Station, Nishiarai Station)
  - Bus stops
    - Kami-ikebukuro 1-chōme
    - Kami-ikebukuro 3-chōme
    - Kami-ikebukuro 4-chōme

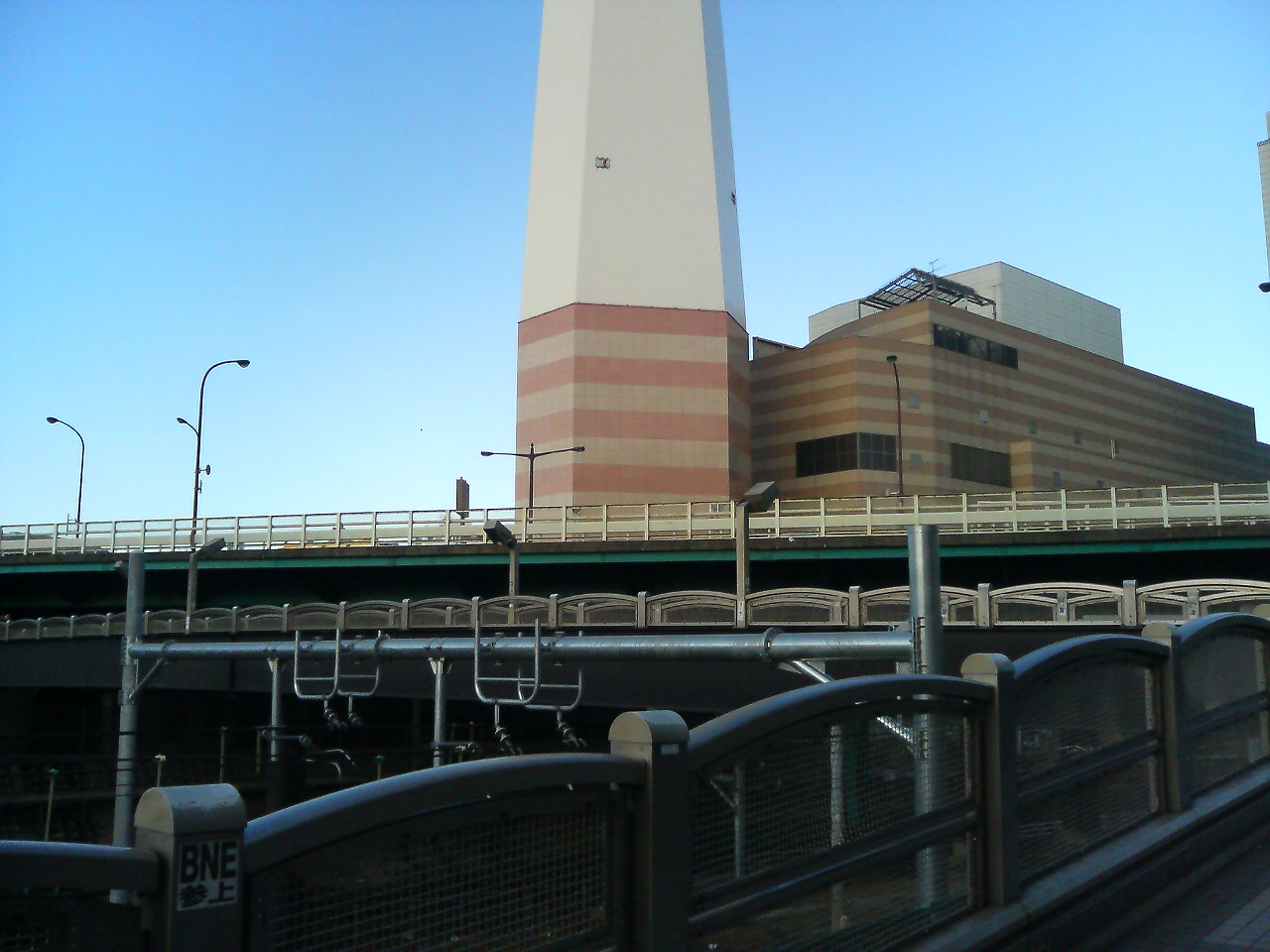
Ikebukuro-Ōhashi overpass (January, 2007)

== Significant facilities ==
- Itabashi Station
- Ikebukuro Community Center
- Ikebukuro Sports Center
- APA Hotel Tokyo Itabashi

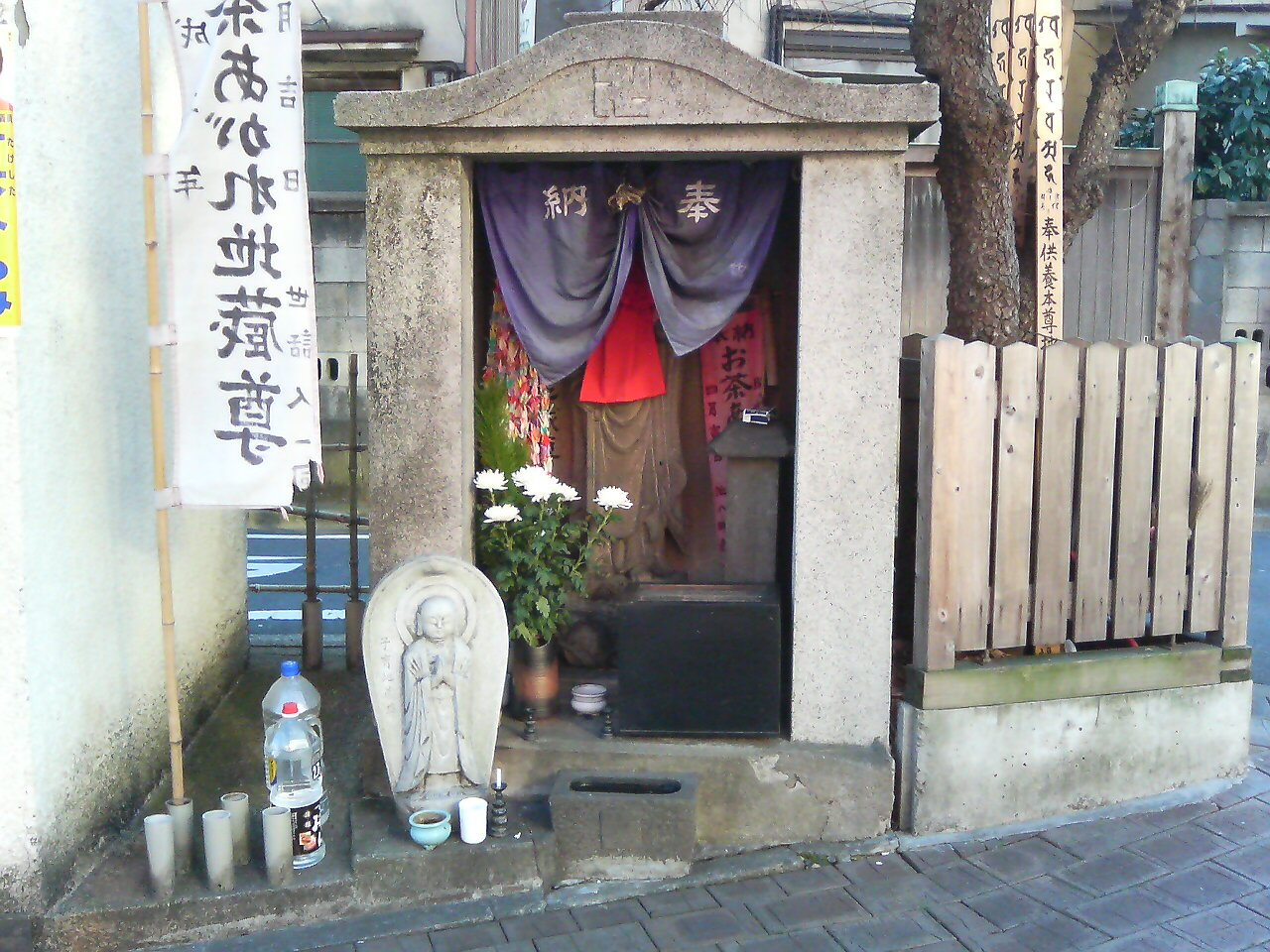
Ocha-agare-Jizō (January, 2007)

== Show places ==
- Ocha-agare-jizō
- Ikebukuro-Ōhashi overpass

== Parks ==
- Kami-ikebukuro Central Park
- Miyanaka Park
- Kami-ikebukuro Park
- Kami-ikebukuro Sakura (cherry blossom) Park
- Horinouchi Park

== Shops ==
- Supermarkets
  - Sundaymart supermarket
- Convenience stores
  - Seven-Eleven (2-chōme, 3-chōme)
  - Family Mart (3-chōme, 4-chōme)
  - Lawson (1-chōme)
  - Ministop( 1-chōme, 4-chōme)
  - 99 Shop
  - Y Shop Homareya

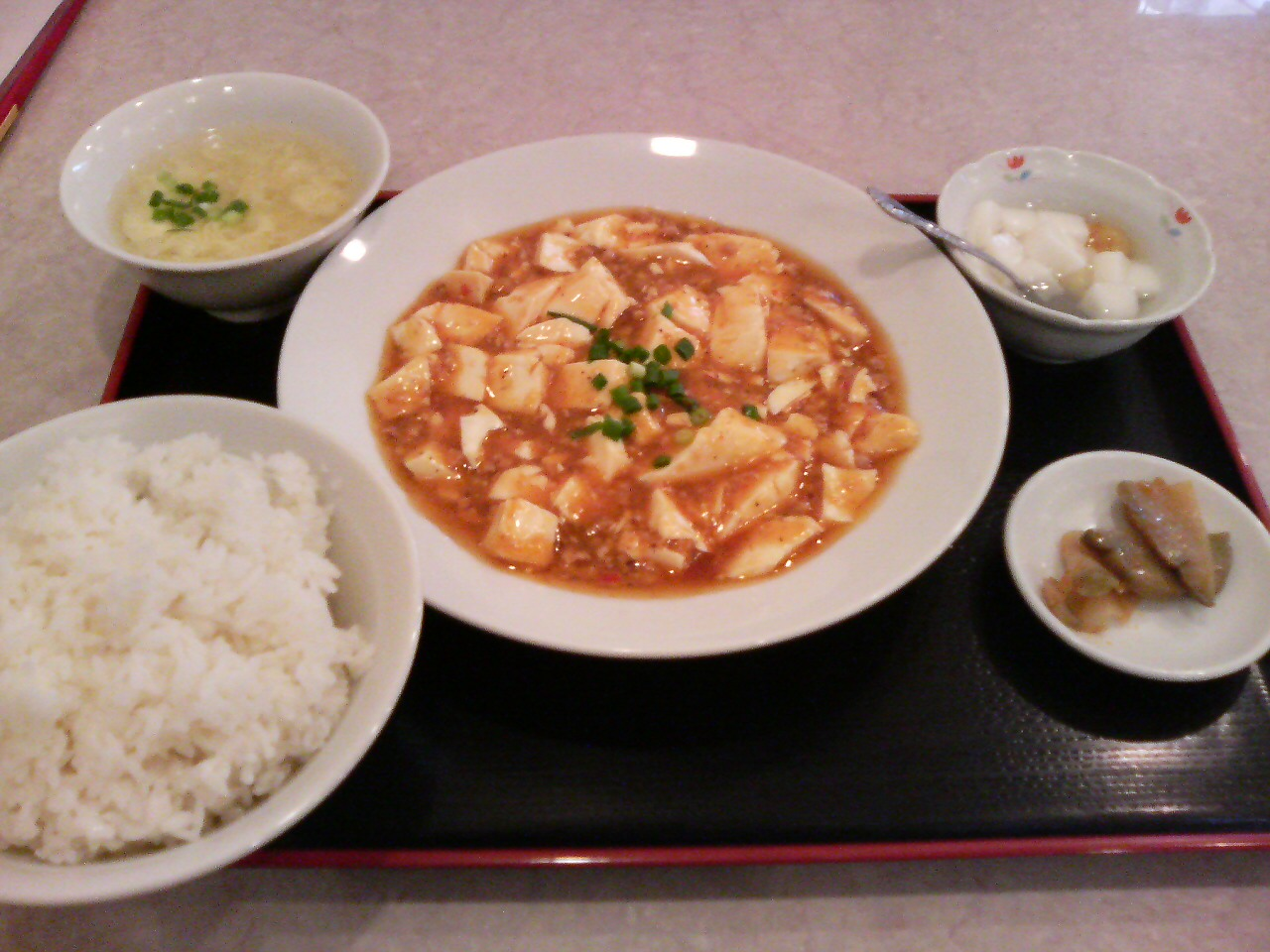
Chinese lunch in Daifuku (600 yen)(January, 2007)

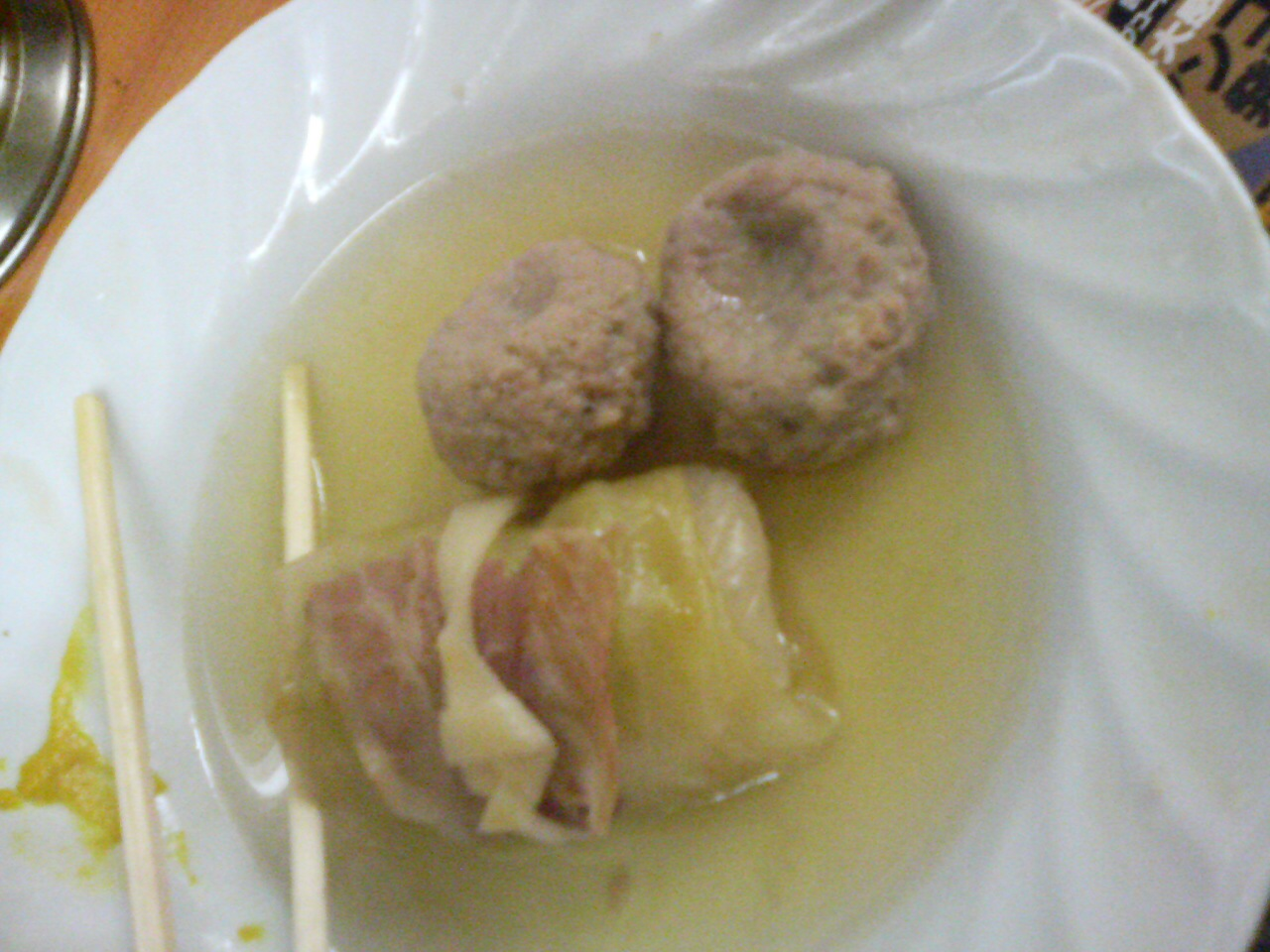
Oden at Wakamatsu (Fish ball 90 yen; meatball wrapped with cabbage 100 yen)(January, 2007)

== Restaurants ==
- Kami-ikebukuro Chūkarō (Chinese)
- Daifuku (Chinese)
- Cafe Tablier (French)
- Wakamatsu (Japanese, oden)

== Financial institutions ==
- Nihon-yūsei-kōsha (Japan Post)

== Educational facilities ==
- Sugamo Gakuen (high school/junior high school)
- Ikebukuro-daiichi Primary School
