= Minami-Nagasaki =

Minami-Nagasaki 南長崎
- District
- Location of Minami-Nagasaki within Tokyo
- Coordinates: 35°43′43.77″N 139°40′58.75″E
- Country: Japan
- Region: Kantō
- Prefecture: Tokyo
- Ward: Toshima

Population (December 1, 2017)
  - Total: 20,219
- Time zone: UTC+9 (JST)
- Zip code: 171-0052
- Area code: 03

Minami-Nagasaki (南長崎) is a district of Toshima, Tokyo, Japan. The current administrative place names are Minaminagasaki 1-chome and Minami-Nagasaki 6-chome.
