= Zoshigaya Station =

Metro station in Tokyo, Japan

Coordinates: 35°43′14″N 139°42′55″E

Zoshigaya Station 雑司が谷駅

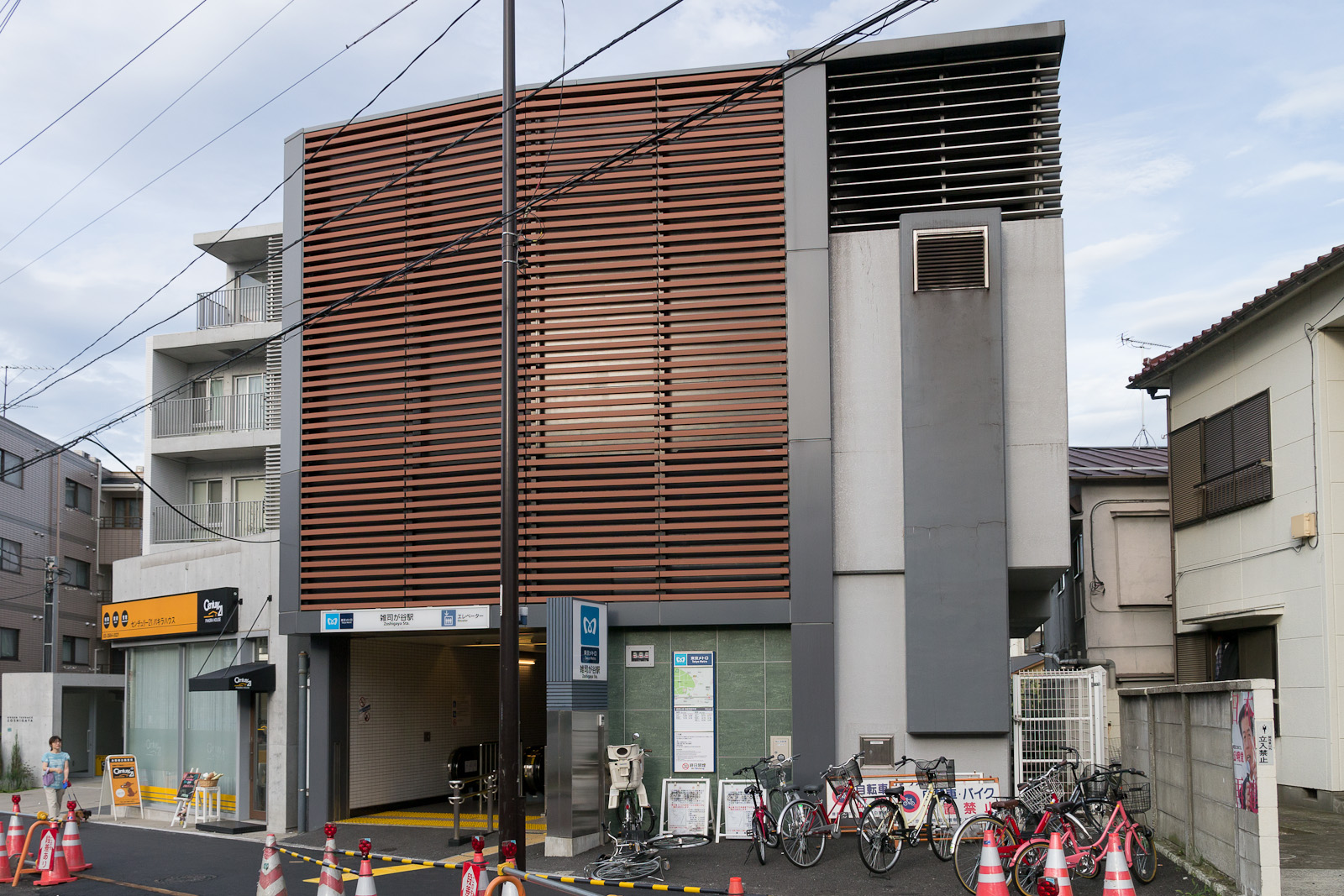
- Entrance No. 1 in July 2012

General information
- Location: 2-6-1 Zoshigaya, Toshima-ku, Tokyo 171-0032; Japan
- Operator: Tokyo Metro
- Line: Fukutoshin Line
- Distance: 13.1 km (8.1 mi) from Wakoshi
- Platforms: 1 island platform
- Tracks: 2
- Connections: Kishibojimmae (Toden Arakawa Line)

Construction
- Structure type: Underground

Other information
- Station code: F-10
- Website: www.tokyometro.jp/rosen/eki/zoshigaya/index.html

History
- Opened: 14 June 2008; 18 years ago

Passengers
- FY2015: 17,437 daily

Services
Preceding station	Tokyo Metro	Following station
Nishi-waseda towards Shibuya	Fukutoshin Line Local	Ikebukuro towards Wakoshi
Location
- Location within Tokyo Yamanote Loop Location within Tokyo wards area Location within Japan

Zoshigaya Station (雑司が谷駅, Zōshigaya-eki) is a subway station on the Tokyo Metro Fukutoshin Line in Toshima, Tokyo, Japan, operated by the Tokyo subway operator Tokyo Metro. It is numbered "F-10".

== Lines ==
Zoshigaya Station is served by the Tokyo Metro Fukutoshin Line between Wakoshi and Shibuya, with many direct through-running services to and from the Seibu Ikebukuro Line and Tobu Tojo Line in the north, and the Tokyu Toyoko Line and Minatomirai Line in the south.

The station is adjacent to Kishibojimmae Station on the Toden Arakawa Line. To prevent confusion, the former Zōshigaya Station on the Arakawa Line was renamed Toden-Zōshigaya when the Fukutoshin Line opened in 2008.

== Station layout ==
The station consists of one underground island platform located on the fourth basement ("4BF") level, serving two tracks.

=== Platforms ===
1	Fukutoshin Line	for Shinjuku-sanchome and Shibuya; Tokyu Toyoko Line for Jiyugaoka and Yokohama; Minatomirai Line for Motomachi-Chukagai
2	Fukutoshin Line	for Ikebukuro and Wakoshi; Seibu Ikebukuro Line for Hannō; Tobu Tojo Line for Kawagoeshi and Shinrinkoen

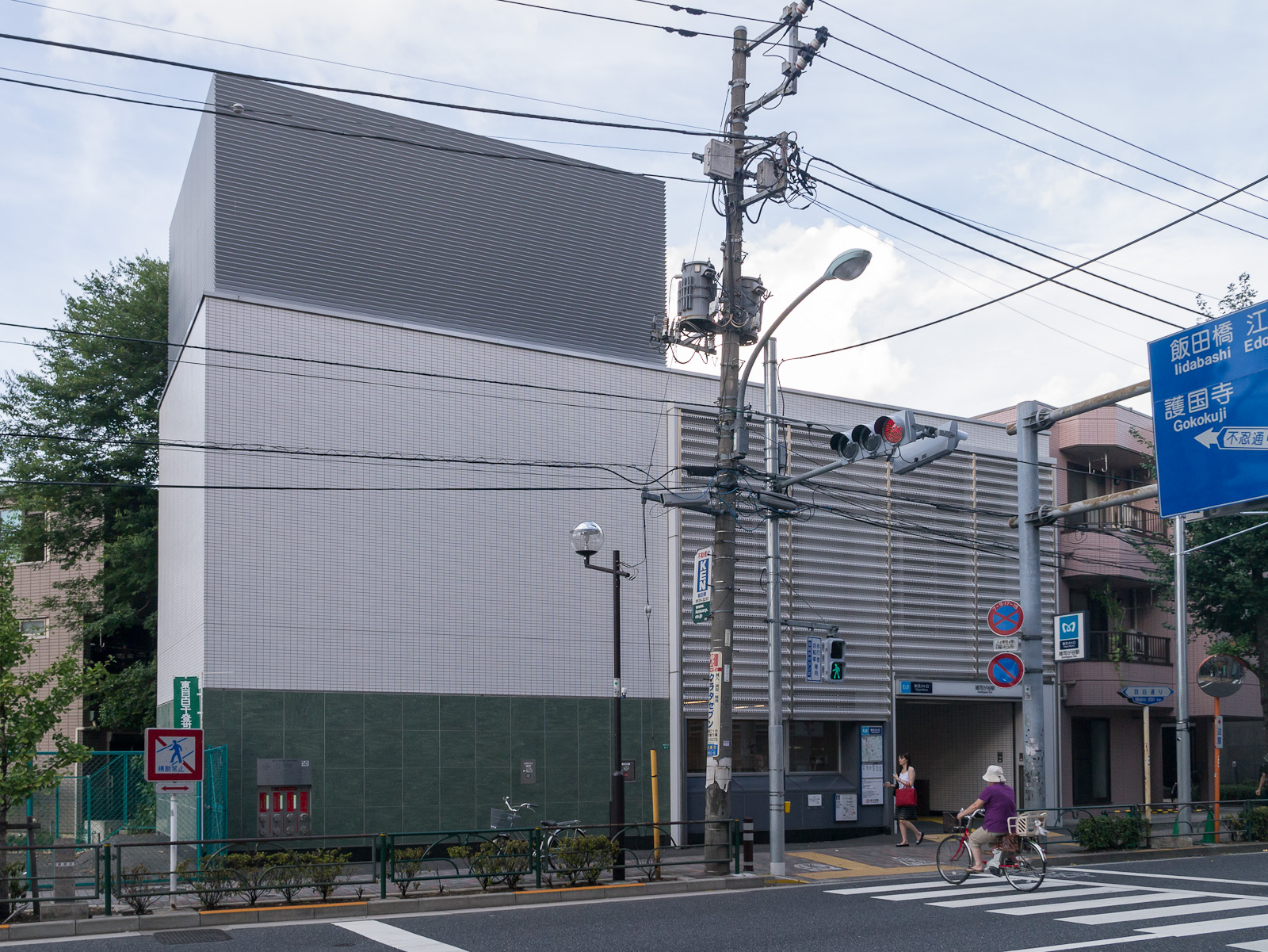
Entrance No. 3 in September 2012

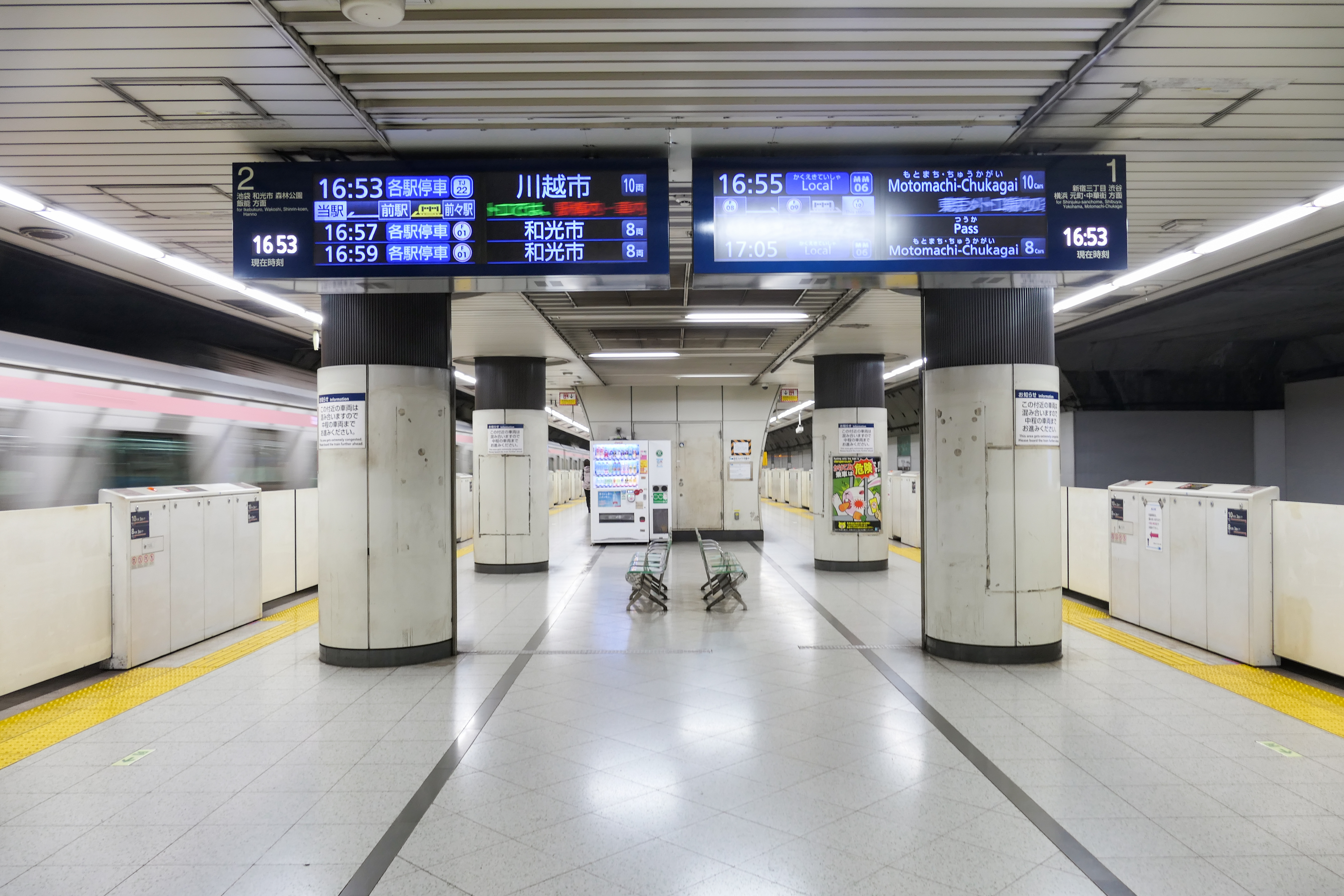
The platform in November 2023

== History ==
The station opened on 14 June 2008 with the opening of the Fukutoshin Line from Ikebukuro to Shibuya.

== Passenger statistics ==
In fiscal 2015, the station was used by an average of 17,437 passengers daily, making it the least used station on the Fukutoshin Line and the 126th-busiest on the Tokyo Metro network. The passenger statistics for previous years are as shown below.

Fiscal year	Daily average
2010	12,394
2011	12,799
2012	13,638
2013	15,873
2014	16,688
2015	17,437

== Surrounding area ==
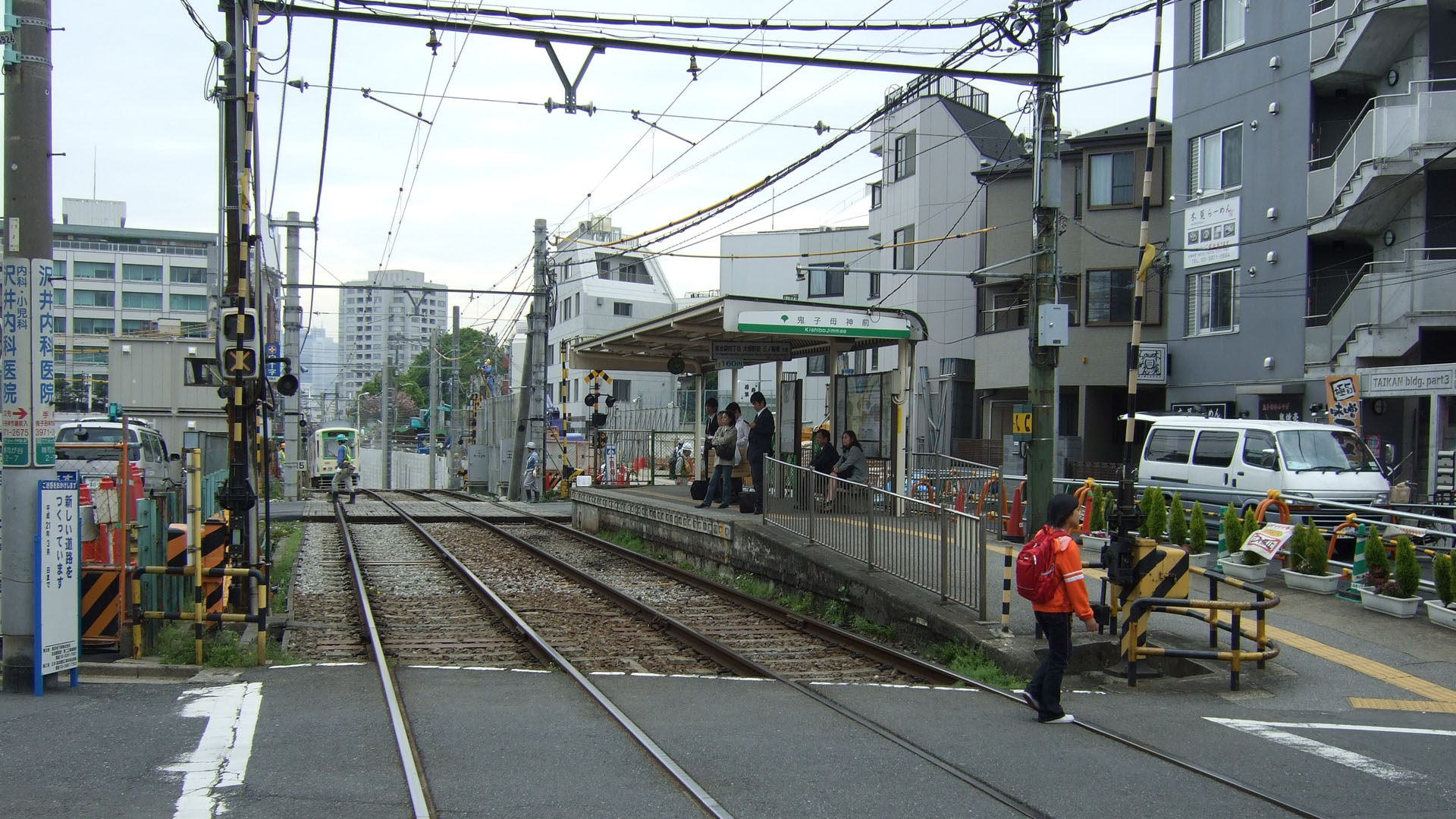
Kishibojimmae tram stop in April 2008

- Kishibojimmae Station on the Toden Arakawa Line

== See also ==
- List of railway stations in Japan
