= Toden-zōshigaya Station =

Tram station in Tokyo, Japan

Coordinates: 35.7242°N 139.7180°E

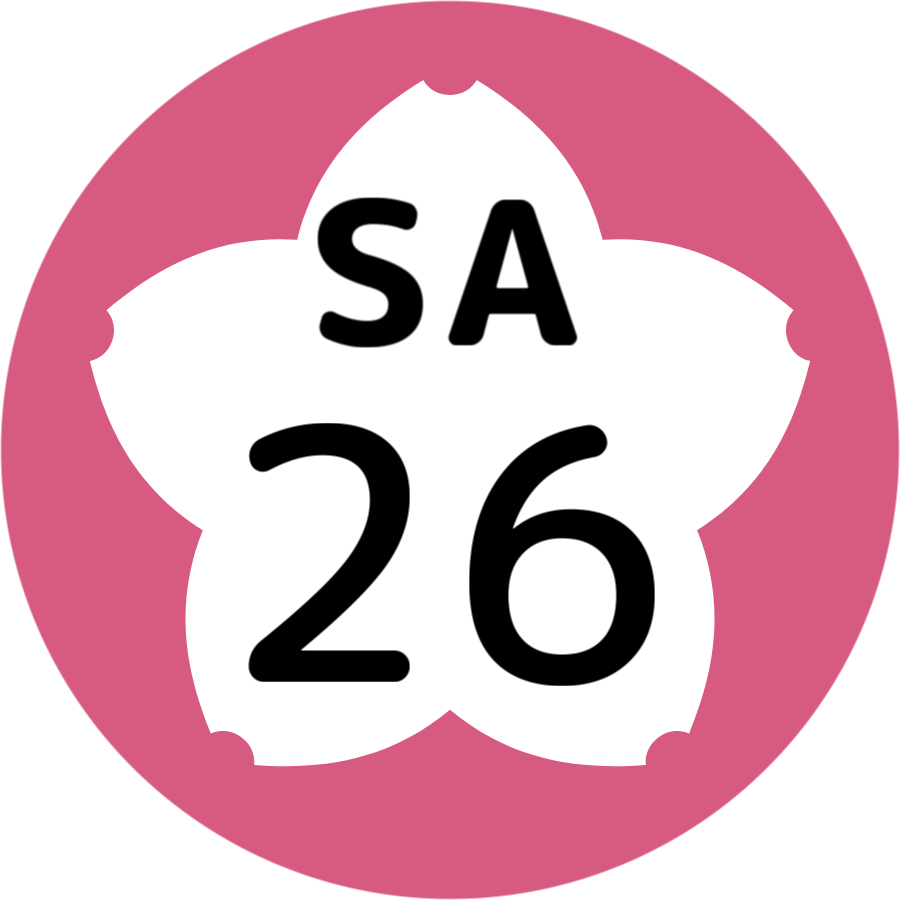
Toden-zōshigaya Station 都電雑司ヶ谷停留場

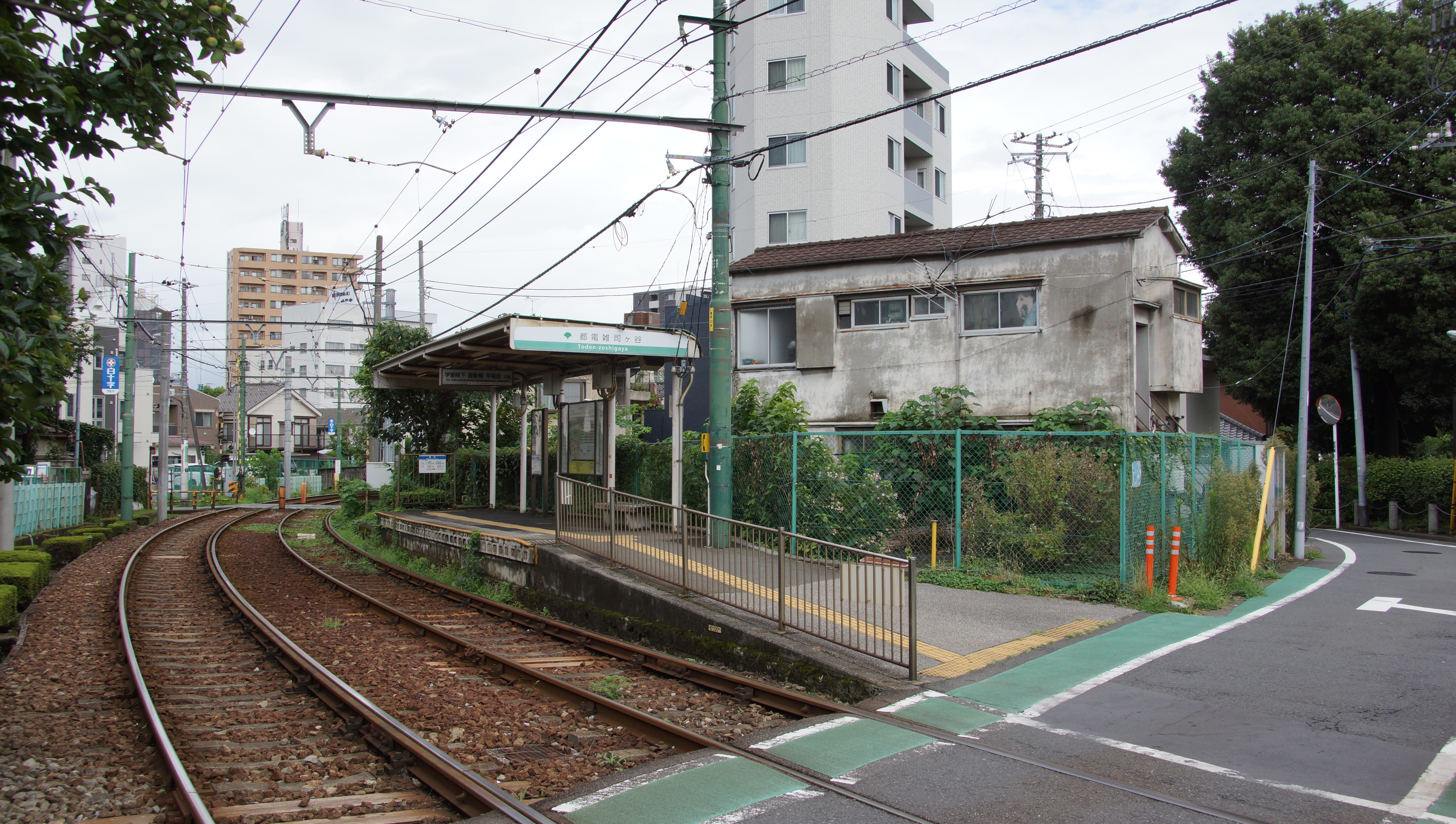
- The Waseda-bound platform in August 2016

General information
- Location: 3-chome, Minami-ikebukuro, Toshima Ward, Tokyo 171-0022; Japan
- Operator: Toei
- Line: Toden Arakawa Line
- Distance: 10.2 km (6.3 mi) from Minowabashi
- Platforms: 2 side platforms
- Tracks: 2

Construction
- Structure type: At grade

Other information
- Website: www.kotsu.metro.tokyo.jp/toden/stations/zoshigaya/

History
- Opened: 30 March 1925; 101 years ago
- Former names: Zoshigaya (until June 2008)

Services
Preceding station	Toei	Following station
Kishibojimmae towards Waseda	Toden Arakawa Line	Higashi-ikebukuro-yonchome towards Minowabashi
Location
- Location within Special wards of Tokyo Location within Tokyo Bay and Bōsō Peninsula Location within Tokyo Location within Japan

Toden-zōshigaya Station (都電雑司ヶ谷停留場, Toden-zōshigaya-teiryūjō) is a tram stop on the Tokyo Sakura Tram in Toshima, Tokyo, Japan, operated by Tokyo Metropolitan Bureau of Transportation (Toei).

== Lines ==
Toden-zōshigaya Station is served by the 12.2 km Tokyo Sakura Tram from Minowabashi to Waseda, and is 10.2 km from Minowabashi.

== Station layout ==
The station has two side platforms located on either side of a level crossing.

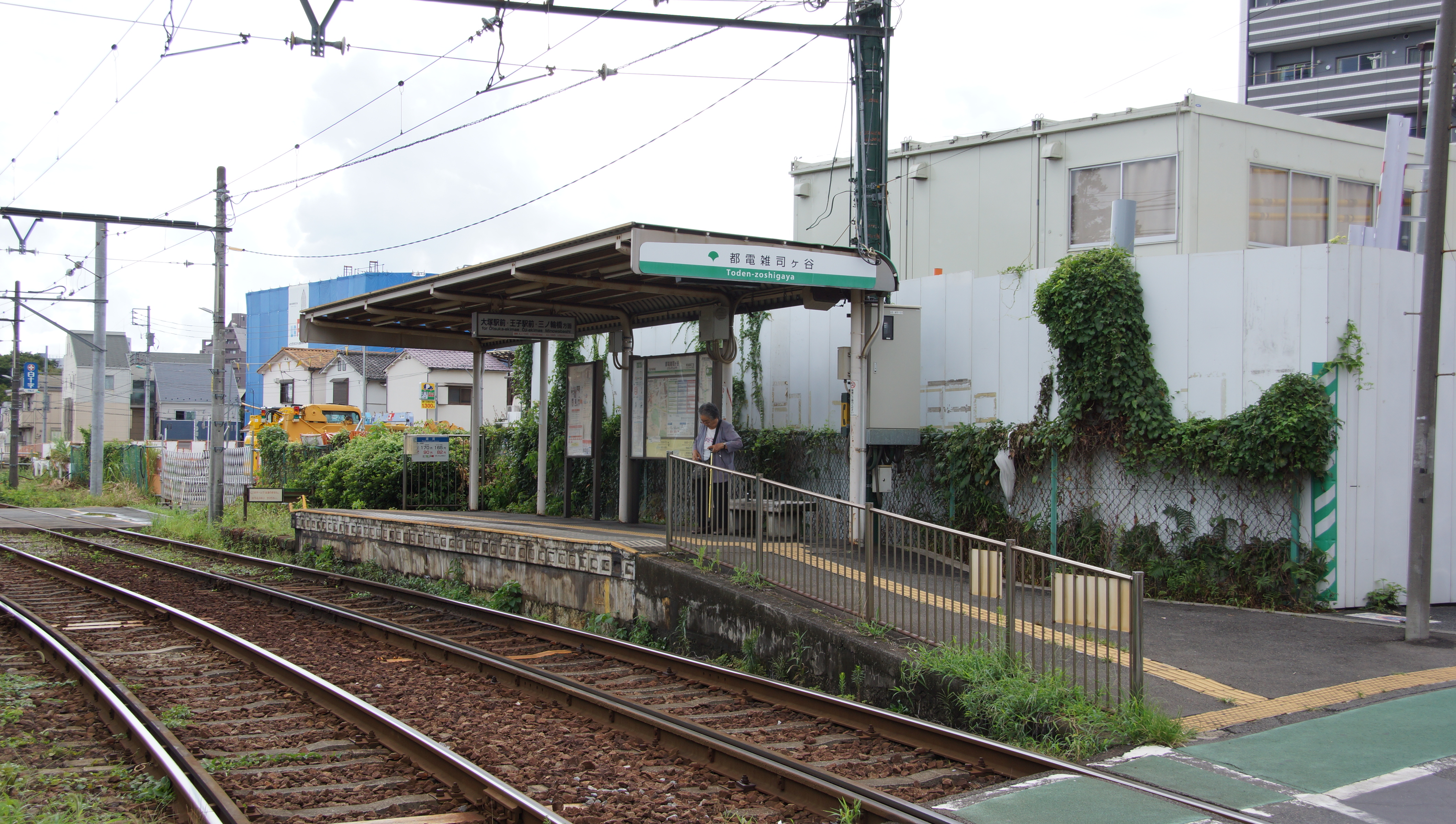
The Minowabashi-bound platform in August 2016

== History ==
The station opened on 12 November 1925, originally named Zoshigaya Station (雑司ヶ谷停留場). It was renamed Toden-zoshigaya on 14 June 2008 to avoid confusion with Zoshigaya Station which opened on the Tokyo Metro Fukutoshin Line subway on the same day.

== Surrounding area ==
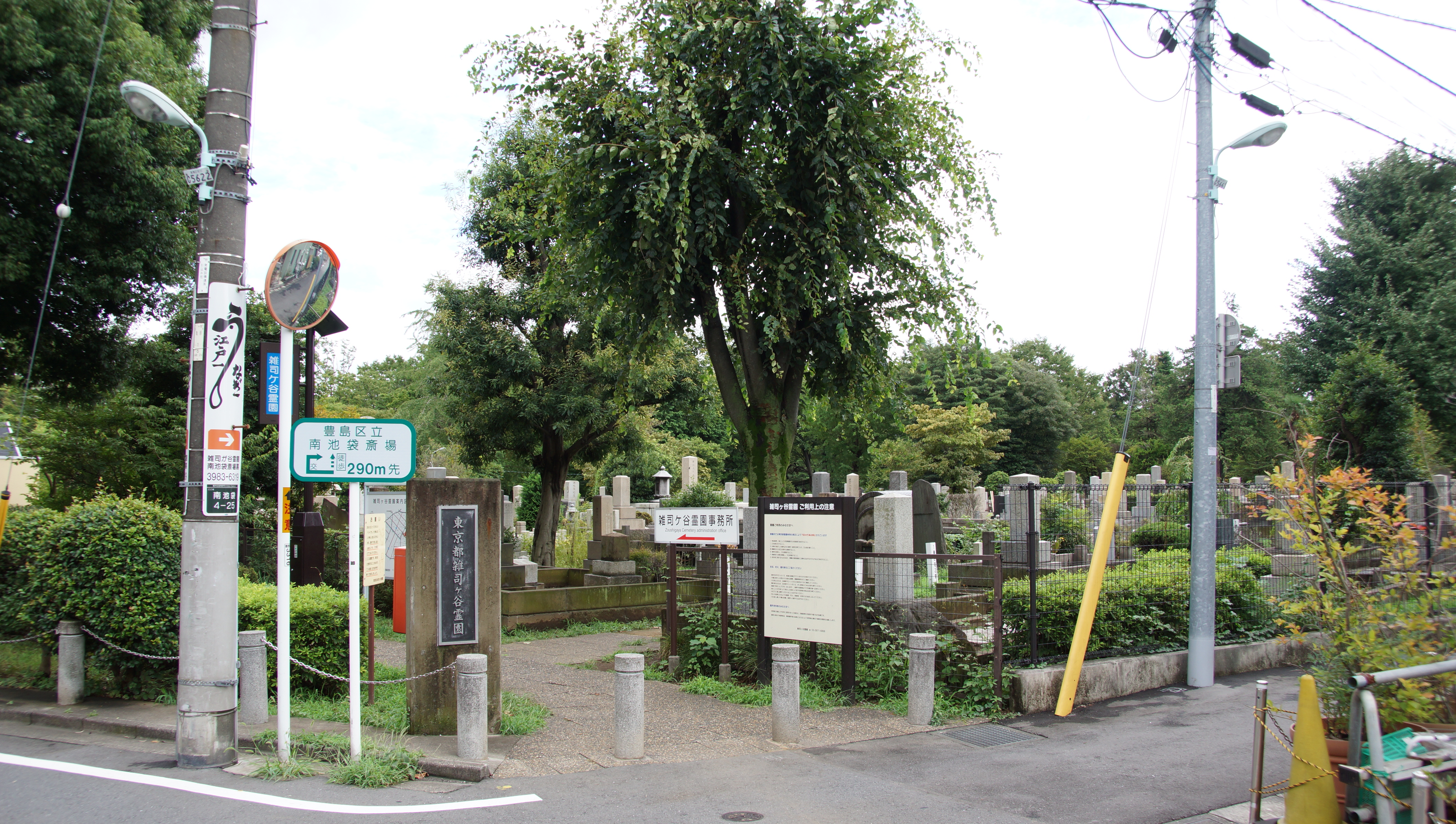
The entrance to Zoshigaya Cemetery close to the station in August 2016

- Zoshigaya Cemetery
- Toshima Ward Office

== See also ==
- List of railway stations in Japan
