= Zoshigaya Missionary Museum =

Coordinates: 35°43′15″N 139°43′14″E

The Zoshigaya Missionary Museum (雑司が谷旧宣教師館, Zōshigaya Kyū Senkyōshi-kan) is located at 1-25-5 Zōshigaya, Toshima, Tokyo. The museum is closest to Toden-zoshigaya Station on the Tokyo Sakura Tram and the Zoshigaya Station on the Tokyo Metro Fukutoshin Line.

== History ==
This Western-style building was a residence and religious center of John Moody McCaleb (1861–1953) who was an American Christian missionary associated with the Churches of Christ. The two-story wooden house was put up in 1907. McCaleb created a strongpoint of missionary activities and early childhood education and he made his garden available to neighboring children as a playground. The building has belonged to Toshima by the conservation movement of community residence since 1982 and it was registered as tangible cultural asset of the city in 1987. Regular lectures and concerts are held there.
