= Mejiro, Tokyo =

Residential district of Toshima, Tokyo, Japan

Coordinates: 35°43′14″N 139°42′36″E

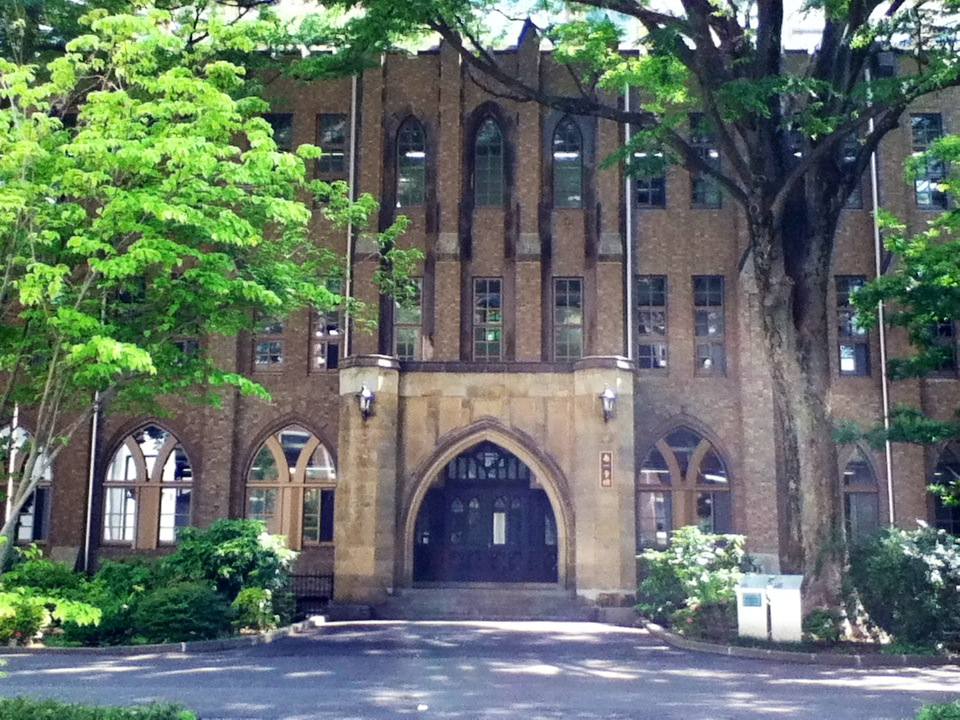
Gakushuin University 1 gou kan

Mejiro (目白) is a residential district of Toshima, Tokyo, Japan, centered at Mejiro Station of Yamanote Line. The district's name (literally "white eyes") is after Mejiro Fudō, which is one of the Goshiki Fudō.

Mejiro is home to the prestigious Gakushuin University. The university's predecessor was established in 1877 to educate the children of the nobility. Its notable alumni include most members of the present Imperial House of Japan as well as the 59th Prime Minister of Japan Tarō Asō. It is also home to the first dojo and namesake of Shotokan karate, which was destroyed in 1945 during World War II.
