= Toshima =

Special ward in Tokyo, Japan

Toshima 豊島区
- Special ward
- Toshima City
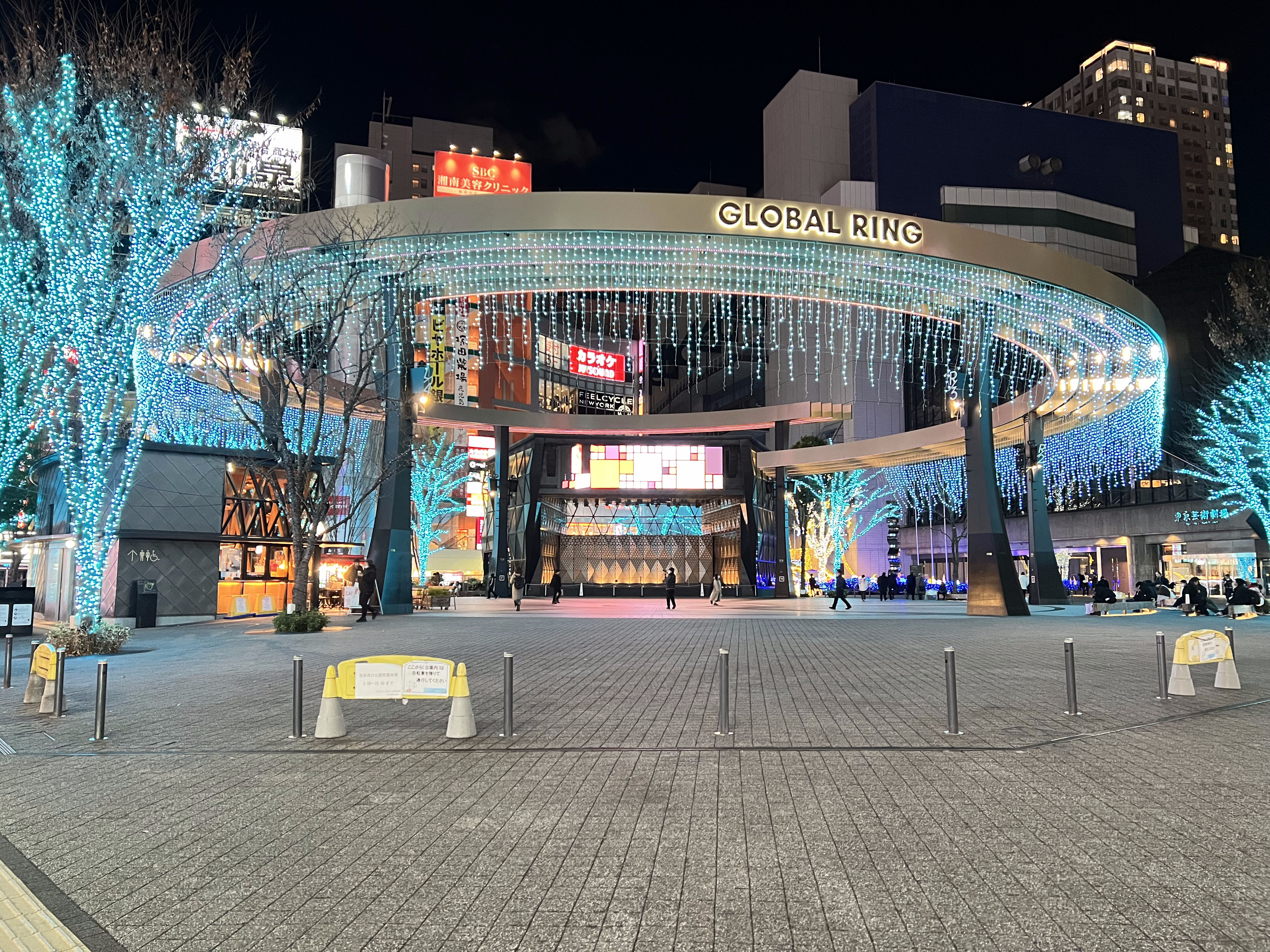
- Ikebukuro at night in Toshima

- Flag Seal

- Location of Toshima in Tokyo

- Location in Japan
- Coordinates: 35°44′00″N 139°43′00″E
- Country: Japan
- Region: Kantō
- Prefecture: Tokyo

Government
  - Mayor: Miyuki Takagiwa (from April 24, 2023)

Area
  - Total: 13.01 km^{2} (5.02 sq mi)

Population (October 1, 2020)
  - Total: 301,599
  - Density: 23,182/km^{2} (60,040/sq mi)
- Time zone: UTC+09:00 (JST)
- City hall address: 1-18-1 Higashi Ikebukuro; 170-8422
- Website: www.city.toshima.lg.jp
- Symbols
- Flower: Azalea
- Tree: Prunus × yedoensis

Toshima (豊島区, Toshima-ku; Japanese pronunciation: [tò̞.ɕí.mä́(.kɯ̈̀), tó̞.ɕì.mä̀]) is a special ward in the Tokyo Metropolis in Japan. It is one of the eight central wards of the Tokyo Metropolitan area. Located in the northern area of Tokyo, Toshima is bordered by the wards of Nerima, Itabashi, and Kita in the north and Nakano, Shinjuku, and Bunkyo in the south.

The ward was founded on March 15, 1947, and reached a peak resident population of 370,000 in 1965. The population has continued to decline and as of May 1, 2015, the ward had an estimated population of 298,250, with a population density of 22,920 persons per km^{2}. During the day the population swells with commuters, resulting in a daytime population of around 378,475.

The total land area of Toshima is 13.01 km^{2}, sitting on a moderate plateau with a difference of 28 m between the ward's highest and lowest points. Approximately 47% of Toshima's land is residential, and 20% is commercial and public areas.

Although Toshima is a ward, it is referred to as a city. The ward offices are located in Ikebukuro, which is also the commercial and entertainment center of Toshima.

With a non-Japanese population of 19,868, or 7.42% of the total, Toshima is one of the most international wards in Tokyo. Of the foreign population, 56% is of Chinese descent, 20% is of Korean descent, and the rest are of primarily Filipino and European descent.

== History ==
Toshima was formed in 1932 by the merger of four towns, Sugamochō, Nishi-sugamochō, Takadachō, and Nagasakichō, bordered by the quickly expanding former city of Tokyo.

The area evolved from a suburban agricultural district in the Edo period to the urban commercial center that it is today. The growth was fueled by the construction of various rail lines built in the Meiji and Taishō periods.

The former Somei village, now part of Toshima, was a center of plant nurseries, and is the birthplace of the Somei Yoshino, Japan's most popular variety of sakura (cherry blossom tree). The variety was developed at the end of the Edo period.

== Demographics ==
Historical population
Year	Pop.	±%
1920	109,803	—
1930	236,701	+115.6%
1940	312,209	+31.9%
1945	92,192	−70.5%
1950	217,141	+135.5%
1960	363,193	+67.3%
1970	354,427	−2.4%
1980	288,626	−18.6%
1990	261,870	−9.3%
2000	249,017	−4.9%
2010	284,678	+14.3%
2020	301,599	+5.9%
Source: Censuses (Note: For years prior to 1930, figures cover the area of present-day Toshima-ku.)

== Politics and government ==
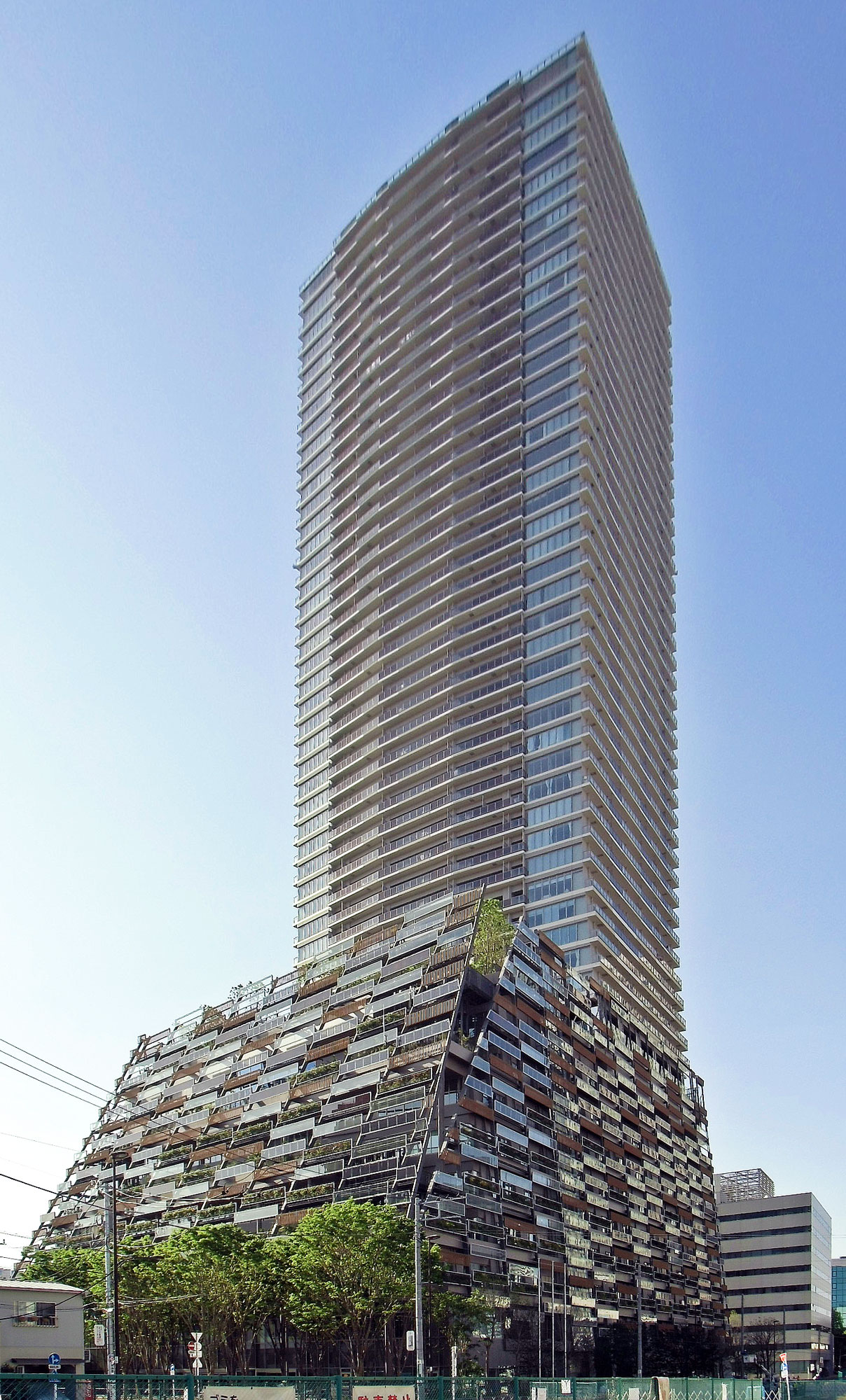
Toshima ward office

Toshima is run by a city assembly of 36 elected members. The current mayor is Yukio Takano, an independent backed by all major parties except the Japanese Communist Party.

In April 2011, Taiga Ishikawa was elected to the Toshima assembly, becoming the first openly gay man to win an election in Japanese history.

== Districts and neighborhoods ==
Nagasaki Area

- Chihaya
- Kanamechō
- Mejiro^{a}
- Minaminagasaki
- Nagasaki
- Nishiikebukuro^{b}
- Senkawa
- Takamatsu

Nishisugamo Area

- Agariyashiki
- Higashiikebukuro
- Ikebukuro
- Ikebukuro Honchō
- Kamiikebukuro
- Kitaōtsuka^{c}
- Mejiro^{d}
- Minamiikebukuro^{e}
- Minamiōtsuka^{f}
- Nishiikebukuro^{g}
- Nishisugamo

Sugamo Area

- Kitaōtsuka^{h}
- Komagome
- Minamiōtsuka^{i}
- Sugamo

Takada Area

- Mejiro^{j}
- Minamiikebukuro^{k}
- Nishiikebukuro^{l}
- Takada
- Zōshigaya

Notes:

- ^{a} - 4, 5-chōme
- ^{b} - 4-chōme
- ^{c} - 2, 3-chōme
- ^{d} - 4-chōme
- ^{e} - 1-chōme
- ^{f} - 3-chōme
- ^{g} - 1, 3-chōme
- ^{h} - 1-chōme
- ^{i} - 1, 2-chōme
- ^{j} - 1, 2, 3-chōme
- ^{k} - 2, 3, 4-chōme
- ^{l} - 2-chōme

== Sights ==
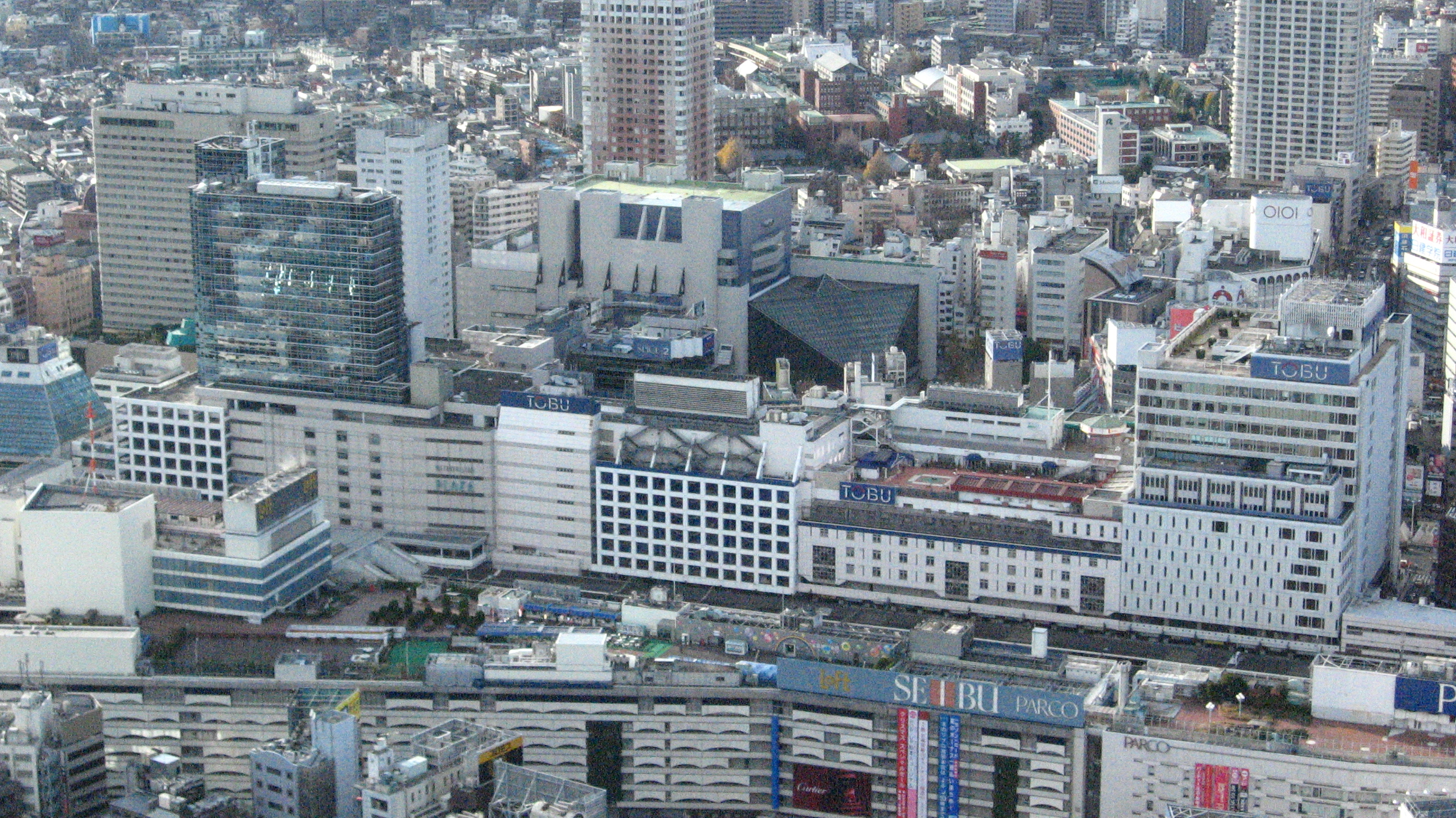
Ikebukuro Station

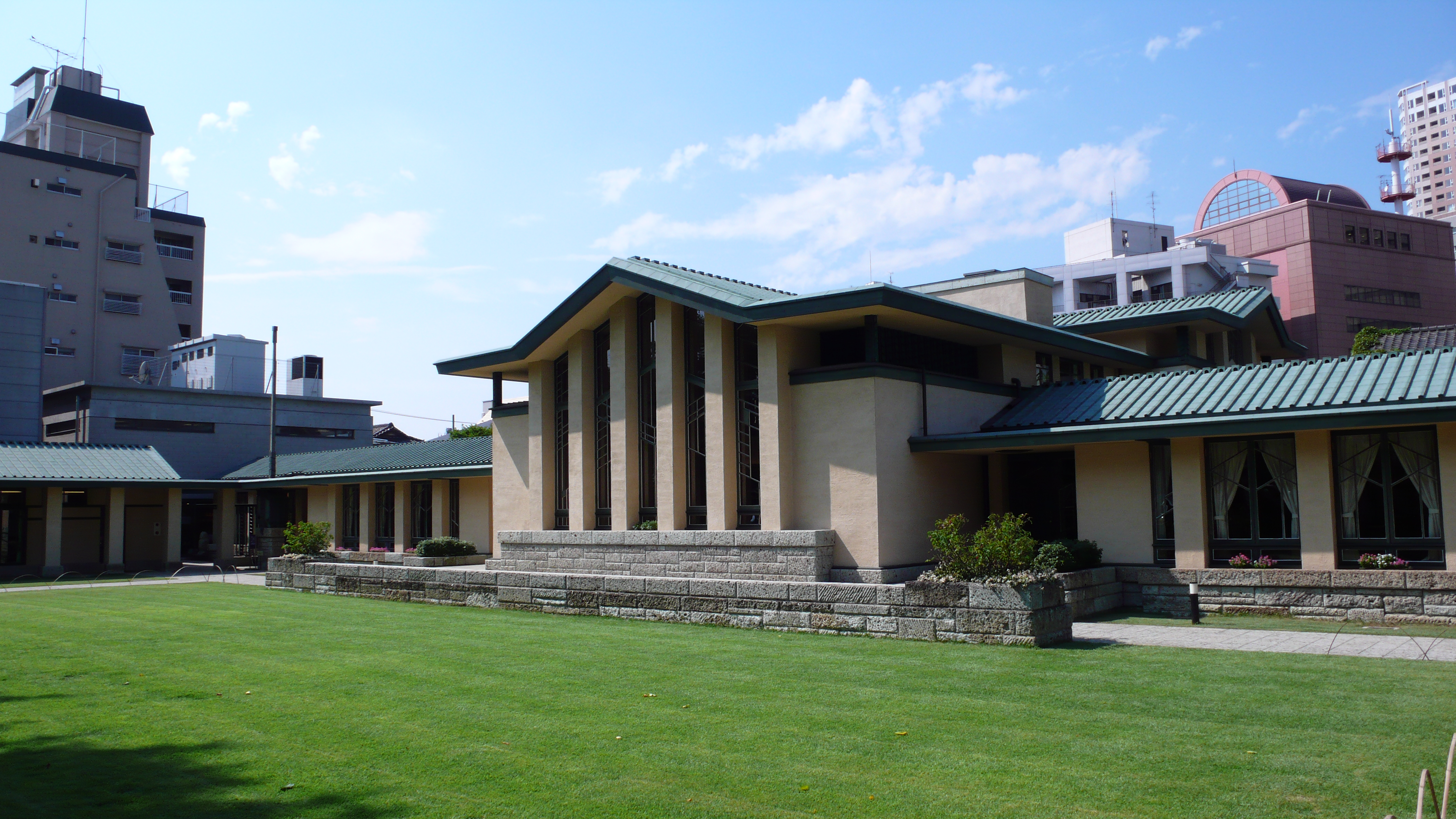
Myonichikan of Jiyu Gakuen

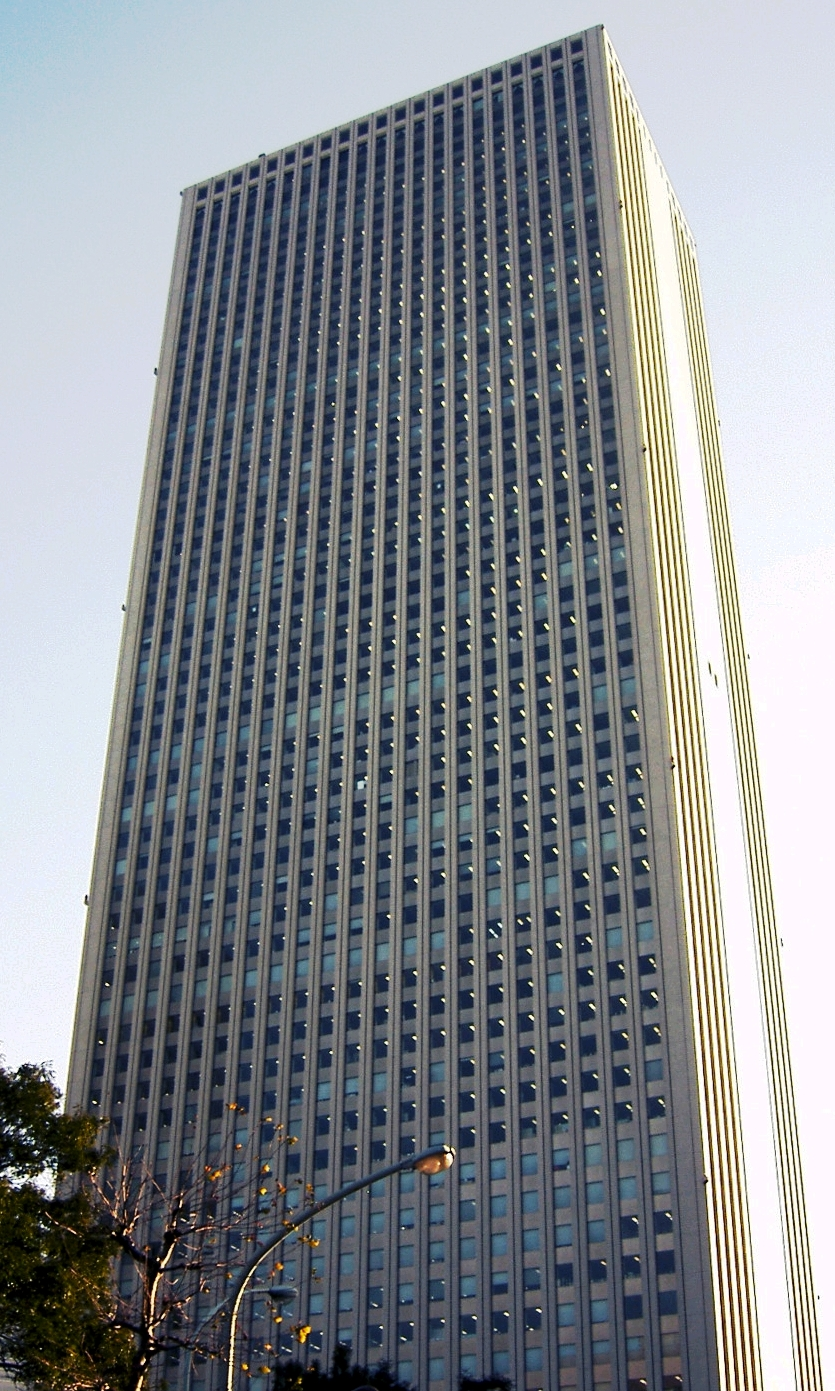
Sunshine 60 building

- Sunshine City: The focal point of much of the entertainment in and around Ikebukuro, Sunshine City sports some of the best shopping and dining in Toshima.
- The Ancient Orient Museum
- Morikazu Kumagai Art Museum
- Zoshigaya Missionary Museum
- Toyota Amlux Showroom building is located here
- Tokiwa-sō, an apartment complex famous for being the early living-quarters of many prominent manga artists.
- Tokyo Metropolitan Theatre: Near Ikebukuro Station, this facility built in 1990 is one of the newer spots in Toshima and has a concert hall with regular performances and art exhibitions. There is a stage in the open space out front and it is a popular place for amateur musicians during the warmer months.
- Myonichikan of Jiyu Gakuen Girls' School: Designed by famous American architect Frank Lloyd Wright, this notable building was completed in 1922, shortly before he completed work on the Imperial Hotel.
- Sugamo Jizodori: The shopping district known as "old ladies' Harajuku."

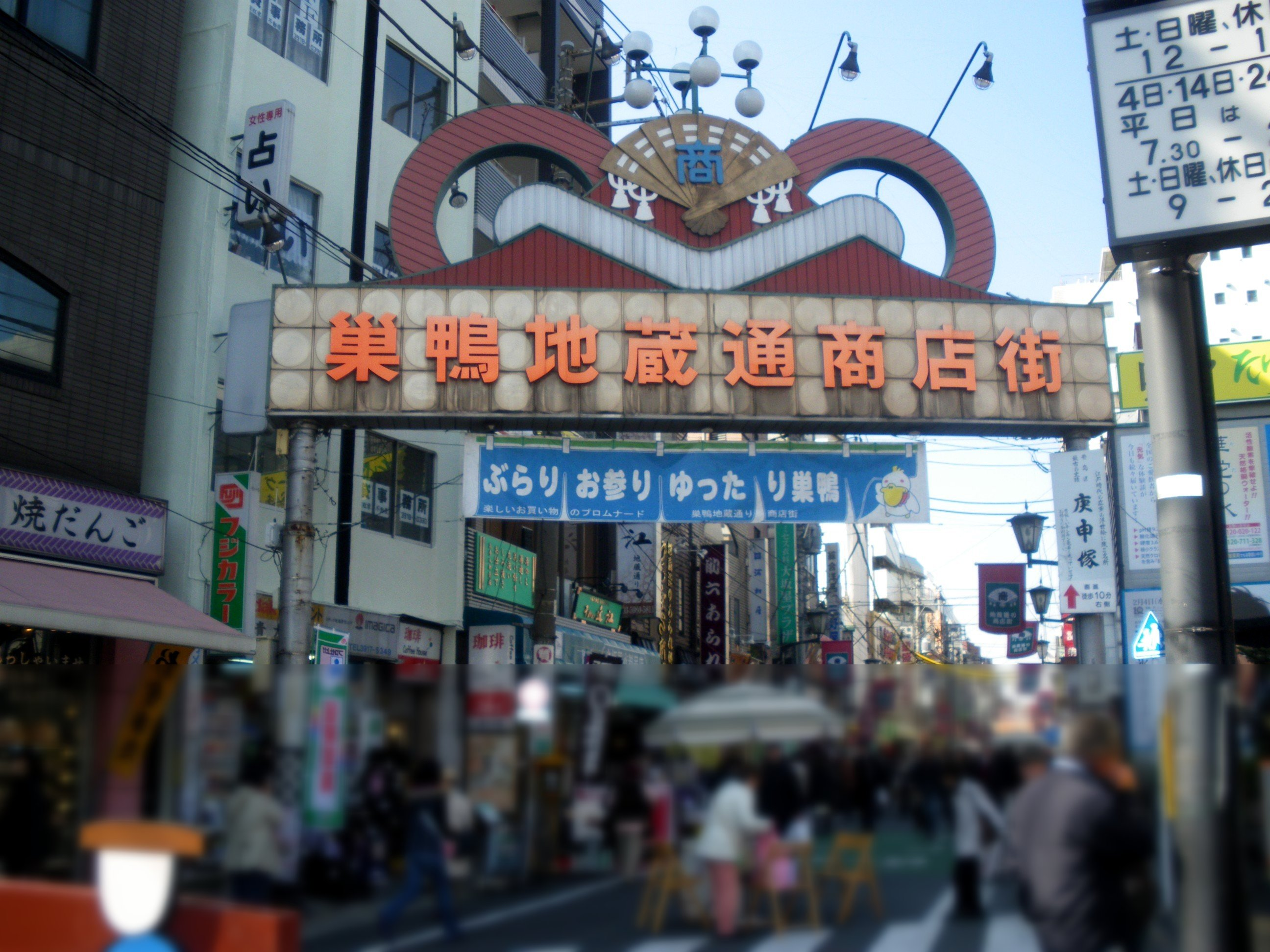
Togenuki Jizo Street in Sugamo

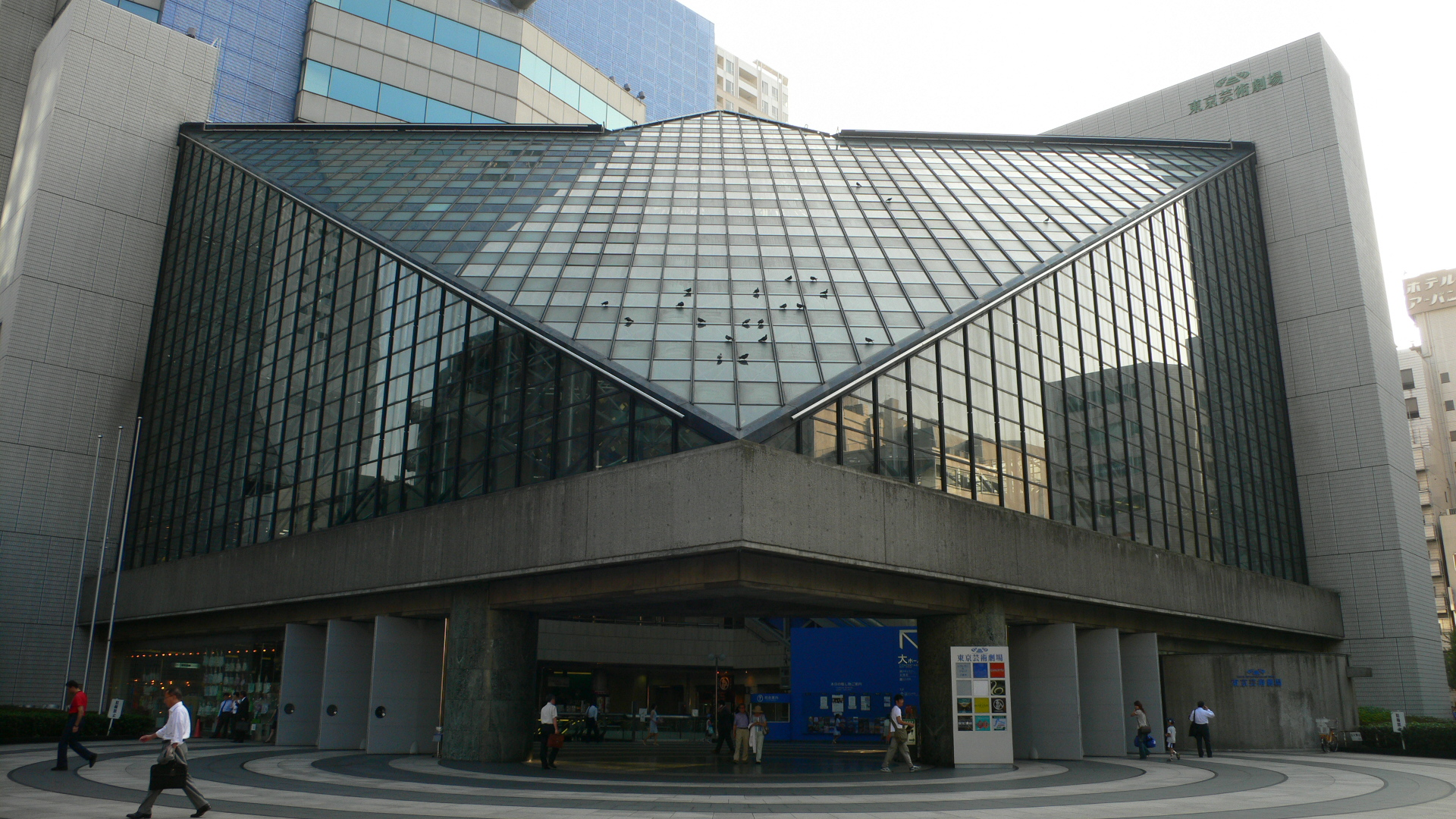
Tokyo Metropolitan Art Space

=== Festivals ===
- Fukuro Matsuri: This festival started in 1968 and features a parade of mikoshi (portable shrines) and a yassa dance. It is held on September 14 and 15 of each year outside the west exit of Ikebukuro Station and attracts as many as 200,000 people.
- Otsuka Awa Odori Dance: A large summer event gathering 150,000 people, this festival features groups performing and competing with colorful costumes and dancing in front of JR Ōtsuka Station.
- Nagasaki Shishimai (lion dance): The lion dance is performed every year on the second Sunday of May at Nagasaki Shrine.

== Economy ==
FamilyMart has its headquarters in Ikebukuro, Toshima. Seiyu Group has its registered head office in Toshima. Libro, a bookstore chain, is headquartered in Toshima. Itochu corporation and Seven & I Holdings Co., Ltd. has a presence in Toshima. Taisho Pharmaceutical, a pharmaceutical company, also has its headquarters in the ward.

In 1956, Asatsu Inc. established its headquarters in Mejiro, Toshima. In May 1967, the company's headquarters moved to Shinbashi, Minato.

Other companies headquartered in Toshima, which boast high visibility through advertising placements, include CCS as a representative example.

== Education ==
There are six universities in Toshima.

- Gakushuin University
- Tokyo College of Music
- Rikkyo University, or St. Paul's University
- Taisho University
- Tokyo International University
- Tokyo University of Social Welfare

Two prestigious universities are located bordering Toshima. They are the University of Tokyo in Bunkyo and Waseda University bordering Shinjuku. The Tokyo Metropolitan Government Board of Education operates area public high schools.

Toshima is also home to a number of accredited private schools:

- Rikkyo Ikebukuro Junior and Senior High School

Toshima City Board of Education (豊島区教育委員会) operates public elementary and junior high schools.

Municipal junior high schools:

- Chitosebashi Junior High School (千登世橋中学校)
- Ikebukuro Junior High School (池袋中学校)
- Komagome Junior High School (駒込中学校)
- Meiho Junior High School (明豊中学校)
- Nishiikebukuro Junior High School (西池袋中学校)
- Nishisugamo Junior High School (西巣鴨中学校)
- Senkawa Junior High School (千川中学校)
- Sugamokita Junior High School (巣鴨北中学校)

Municipal elementary schools:

- Asahi Elementary School (朝日小学校)
- Chihaya Elementary School (千早小学校)
- Fujimidai Elementary School (富士見台小学校)
- Gyoko Elementary School (仰高小学校)
- Hosei Elementary School (豊成小学校)
- Hoyu Elementary School (朋有小学校)
- Ikebukuro Elementary School (池袋小学校)
- Ikebukuro Daiichi (No. 1) Elementary School (池袋第一小学校)
- Ikebukuro Daisan (No. 3) Elementary School (池袋第三小学校)
- Ikebukuro Honcho Elementary School (池袋本町小学校)
- Kaname Elementary School (要小学校)
- Komagome Elementary School (駒込小学校)
- Konan Elementary School (高南小学校)
- Mejiro Elementary School (目白小学校)
- Minami Ikebukuro Elementary School (南池袋小学校)
- Nagasaki Elementary School (長崎小学校)
- Nishisugamo Elementary School (西巣鴨小学校)
- Sakura Elementary School (さくら小学校)
- Seiwa Elementary School (清和小学校)
- Shiinamachi Elementary School (椎名町小学校)
- Sugamo Elementary School (巣鴨小学校)
- Takamatsu Elementary School (高松小学校)

Municipal kindergartens:

- Ikebukuro Kindergarten (池袋幼稚園)
- Minami Nagasaki Kindergarten (南長崎幼稚園)
- Nishisugamo Kindergarten (西巣鴨幼稚園)

== Transportation ==
=== Rail ===
The main hub for rail transportation in Toshima ward is Ikebukuro Station, the second busiest train station in Japan.

The rail lines which run through or terminate in Toshima are:

- East Japan Railway Company (JR East)
  - Saikyō Line: Ikebukuro, Itabashi stations
  - Shōnan-Shinjuku Line: Ikebukuro station
  - Yamanote Line: Ikebukuro, Ōtsuka, Sugamo, Komagome stations
- Seibu Railway
  - Seibu Ikebukuro Line: Ikebukuro, Shiinamachi, Higashi-Nagasaki stations
- Tōbu Railway
  - Tōbu Tōjō Line: Ikebukuro, Kita-Ikebukuro, Shimo-Itabashi stations
- Tokyo Metropolitan Bureau of Transportation (Toei)
  - Toei Mita Line: Sugamo, Nishi-sugamo stations
  - Tokyo Sakura Tram (Toden Arakawa Line): Shin-kōshinzuka, Kōshinzuka, Sugamoshinden, Ōtsuka-ekimae, Mukōhara, Higashi-ikebukuro-yonchōme, Toden-zōshigaya, Kishibojimmae, Gakushūinshita stations
- Tokyo Metro
  - Tokyo Metro Yūrakuchō Line: Senkawa, Kanamecho, Ikebukuro, Higashi-ikebukuro stations
  - Tokyo Metro Fukutoshin Line: Senkawa, Kanamecho, Ikebukuro, Zōshigaya stations
  - Tokyo Metro Marunouchi Line: Ikebukuro station
  - Tokyo Metro Namboku Line: Komagome station

== Notable people from Toshima ==
- Mone Inami, professional golfer
- Jun Matsumoto, singer, actor, and member of Arashi
- Koki Morita, professional footballer
- Kō Shibasaki, singer and actress
- Tatsuro Yamashita, singer-songwriter and record producer
