= Takanawa (disambiguation) =

Takanawa (Japanese: 高縄 or 高輪) may refer to the following places:

- Takanawa, a neighborhood in Minato, Tokyo, Japan.
  - Takanawa Residence, an Imperial residence in Tokyo.
  - Takanawa Gateway Station, a railway station in Minato, Tokyo.
  - Takanawa Great Wooden Gate, checkpoint in Edo period Japan, now located in Takanawa, Minato.
  - Takanawa Shrine, a Shintō shrine in Tokyo.
- Takanawa Peninsula, a peninsula in Ehime Prefecture, Japan.
- Takanawa Embankment, a former railway embankment in Japan.
