= MoN Takanawa =

Museum in Minato, Tokyo, Japan

MoN Takanawa: The Museum of Narratives
- Interactive map of the MoN Takanawa: The Museum of Narratives area

General information
- Location: 3-16-1 Mita, Minato, Tokyo, Japan
- Coordinates: 35°38′23″N 139°44′31″E
- Opened: 28 March 2026

Design and construction
- Architect: Kengo Kuma & Associates (exterior design)

Website
- Official website

MoN Takanawa: The Museum of Narratives is a museum in Minato, Tokyo, Japan. It opened March 2026 and is located within the Takanawa Gateway City development.

Its name alludes to the words "gate" (門, mon), in reference to Takanawa Great Wooden Gate and Takanawa Gateway Station, and "question" (問, mon). The museum aims, through its displays and performances, to combine traditional Japanese culture with themes relating to the future.

== See also ==
- Suntory Museum of Art
- Nezu Museum
