= Wandance =

Japanese manga series

- First tankōbon volume cover, featuring Kaboku Kotani (back) and Hikari Wanda (front)

ワンダンス (Wandansu)
- Genre: Coming-of-age; Romance; Sports
- Manga
- Written by: Coffee
- Published by: Kodansha
- English publisher: NA: Kodansha USA
- Imprint: Afternoon KC
- Magazine: Monthly Afternoon
- Original run: January 25, 2019 – present
- Volumes: 16
- Anime television series
- Directed by: Michiya Kato
- Written by: Michiya Kato
- Music by: Naoki "naotyu" Chiba
- Studio: Madhouse; Cyclone Graphics
- Licensed by: Disney Platform Distribution
- Original network: ANN (TV Asahi)
- Original run: October 8, 2025 – December 24, 2025
- Episodes: 12
- Live-action film
- Directed by: Naoya Kusaba
- Written by: Keiichi Kobayashi
- Studio: Happinet Phantom Studios
- Released: October 31, 2026 (Tokyo); November 27, 2026 (Japan)
- icon

Wandance (Japanese: ワンダンス, Hepburn: Wandansu) is a Japanese manga series written and illustrated by Coffee. It has been serialized in Kodansha's seinen manga magazine Monthly Afternoon since January 2019, with its chapters collected in 16 tankōbon volumes as of November 2026. In North America, the manga is licensed for English release by Kodansha USA. An anime television series adaptation produced by Madhouse and Cyclone Graphics aired from October to December 2025. A live-action film adaptation is set to premiere in November 2026.

By August 2026, the manga had over 1.3 million copies in circulation.

== Plot ==
Kaboku Kotani is a stuttering first-year high school student who plans to not bring attention to himself. One day, he notices a classmate named Hikari Wanda dancing alone. Intrigued by the freedom she displays, he decides to join the dance club. The story follows their budding relationship.

== Characters ==
Kaboku Kotani (小谷 花木, Kotani Kaboku)
Voiced by: Koki Uchiyama (Japanese); Kieran Regan (English)
Portrayed by: Jo
Hikari Wanda (湾田 光莉, Wanda Hikari)
Voiced by: Hina Yōmiya (Japanese); Merit Leighton (English)
Portrayed by: Anji Ikehata
On Miyao (宮尾 恩, Miyao On)
Voiced by: Ayaka Suwa (Japanese); Abby Espiritu (English)
Portrayed by: Kira Yamaguchi
Iori Itsukushima (厳島 伊折, Itsukushima Iori)
Voiced by: Toshiki Masuda (Japanese); Mark Whitten (English)
Portrayed by: Ran
Gaku Kabeya (壁谷 楽, Kabeya Gaku)
Voiced by: Yuma Uchida (Japanese); Jonathan Leon (English)
Portrayed by: Tsukki
Usen Takumi (巧 宇千, Takumi Usen)
Voiced by: Yū Hayashi (Japanese); Josh Keaton (English)
Portrayed by: Aloha Takamatsu
Assei (アッセイ)
Voiced by: Chikahiro Kobayashi (Japanese); Andrew Kishino (English)
Hoto (ホト)
Voiced by: Daiki Kobayashi (Japanese); Brandon McInnis (English)
Seiya (誠也)
Voiced by: Junpei Baba (Japanese); Jonathon Ha (English)
Shiki Kanno (神野 志岐, Kanno Shiki)
Voiced by: Haruka Sato (Japanese); Courtney Lin (English)
Aika Naito (内藤 愛果, Naitō Aika)
Voiced by: Haruka Terui (Japanese); Courtney Lin (English)
Anna Itami (伊丹 杏奈, Itami Anna)
Voiced by: Rumi Okubo
Rame Tokiwa (常葉 らめ, Tokiwa Rame)
Voiced by: Keiko Manaka (Japanese); Madeline Dorroh (English)
Hitomi Shimoda (下田 瞳, Shimoda Hitomi)
Voiced by: Yui Watanabe (Japanese); Grace Lu (English)
Kona Okouchi (大河内 古奈, Ōkōuchi Kona)
Voiced by: Ayaka Nanase (Japanese); Haven Schneider (English)
Sakura Kami (加美 桜, Kami Sakura)
Voiced by: Hana Tamegai (Japanese); Bella Stine (English)
Monme Hirai (平井 匁, Hirai Monme)
Voiced by: Rin Kusumi (Japanese); Miya Kodama (English)
Moa Mukogawa (武庫川 藻亜, Mukogawa Moa)
Voiced by: Konomi Inagaki (Japanese); Lisa Kay Jennings (English)
Miru Omori (大森 美瑠, Ōmori Miru)
Voiced by: Honoka Inoue (Japanese); Leona Renee (English)
Yura Nikami (仁上 ゆら, Nikami Yura)
Voiced by: Momoko Miyashiro (Japanese); Miya Kodama (English)
Aoi Date (舘 葵, Date Aoi)
Voiced by: Kana Ogino (Japanese); Kana Shimanuki (English)
Kokoro Shimoda (下田 心, Shimoda Kokoro)
Voiced by: Miyuki Wakayama (Japanese); Madeline Dorroh (English)
Rin Ishikawa (石川 りん, Ishikawa Rin)
Voiced by: Tsukino Chikasada (Japanese); Skyla I'Lece (English)
Sayaka Takada (高田 さやか, Takada Sayaka)
Voiced by: Momoka Ogizono (Japanese); Bella Stine (English)
Mora Kuroe (黒江 モラ, Kuroe Mora)
Voiced by: Kanon Yulduz (Japanese); Rachel Slotky (English)
Ren (練)
Voiced by: Masahiro Yamanaka
Ogi (オギ)
Voiced by: Tatsumaru Tachibana
Chun (チュン)
Voiced by: Shoma Uno (Japanese); Tyler Menjivar (English)
Tatsuya (龍也)
Voiced by: Toshiharu Yajima
Uria (瓜亜)
Voiced by: Junpei Baba (Japanese); Tyler Menjivar (English)
Uyo (紆余)
Voiced by: Daiki Kobayashi
Macchin (マッチン)
Voiced by: Daiki Kobayashi (Japanese); Corey Wilder (English)
Kokoro (ココロ)
Voiced by: Seiyū Fujiwara (Japanese); Corey Wilder (English)

== Media ==
=== Manga ===
Written and illustrated by Coffee, Wandance started in Kodansha's seinen manga magazine Monthly Afternoon on January 25, 2019. Kodansha has collected its chapters into individual tankōbon volumes. The first volume was released on May 23, 2019. As of November 20, 2026, 16 volumes have been released.

Kodansha USA announced the English release of the manga in North America, with the first volume being released on June 28, 2022.

==== Volumes ====
No.	Original release date	Original ISBN	English release date	English ISBN
1	May 23, 2019	978-4-06-515483-0	June 28, 2022	978-1-68491-313-8 (digital); 978-1-64651-466-3 (print)
1. "How Wanda-san Dances" (湾田さんのダンス, Wanda-san no Dansu); 2. "The Dance Club's Boy/Girl Ratio" (ダンス部の男女比, Dansu-bu no Danjohi); 3. "The Audition" (オーディション, Ōdishon); Bonus: "Kotani-kun of the Dance Club Stutters" (ダンス部の小谷君は吃音症, Dansu-bu no Kotani-kun wa Kitsuonshō)
2	November 22, 2019	978-4-06-517482-1	August 30, 2022 (digital); October 4, 2022 (print)	978-1-68491-614-6 (digital); 978-1-64651-516-5 (print)
4. "Afterbeat" (アフタービート, Afutābīto); 5. "The Routine" (振り付け, Furitsuke); 6. "Feeling (Pt. 1)" (フィーリング 前半, Fīringu Zenhan); 7. "Feeling (Pt. 2)" (フィーリング 後半, Fīringu Kōhan); 8. "The World" (世界, Sekai)
3	May 22, 2020	978-4-06-519455-3	October 25, 2022	978-1-68491-722-8 (digital); 978-1-64651-517-2 (print)
9. "First Contest (Pt. 1)" (初コンテスト 前編, Hatsu Kontesuto Zenpen); 10. "First Contest (Pt. 2)" (初コンテスト 中編, Hatsu Kontesuto Chūhen); 11. "First Contest (Pt. 3)" (初コンテスト 後編, Hatsu Kontesuto Kōhen); 12. "On vs. Iori" (恩vs.伊折); 13. "On vs. Kaboku" (恩vs.花木)
4	September 23, 2020	978-4-06-520724-6	January 31, 2023 (digital); February 14, 2023 (print)	978-1-68491-870-6 (digital); 978-1-64651-518-9 (print)
14. "The Style Wall" (ジャンルの壁, Janru no Kabe); 15. "Hit" (ヒット, Hitto); 16. "One Round" (ワンムーヴ, Wan Mūvu); 17. "Reverberation" (反響, Hankyō); 18. "Prelims" (予選, Yosen)
5	March 23, 2021	978-4-06-522662-9	May 23, 2023	979-8-88933-008-0 (digital); 978-1-64651-519-6 (print)
19. "Wanda vs. Macchin" (湾田vs.マッチン); 20. "On vs. Usen" (恩vs.宇千); 21. "Round Two" (2回戦, Nikaisen); 22. "Self-Awareness" (自覚, Jikaku); 23. "Iori vs. Usen" (伊折vs.宇千); Bonus: "Kotera-san's on the Way Up" (歩む小寺さん, Ayumu Kotera-san)
6	September 22, 2021	978-4-06-524817-1	August 29, 2023; September 5, 2023	979-8-88933-214-5 (digital); 978-1-64651-737-4 (print)
24. "Kabo vs. Kabe (Pt. 1)" (カボvs.壁①, Kabo vs. Kabe 1); 25. "Kabo vs. Kabe (Pt. 2)" (カボvs.壁②, Kabo vs. Kabe 2); 26. "Kabo vs. Kabe (Pt. 3)" (カボvs.壁③, Kabo vs. Kabe 3); 27. "Confrontation" (対峙, Taiji); 28. "Kabe vs. Iori (Pt. 1)" (壁vs.伊折①, Kabe vs. Iori 1); 29. "Kabe vs. Iori (Pt. 2)" (壁vs.伊折②, Kabe vs. Iori 2)
7	February 22, 2022	978-4-06-526862-9	November 21, 2023	979-8-88933-304-3 (digital); 978-1-64651-738-1 (print)
30. "Kabe vs. Iori (Pt. 3)" (壁vs.伊折③, Kabe vs. Iori 3); 31. "First Team Battle (Pt. 1)" (初チームバトル①, Hatsu Chīmu Batoru 1); 32. "First Team Battle (Pt. 2)" (初チームバトル②, Hatsu Chīmu Batoru 2); 33. "Wanda-san, Before High School" (湾田さんの入学前, Wanda-san no Nyūgaku Mae); 34. "Offer" (オファー, Ofā)
8	June 22, 2022	978-4-06-527862-8	February 20, 2024	979-8-88933-513-9 (digital); 978-1-64651-808-1 (print)
35. "Parting" (別れ道, Wakaremichi); 36. "Basics" (ベーシック, Bēshikku); 37. "Secret" (秘密, Himitsu); 38. "Props" (プロップス, Puroppusu)
9	October 21, 2022	978-4-06-529496-3	May 21, 2024 (digital); May 28, 2024 (print)	979-8-88933-610-5 (digital); 978-1-64651-913-2 (print)
39. "Entry" (エントリー, Entorī); 40. "Routine" (ルーティン, Rūtin); 41. "Apology" (謝罪, Shazai); 42. "Crash" (クラッシュ, Kurasshu)
10	February 21, 2023	978-4-06-530562-1	August 13, 2024	979-8-89478-033-7 (digital); 978-1-64651-914-9 (print)
43. "Suicide" (スーサイド, Sūsaido); 44. "Summer Starts" (夏休み始まり, Natsuyasumi Hajimari); 45. "Fate" (因縁, Innen); 46. "Dance Arena Regional Qualifiers" (ダンアリ地方予選, Dan Ari Chihō Yosen)
11	September 22, 2023	978-4-06-531974-1	November 12, 2024	979-8-89478-253-9 (digital); 979-8-88877-159-4 (print)
47. "Kabo vs. Wanda" (カボvs.湾田); 48. "Harmony" (調和, Chōwa); 49. "D.A. Regional Prelims, Start!" (ダンアリ地方予選開会, Dan Ari Chihō Yosen Kaikai); 50. "The Show" (本番, Honban); 51. "Fits Like a Glass Slipper" (シンデレラフィット, Shinderera Fitto)
12	April 23, 2024	978-4-06-535023-2	May 13, 2025	979-8-89478-563-9 (digital); 979-8-88877-397-0 (print)
52. "Switch" (スイッチ, Suitchi); 53. "Lessons" (反省, Hansei); 54. "Come Close" (寄せ, Yose); 55. "Style" (ジャンル, Janru); 56. "Progress" (前進, Zenshin)
13	August 22, 2024	978-4-06-536467-3	August 12, 2025	979-8-89478-672-8 (digital); 979-8-88877-487-8 (print)
57. "Used-Clothing Date" (古着デート, Furugi Dēto); 58. "Triangular Relationship" (三角関係, Sankaku Kankei); 59. "Creator" (クリエイター, Kurieitā); 60. "School Festival" (文化祭, Bunka Matsuri); 61. "Leader" (リーダー, Rīdā)
14	September 22, 2025	978-4-06-540508-6	November 10, 2026	979-8-89830-313-6 (digital); 979-8-88877-904-0 (print)
62. "Just Right" (適応, Tekiō); 63. "Boot Up" (始動, Shidō); 64. "Connections" (繋がり方, Tsunagarikata); 65. "WORLD EXPERIMENTAL DC Japan Prelims" (WORLD EXPERIMENTAL DC 日本予選, World Experimental DC Nihon Yosen); 66. "Passion" (パッション, Passhon)
15	December 23, 2025	978-4-06-541760-7	May 11, 2027	979-8-88877-996-5 (print)
67. Anījī (アンイージー); 68. Saishū Shinsa (最終審査); 69. Shirokuro (白黒); 70. Kotae (答え); 71. Ketsui (決意)
16	November 20, 2026	978-4-06-545684-2	—	—
72. Marude Atsui Mono ni Fureta Yō ni (まるで熱いものに触れたように); 73. Shea (シェア); 74. Wanda-san wa Inaku Naru (湾田さんはいなくなる); 75. Ensei (遠征); 76. Taikō Kei (対抗形); 77. Tatta Ichi Mūvu (たった1ムーヴ); 78. "Gomen ne" (「ごめんね」); 79. "Cho Mate yo" (「ちょ待てよ」); 80. Furō Ningen (フロー人間)

=== Anime ===
In August 2024, an anime television series adaptation was announced. It was produced by Madhouse and Cyclone Graphics, and directed by Michiya Kato, who also handled the screenplays and VFX, with Satoshi Tasaki and Taiki Imamura as both character designers and chief animation directors, and Riehata as the dance producer. The series also features original insert songs, including "Kujira", performed by Yaffle featuring Sahnya alongside other songs by Yujin Aramaki, Alisa, Black Boboi, Daigo Sakuragi, Funi, GZO, Hidetake Takayama, Jazztronik, JiN and Seann Bowe, Jua, Kazutake Takeuchi, Marcello Jonno, Michael Yano a.k.a ARK, Monjoe, Riehata, Rikki, Shinichi Osawa, Shinichiro Maruyama, Toru Ishikawa, Uru, Weauxmaque, Wez Atlas, alongside existing songs from Scatman John with music composed by Naoki "naotyu" Chiba. The series aired from October 8 to December 24, 2025, on the IMAnimation W programming block on TV Asahi and its affiliates. The opening theme is "Stare In Wonder", performed by Be:First, while the ending theme is "Wondrous", performed by Elsee.

The series is streaming on Disney+ worldwide and on Hulu in the United States. An English dub premiered on Hulu in November 2025.

==== Episodes ====
No.	Title	Directed by	Storyboarded by	Original release date
1	"Wanda's Dance"; Transliteration: "Wanda-san no Dansu" (Japanese: 湾田さんのダンス)	Masaki Matsumura	Michiya Kato	October 8, 2025
2	"Dance Club Gender Ratio"; Transliteration: "Dansu-bu no Danjohi" (Japanese: ダンス部の男女比)	Kazumasa Isogawa	Yurie Kuniyuki	October 16, 2025 (Note: Episodes 2 and 3 aired at 12:00 a.m. JST, 15 minutes after the regular air time on TV Asahi.)
3	"Audition"; Transliteration: "Ōdishon" (Japanese: オーディション)	Kōki Mori	Masaki Matsumura	October 23, 2025
4	"Choreography Routine"; Transliteration: "Furitsuke – Rūtin" (Japanese: 振り付け-ルーティン)	Kazumasa Isogawa	Kazumasa Isogawa	October 29, 2025
5	"Feeling"; Transliteration: "Fīringu" (Japanese: フィーリング)	Masaki Matsumura	Koji Sawai	November 5, 2025
6	"Contest"; Transliteration: "Kontesuto" (Japanese: コンテスト)	Masaki Matsumura	Masaki Matsumura	November 12, 2025
7	"Wanda's Pre-High School Days"; Transliteration: "Wanda-san no Nyūgaku Mae" (Japanese: 湾田さんの入学前)	Sayaka Kobayashi	Koji Sawai	November 19, 2025
8	"Dance Battle"; Transliteration: "Dansu Batoru" (Japanese: ダンスバトル)	Kazumasa Isogawa	Michiya Kato	November 26, 2025
9	"The Style Wall"; Transliteration: "Janru no Kabe" (Japanese: ジャンルの壁)	Masaki Matsumura	Koji Sawai	December 3, 2025
10	"Prelims"; Transliteration: "Yosen" (Japanese: 予選)	Kōki Mori	Koji Sawai	December 10, 2025
11	"Self-Awareness"; Transliteration: "Jikaku" (Japanese: 自覚)	Sayaka Kobayashi	Michiya Kato	December 17, 2025
12	"Wandance"; Transliteration: "Wandansu" (Japanese: ワンダンス)	Kazumasa Isogawa	Michiya Kato	December 24, 2025

=== Live-action film ===
In December 2025, it was announced that the manga would receive a live-action film adaptation. The film premiered at the Toho Cinemas Roppongi Hills in Tokyo on October 31, 2026, and is set to premiere in Japan nationwide on November 27, 2026. It was directed by Naoya Kusaba and written by Keiichi Kobayashi. Dancing choreography was supervised by dancer and entrepreneur Charisma Kantaro. The film's theme song is "For Us", performed by &Team.

=== Stage play ===
In September 2026, it was announced that a stage play of the manga would run at the MoN Takanawa museum in Tokyo. Titled Wandance on Stage, it is written and directed by Imagine Itо̄, and stars Taki of The Jet Boy Bangerz from Exile Tribe as Kaboku Kotani. It is scheduled to run from March 19–28, 2027.

== Reception ==
In 2020, the manga was one of the 50 nominees for the sixth Next Manga Awards. It was one of the Jury Recommended Works at the 24th Japan Media Arts Festival in 2021, and at the 25th edition in 2022. By August 2026, the manga had over 1.3 million copies in circulation.
