= Takanawa Embankment =

Railway embankment in Japan

- 高輪築堤 (Japanese)
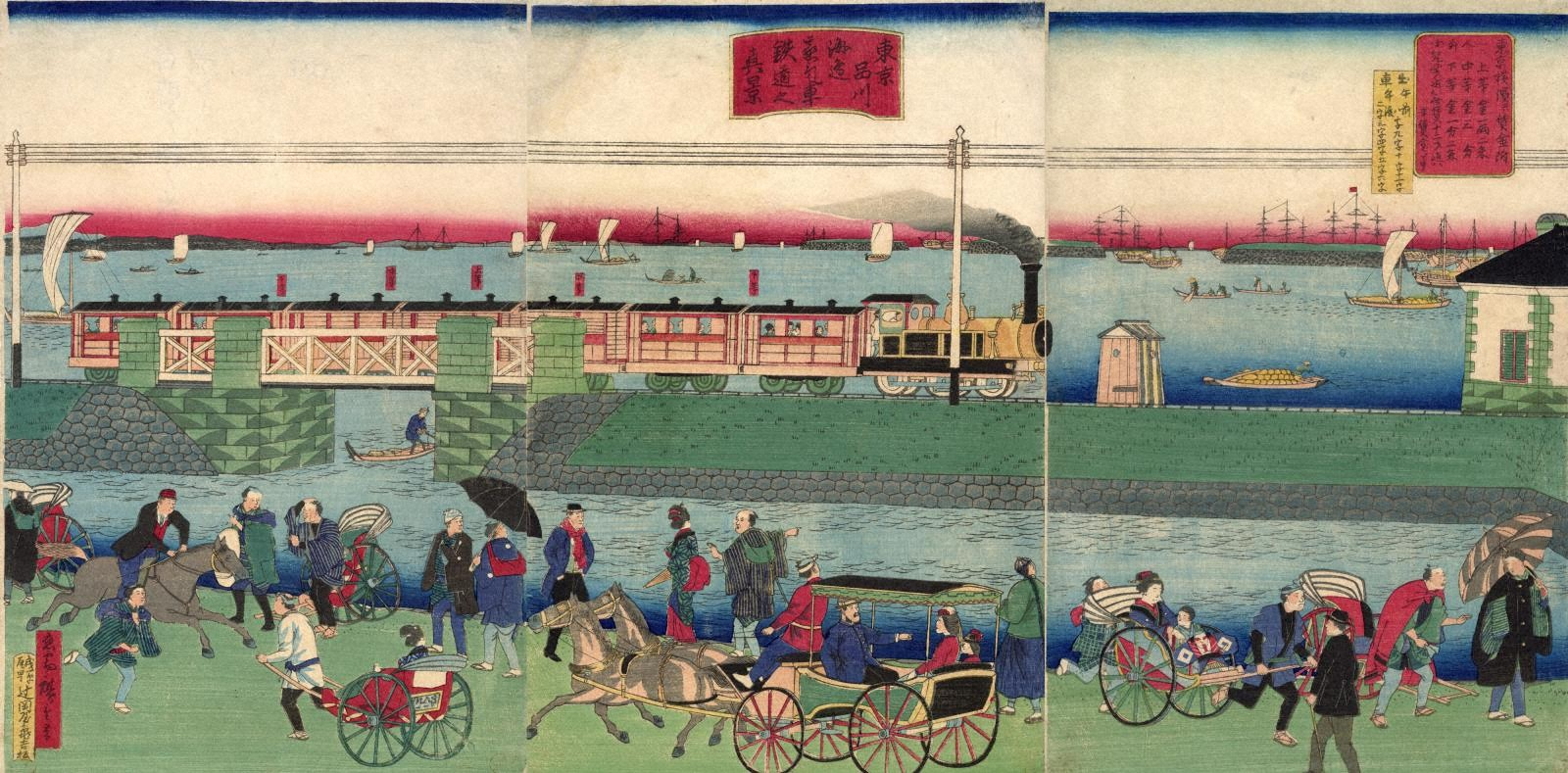
- Woodblock print showing a train over the embankment.

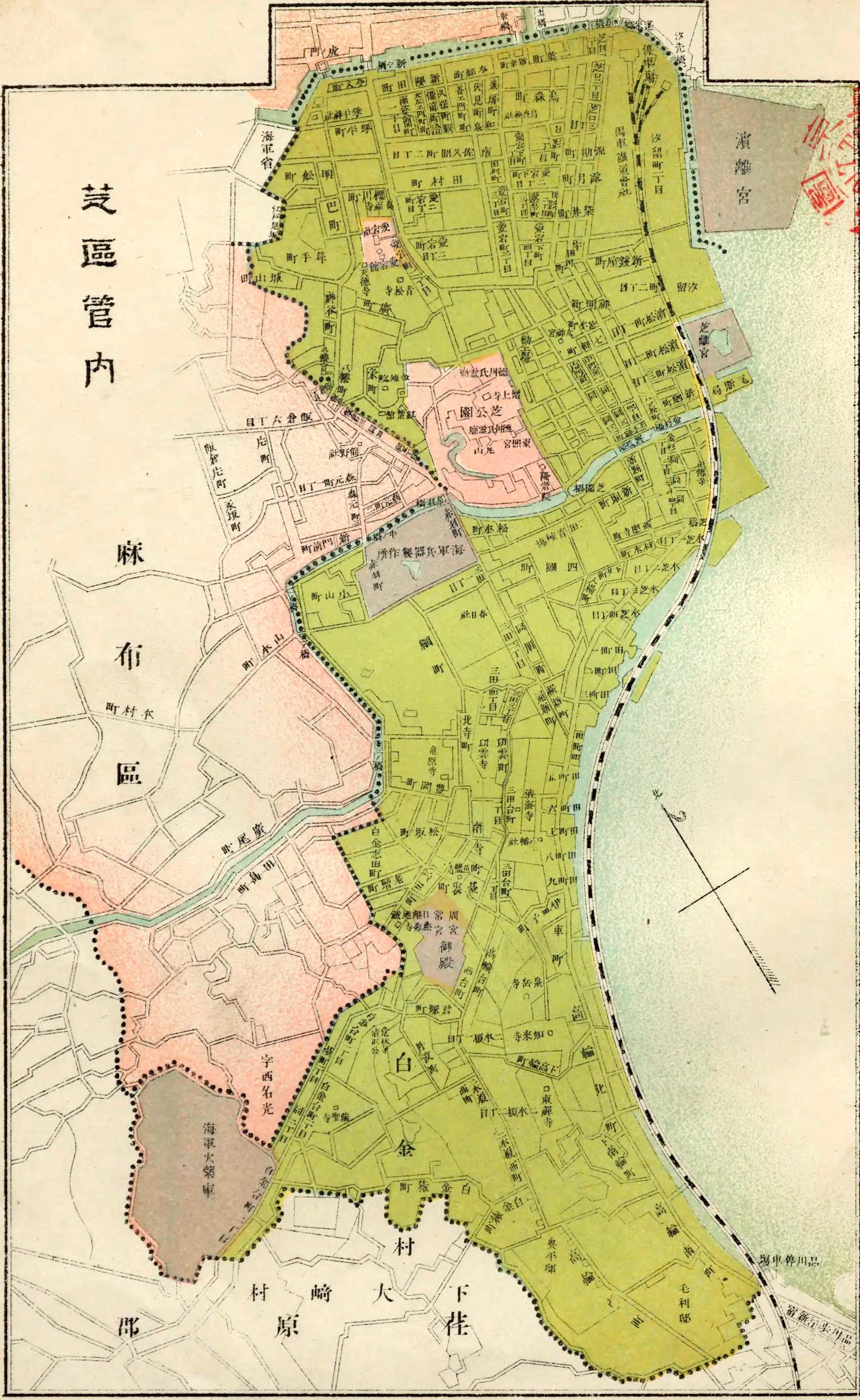
- Type: former railway embankment
- Periods: Meiji Era
- Location: Minato Ward, Tokyo, Japan
- Region: Kantō region

History
- Built: 1870-1872

Site notes
- Length: original: 2.7 km, remaining: 770m
- Width: 6.4 m (21 ft)
- Discovered: 2019

The Takanawa Embankment is a former railway embankment, built when Japan's first railway opened in 1872. A 770m section of the former 2.7 km long embankment was unearthed in 2019 during construction work on the JR Takanawa Gateway Station in Tokyo's Minato Ward. As of late 2021, there was debate among the railway and local government over the need to preserve the structure as an historical relic related to the construction of the railway.

== Description ==
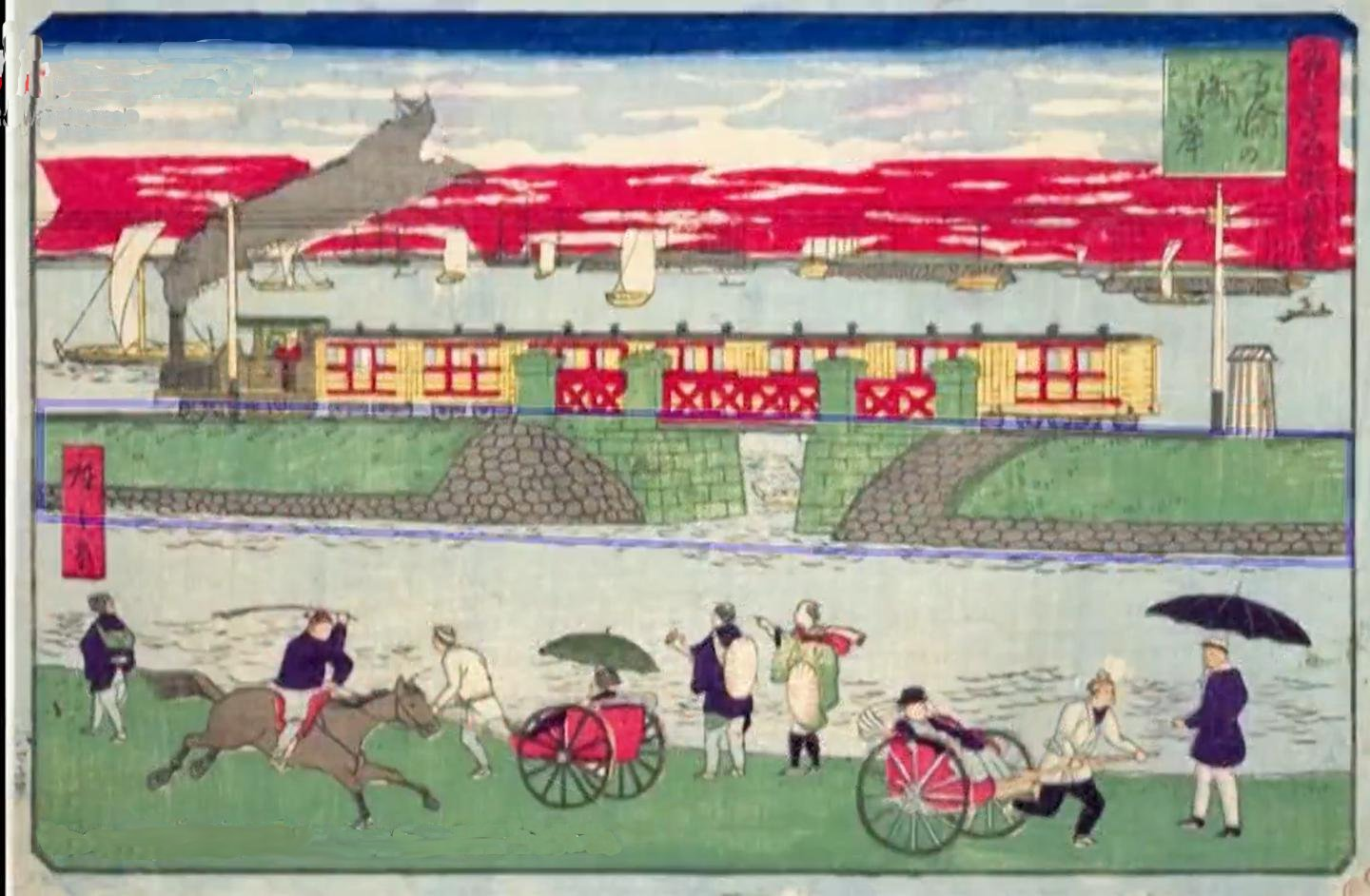
another period view of the embankment, faint blue rectangle added to show the portion still existing

The embankment was part of Japan's first railway, which ran for 29 kilometers between Shimbashi and Yokohama. It was built circa 1872 and ran over shallow water. The trains appear to float over the water and the embankment was a frequent subject in local woodblock prints.

The structure was filled with soil and solidified with stone walls, with trains running on top. Construction began in 1870 between the location of the present Tamachi and Shinagawa stations. “Met with objections from the then Ministry of War to have the route run near land, the maritime route was approved.” It was believed to have been lost when the area was reclaimed during the late Meiji Era. The area is now surrounded by dry land due to past land reclamation and it has significantly changed since the embankment was built.

A letter urging preservation of the embankment by ICOMOS notes that the embankment marks an important milestone in Japanese railway history and represents the start of the country's modernization. They note it is "a hybrid structure, integrating foreign construction techniques from the UK with native Japanese construction techniques."

== Preservation efforts ==
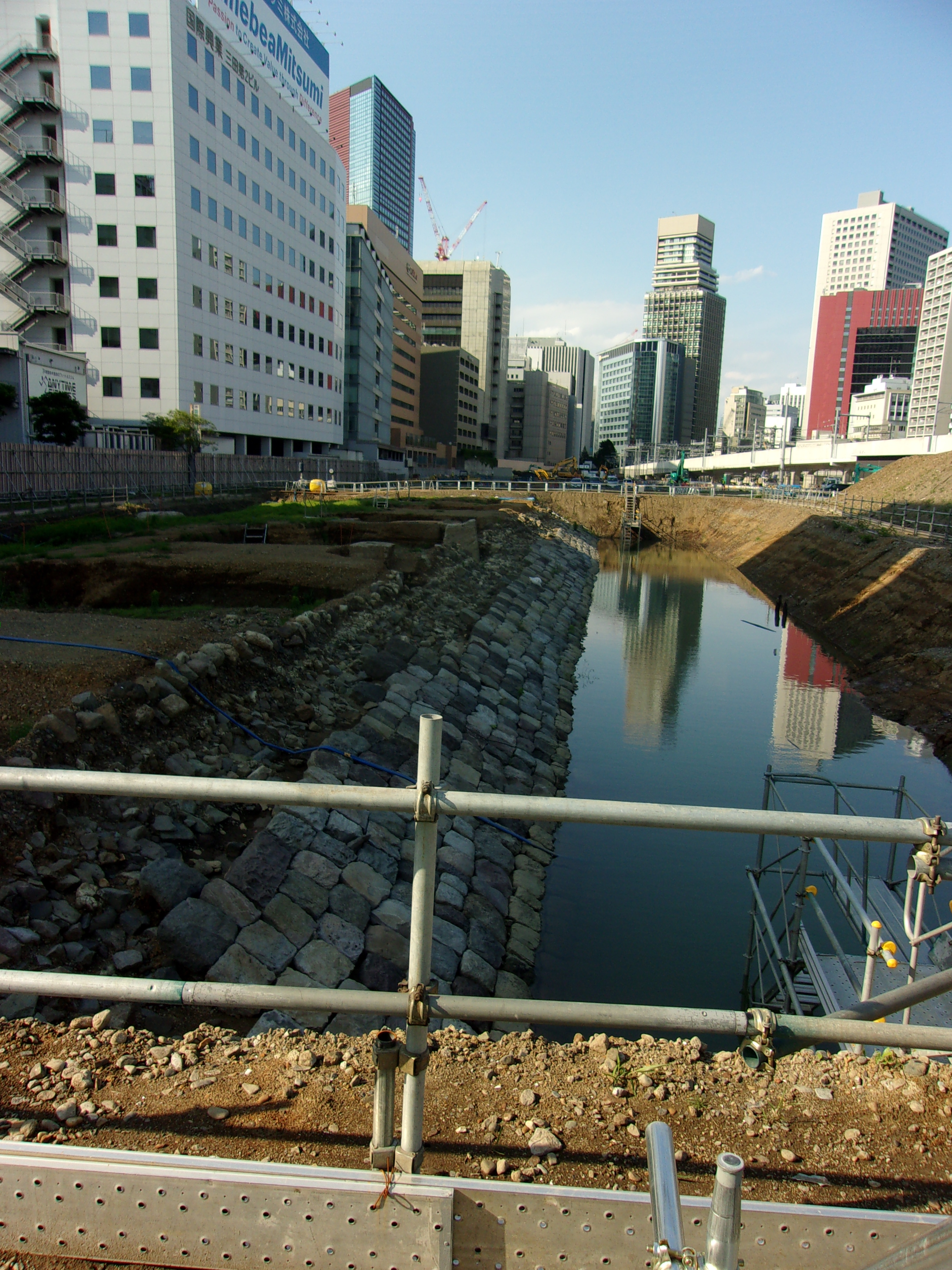
View of the embankment from the Takanawabashi overpass, 2021

Prime Minister Suga Yoshihide visited the site on May 29, 2021, and expressed his wishes that the structure could be preserved. The Japanese Archaeological Association has requested that JR East and the Agency for Cultural Affairs fully preserve the Takanawa embankment, but the railway has said it only intends to preserve the most significant elements of the embankment, notably an 80-meter bridge and a section containing what is believed to be the base for Japan's first railway signal. This signal base was to be moved to another location nearby. Preservation would cost around 40 billion yen, with the railway asking government and other agencies to contribute funds towards preservation.

The Archeological Association has stated that the embankment is " "exceptional in the world" and argues that the railway operator "has the responsibility to preserve all the remaining sections as a relic of East Asia’s first railway" ". The unearthed section run through an area intended to have a skyscraper to accommodate offices and other facilities; maintaining the embankment would significantly raise development costs of the area. The government has asked JR East to find a way to preserve the structure where it is located.

Reporters were given a tour of the mostly unearthed structure on August 23, 2021, and preservation efforts were well underway. It was noted that the embankment was important for the understanding of transportation and civil engineering of the era.

In October 2021, it was announced that Saga Governor Yoshinori Yamaguchi planned to have parts of the embankment relocated and rebuilt to commemorate the efforts of Shigenobu Okuma, a local politician who lobbied to have the embankment built. Per the Saga Prefectural Government: "There were various difficulties before the railway opened, such as financial problems, opposition from local residents and the military, but Okuma overcame [them] with dynamic creativity and determination."

=== Designation ===
The Japanese central government named about 120 m of the embankment as national historic site in September 2021.

ICOMOS issued a heritage alert in February 2022, expressing serious concern over "imminent and irreversible threats to the Takanawa Chikutei maritime railway track embankment (Japan)". A letter has been sent to JR East and local and national authorities reiterating their concern over the threat of the loss of the embankment.
