= Tamachi Station (Tokyo) =

Railway station in Tokyo, Japan

JK22 JY27 Tamachi Station 田町駅
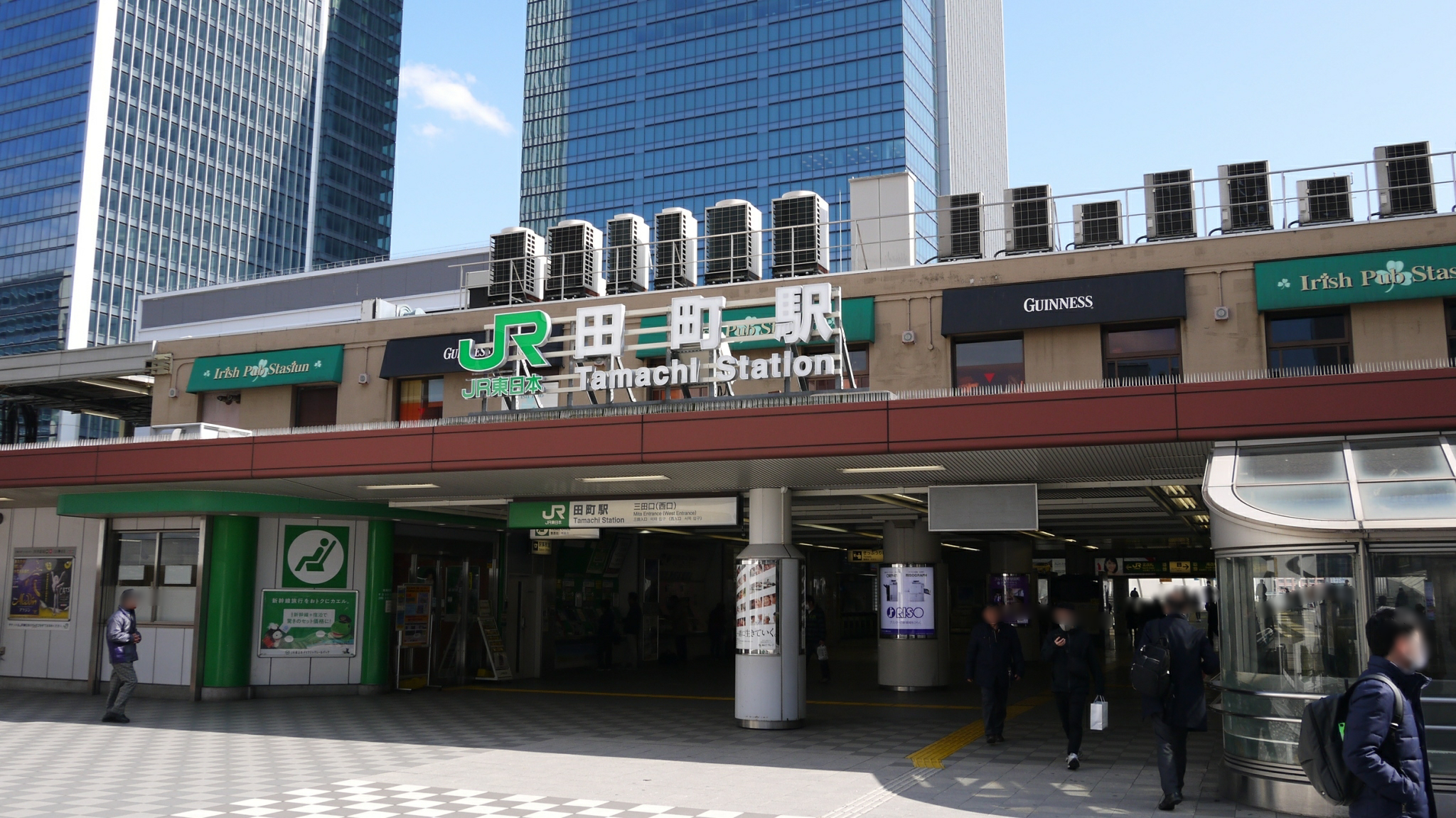
- Main entrance of the station in 2020

General information
- Location: Minato-ku, Tokyo; Japan
- Coordinates: 35°38′44″N 139°44′52″E
- Operator: JR East
- Lines: Yamanote Line; Keihin–Tōhoku Line
- Platforms: 2 island platforms
- Tracks: 4

Construction
- Structure type: Elevated

Other information
- Station code: JK22; JY27

History
- Opened: 16 December 1909; 116 years ago

Passengers
- FY2024: 251,710 (daily)

Services
Preceding station	JR East	Following station
Takanawa Gateway Next clockwise	Yamanote Line	Hamamatsuchō Next counter-clockwise
Takanawa Gateway towards Yokohama	Keihin–Tōhoku Line Rapid Local	Hamamatsuchō towards Ōmiya
Location
- Location within Tokyo Yamanote Loop Location within Tokyo wards area Location within Japan

Tamachi Station (田町駅, Tamachi-eki)(Literal: Rice Field Town Station) is a railway station in the Tamachi neighborhood of Minato, Tokyo, Japan, operated by the East Japan Railway Company (JR East). It is served by the circular Yamanote Line and the Keihin-Tōhoku Line. All trains stop at this station.

Mita Station on the Asakusa and Mita subway lines is within walking distance, although there is no physical connection and the stations are generally not marked as an interchange on route maps. Tamachi is the nearest JR station to Keio University's Mita campus.

== History ==
The Tokaido Main Line opened in 1872 and passed through Tamachi, which was at the time still submerged under Tokyo Bay. The area to the west of the Tokaido Line was filled in to make a temporary stop with the same name in 1876. The stop was short-lived as it was abolished just a year later. Tamachi Station opened on December 16, 1909 as an intermediate station on the newly opened Shinagawa-Karasumori section of the Yamanote Line, then operated by Japanese National Railways. It was the sixteenth stop to open on the Yamanote Line.

The area surrounding the station was predominantly industrial until the 1970s, with several confectionery, electronics and machinery factories. New development shifted to commercial buildings beginning with the Morinaga Plaza Building in 1970. The west side of Tamachi underwent a major redevelopment from 1988, resulting in the current elevated deck and pedestrian bridge over the adjacent Dai-Ichi Keihin road.

== Station layout ==
The station consists of two island platforms providing cross-platform interchange in the direction of travel between the Yamanote Line (platforms 2 and 3) and the Keihin-Tōhoku Line (platforms 1 and 4). As this is the first cross-platform interchange following the intersection of both lines the platforms are comparatively busy.

Chest-high platform edge doors were installed on the Yamanote Line platforms in February 2013, entering operation in March.

1	Keihin-Tōhoku Line	for Tokyo, Ueno, and Ōmiya
2	Yamanote Line	for Tokyo and Ueno
3	Yamanote Line	for Shinagawa and Shibuya
4	Keihin-Tōhoku Line	for Shinagawa, Yokohama, and Ōfuna

== Passenger statistics ==
In fiscal 2023, the JR East station was used by an average of 119,356 passengers daily (boarding passengers only), making it the twenty-fourth-busiest station operated by JR East.

The passenger figures for previous years are as shown below.

Fiscal year	Daily average
2000	154,714
2005	142,778
2010	149,477
2011	148,346
2012	145,724
2013	144,433

== See also ==
- List of railway stations in Japan
- Tamachi
