= Yamanote Line =

Railway loop line in Tokyo, Japan

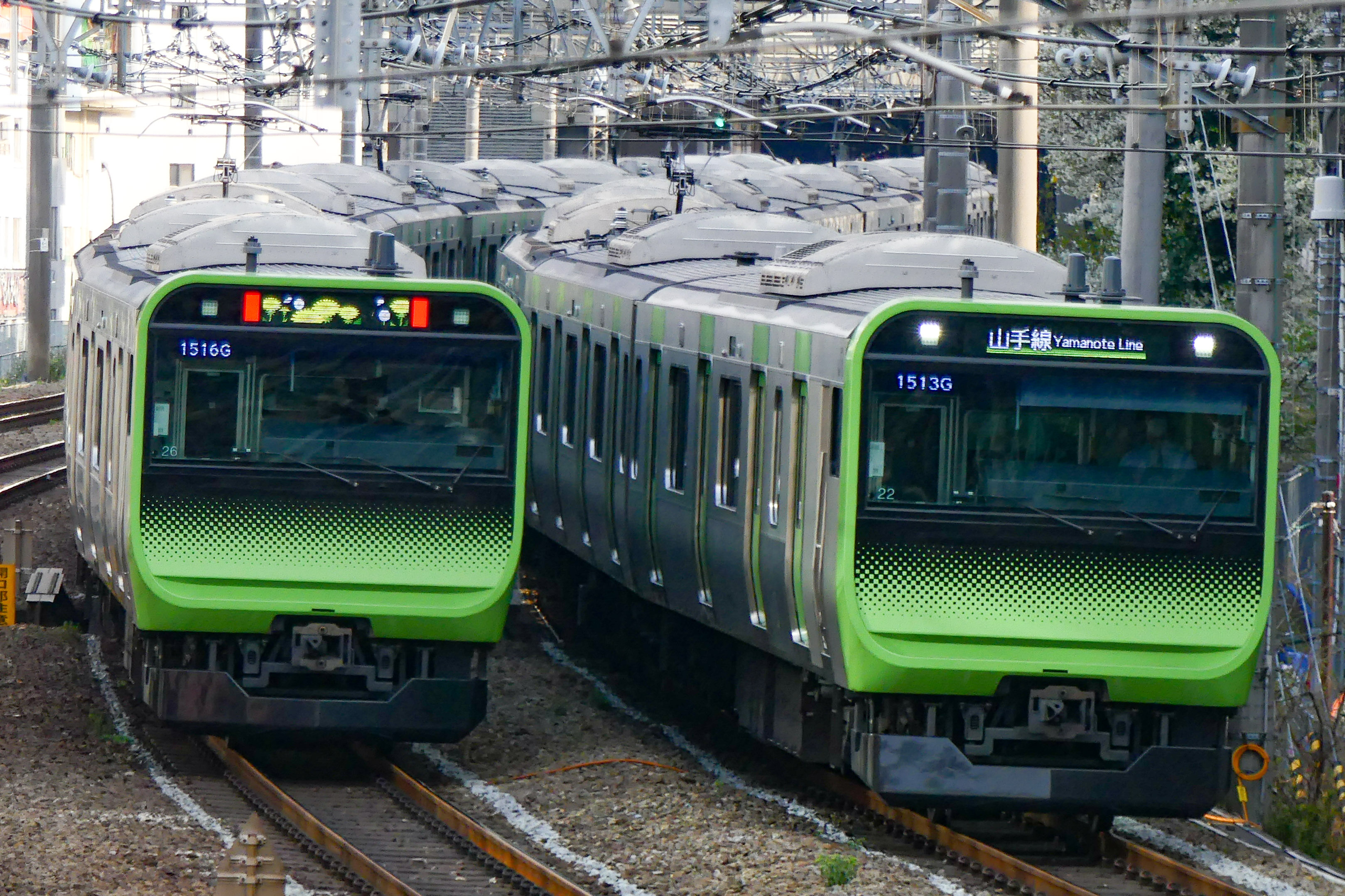
- Yamanote Line E235 series EMUs

Overview
- Native name: 山手線
- Status: In service
- Owner: East Japan Railway Company
- Line number: JY
- Locale: Tokyo, Japan
- Termini: Shinagawa (loop)
- Stations: 30
- Color on map: Yellow green

Service
- Type: Commuter rail
- Operator: East Japan Railway Company
- Depot: Tokyo General Rolling Stock Centre (near Ōsaki Station)
- Rolling stock: E235-0

History
- Opened: 1 March 1885; 141 years ago

Technical
- Line length: 34.5 km (21.4 mi)
- Num of tracks: 2
- Track gauge: 1,067 mm (3 ft 6 in)
- Electrification: Overhead line, 1,500 V DC
- Operating speed: 90 km/h (55 mph)
- Train protection system: D-ATC
- Maximum incline: 3.4%
Route map
Physical lines
Yamanote Line	Tōhoku Main Line	Tōkaidō Main Line

The Yamanote Line (Japanese: 山手線, romanized: Yamanote-sen) is a railway loop service in Tokyo, Japan, operated by the East Japan Railway Company (JR East). It is one of Tokyo's busiest and most important lines, connecting most of Tokyo's major railway stations and commercial and urban centers, including Shinagawa, Shibuya, Shinjuku, Ikebukuro, Ueno, Tokyo, and the Yūrakuchō and Ginza areas. Twenty-eight of its 30 stations provide connections to other railway or subway lines.

In JR East's internal usage, the "Yamanote Line" refers to the 20.6-kilometre (12.8 mi) quadruple-track railway corridor between Shinagawa and Tabata via Shinjuku. The corridor contains two tracks used by Yamanote Line local trains and two parallel tracks known as the "Yamanote Freight Line", used by Saikyō and Shōnan-Shinjuku line trains, some limited express services, and freight trains. In general usage, the "Yamanote Line" refers to the 34.5 km (21.4 mi) loop service that runs through the Yamanote corridor via Shinjuku and along portions of the Tōhoku and Tōkaidō Main Lines via Tokyo.

The area enclosed by the Yamanote Line is commonly regarded as part of the central core of Tokyo. Its loop, however, excludes several historically important commercial districts east of the line, including Asakusa, Nihonbashi, and Ginza.

== Service outline ==
All trains stop at each station and a complete loop takes 59 to 65 minutes. Trains are put into and taken out of service at Ōsaki (which for timetabling purposes is the line's start and terminus) and sometimes Ikebukuro. Certain trains also start from Tamachi in the mornings and end at Shinagawa in the evenings. Trains which run clockwise are known as sotomawari (外回り; "outer circle") and those counter-clockwise as uchi-mawari (内回り; "inner circle"). (Trains travel on the left in Japan, as with road traffic.)

The line also acts as a fare zone destination for JR tickets from locations outside Tokyo, permitting travel to any JR station on or within the loop. This refers to stations on the Yamanote Line as well as the Chūō-Sōbu and Chūō Rapid Lines and between Sendagaya and Ochanomizu.

The Yamanote Line colour used on all rolling stock, station signs and diagrams is JNR Yellow Green No.6 (■, Munsell code 7.5GY 6.5/7.8), known in Japanese as "Japanese bush warbler green" (ウグイス色, uguisu-iro).

== Ridership and overcrowding ==
Due to the Yamanote Line's central location connecting most of Tokyo's major commuter hubs and commercial areas, the line is very heavily used. In the 1990s, sections of the line were running over 250%^{[a]} capacity, and remained above 200%^{[a]} for most of the 2000s. By 2018, crowding on most sections of the Yamanote Line dropped to below 150%^{[a]}. As of 2023, the congestion has dropped further to 125% on the outer loop and 131% on the inner loop. This decrease is due to larger and more frequent trains being introduced to the Yamanote Line and the opening of parallel relief lines such as the Tokyo Metro Fukutoshin Line and Ueno–Tokyo Line.

The ridership intensity of the Yamanote Line in 2018 was 1,134,963 passengers - km / km of route.^{[b]}^{[c]} The daily ridership of the Yamanote Line estimated in a 2015 MLIT National Transit census was about 4 million people per day.^{[b]} However, in both cases "Yamanote Line" refers to JR East's internal definition of the entire rail corridor between Shinagawa and Tabata stations via Shinjuku which includes the ridership of the Saikyō and Shōnan–Shinjuku Lines on the parallel Yamanote freight line. Meanwhile, the ridership of the Yamanote Line services between Tabata and Shinagawa Station via Tokyo are excluded and counted as part of the Tōhoku and Tōkaidō Main Lines.

== Name ==
"Yamanote" literally refers to inland, hillier districts or foothills (as distinct from areas close to the sea). In Tokyo, "Yamanote" lies along the western side of the Yamanote Line loop. The word consists of the Japanese morphemes yama, meaning 'mountain', the genitive suffix no, and te, meaning 'hand', thus literally translating as "mountain's hand", analogous to the English term "foothills". Yamanote-sen is officially written in Japanese without the kana no (の、ノ), which makes its pronunciation ambiguous in print. The characters 山手 may also be pronounced yamate, as in Yamate-dōri (Yamate Street), which runs parallel to the west side of the Yamanote Line. The Seishin-Yamate Line in Kobe and the Yamate area of Yokohama also use this pronunciation. After World War II, SCAP ordered all train placards to be romanized, and the Yamanote Line was romanized as "Yamate Line" due to a mistake made by one of the workers at JNR. It was thus alternatively known as "Yamanote" and "Yamate" until 1971, when the Japanese National Railways changed the pronunciation back to "Yamanote", as people started riding trains heading for Yamate thinking it goes to the Yamate Station located in Yokohama. Some older people still refer to the line as the "Yamate Line".

== Station list ==
- Stations are listed in clockwise order from Shinagawa to Tabata, but for operational purposes trains officially enter and exit service at Ōsaki.
  - Clockwise (外回り, sotomawari; "outer circle"): Shinagawa → Shibuya → Shinjuku → Ikebukuro → Ueno → Tokyo → Shinagawa
  - Counter-clockwise (内回り, uchimawari; "inner circle"): Shinagawa → Tokyo → Ueno → Ikebukuro → Shinjuku → Shibuya → Shinagawa
- All stations are located in the special wards of Tokyo.
- All trains on the Yamanote Line are local trains that stop at all stations.

Line	No.	Station	Distance in km (mi)		Transfers	Location
Line	No.	Station	Between stations	Total	Transfers	Location
↑ Line loops towards Takanawa Gateway (inner circle) ↑
Yamanote		Shinagawa 品川	from Takanawa; Gateway: 0.9 (0.56)	0 (0)	Tokaido Shinkansen; Keihin–Tōhoku Line (JK20); Tōkaidō Line (JT03); Yokosuka Line (JO17); Main Line (KK01)	Minato
Yamanote		Ōsaki 大崎	2.0 (1.2)	2.0 (1.2)	Shōnan–Shinjuku Line (JS17); Saikyō Line (JA08); Rinkai Line (R08)	Shinagawa
Yamanote	JY23	Gotanda 五反田	0.9 (0.56)	2.9 (1.8)	Ikegami Line (IK01); Asakusa Line (A-05)	Shinagawa
Yamanote	JY22	Meguro 目黒	1.2 (0.75)	4.1 (2.5)	Meguro Line (MG01); Namboku Line (N-01); Mita Line (I-01)	Shinagawa
Yamanote		Ebisu 恵比寿	1.5 (0.93)	5.6 (3.5)	Shōnan–Shinjuku Line (JS18); Saikyō Line (JA09); Hibiya Line (H-02)	Shibuya
Yamanote		Shibuya 渋谷	1.6 (0.99)	7.2 (4.5)	Shōnan–Shinjuku Line (JS19); Saikyō Line (JA10); Inokashira Line (IN01); Den-en-toshi Line (DT01); Tōyoko Line (TY01); Ginza Line (G-01); Hanzōmon Line (Z-01); Fukutoshin Line (F-16)	Shibuya
Yamanote	JY19	Harajuku 原宿	1.2 (0.75)	8.4 (5.2)	Meiji-jingumae: Chiyoda Line (C-03) Fukutoshin Line (F-15)	Shibuya
Yamanote	JY18	Yoyogi 代々木	1.5 (0.93)	9.9 (6.2)	Chūō–Sōbu Line (JB11); Ōedo Line (E-26)	Shibuya
Yamanote		Shinjuku 新宿	0.7 (0.43)	10.6 (6.6)	Chūō Line (JC05); Chūō–Sōbu Line (JB10); Saikyō Line (JA11); Shōnan–Shinjuku Line (JS20); Keiō Line (KO01); Keiō New Line (KO01); Odawara Line (OH01); Marunouchi Line (M-08); Shinjuku Line (S-01); Ōedo Line (E-27, Shinjuku-nishiguchi: E-01); Shinjuku Line (Seibu-Shinjuku: SS01)	Shibuya
Yamanote		Shinjuku 新宿	0.7 (0.43)	10.6 (6.6)	Chūō Line (JC05); Chūō–Sōbu Line (JB10); Saikyō Line (JA11); Shōnan–Shinjuku Line (JS20); Keiō Line (KO01); Keiō New Line (KO01); Odawara Line (OH01); Marunouchi Line (M-08); Shinjuku Line (S-01); Ōedo Line (E-27, Shinjuku-nishiguchi: E-01); Shinjuku Line (Seibu-Shinjuku: SS01)	Shinjuku (Note: The southern half of Shinjuku Station is in Shibuya ward while the northern half is in Shinjuku ward.)
Yamanote	JY16	Shin-Ōkubo 新大久保	1.3 (0.81)	11.9 (7.4)		Shinjuku
Yamanote	JY15	Takadanobaba 高田馬場	1.4 (0.87)	13.3 (8.3)	Shinjuku Line (SS02); Tōzai Line (T-03)	Shinjuku
Yamanote	JY14	Mejiro 目白	0.9 (0.56)	14.2 (8.8)		Toshima
Yamanote		Ikebukuro 池袋	1.2 (0.75)	15.4 (9.6)	Saikyō Line (JA12); Shōnan–Shinjuku Line (JS21); Ikebukuro Line (SI01); Tojo Line (TJ01); Marunouchi Line (M-25); Yūrakuchō Line (Y-09); Fukutoshin Line (F-09)	Toshima
Yamanote	JY12	Ōtsuka 大塚	1.8 (1.1)	17.2 (10.7)	Toden Arakawa Line (Otsuka-ekimae: SA23)	Toshima
Yamanote	JY11	Sugamo 巣鴨	1.1 (0.68)	18.3 (11.4)	Mita Line (I-15)	Toshima
Yamanote	JY10	Komagome 駒込	0.7 (0.43)	19.0 (11.8)	Namboku Line (N-14)	Toshima
Yamanote	JY09	Tabata 田端	1.6 (0.99)	20.6 (12.8)	Keihin–Tōhoku Line (JK34)	Kita
Tohoku	JY09	Tabata 田端	1.6 (0.99)	20.6 (12.8)	Keihin–Tōhoku Line (JK34)	Kita
Tohoku	JY08	Nishi-Nippori 西日暮里	0.8 (0.50)	21.4 (13.3)	Keihin–Tōhoku Line (JK33); Chiyoda Line (C-16); Nippori–Toneri Liner (NT02)	Arakawa
Tohoku		Nippori 日暮里	0.5 (0.31)	21.9 (13.6)	Keihin–Tōhoku Line (JK32); Jōban Line (Rapid) (JJ02); Main Line (KS02); Nippori–Toneri Liner (NT01)	Arakawa
Tohoku	JY06	Uguisudani 鶯谷	1.1 (0.68)	23.0 (14.3)	Keihin–Tōhoku Line (JK31)	Taitō
Tohoku		Ueno 上野	1.1 (0.68)	24.1 (15.0)	Tōhoku Shinkansen (Hokkaido, Akita, Yamagata); Jōetsu Shinkansen; Hokuriku Shinkansen; Keihin–Tōhoku Line (JK30); Jōban Line (Rapid) (JJ01); Utsunomiya Line/Takasaki Line (JU02); Ueno–Tokyo Line (JU02); Ginza Line (G-16); Hibiya Line (H-18); Main Line (Keisei Ueno: KS01)	Taitō
Tohoku	JY04	Okachimachi 御徒町	0.6 (0.37)	24.7 (15.3)	Keihin–Tōhoku Line (JK29) (Note: Stops on weekends and national holidays only.); Ōedo Line (Ueno-okachimachi: E-09); Ginza Line (Ueno-hirokoji: G-15); Hibiya Line (Naka-okachimachi: H-17)	Taitō
Tohoku		Akihabara 秋葉原	1.0 (0.62)	25.7 (16.0)	Keihin–Tōhoku Line (JK28); Chūō–Sōbu Line (JB19); Tsukuba Express (TX01); Hibiya Line (H-16); Shinjuku Line (Iwamotocho: S-08)	Chiyoda
Tohoku		Kanda 神田	0.7 (0.43)	26.4 (16.4)	Keihin–Tōhoku Line (JK27); Chūō Line (JC02); Ginza Line (G-13)	Chiyoda
Tohoku		Tokyo 東京	1.3 (0.81)	27.7 (17.2)	Tokaido Shinkansen; Tōhoku Shinkansen (Hokkaido, Akita, Yamagata); Jōetsu Shinkansen; Hokuriku Shinkansen; Keihin–Tōhoku Line (JK26); Chūō Line (JC01); Tōkaidō Line (JT01); Ueno-Tokyo Line (JU01); Yokosuka Line/Sobu Line (Rapid) (JO19); Keiyō Line (JE01); Marunouchi Line (M-17); Tōzai Line (Ōtemachi: T-09); Chiyoda Line (Nijubashimae: C-10, Ōtemachi: C-11); Hanzōmon Line (Otemachi: Z-08); Mita Line (Otemachi: I-09)	Chiyoda
Tokaido		Tokyo 東京	1.3 (0.81)	27.7 (17.2)		Chiyoda
Tokaido	JY30	Yūrakuchō 有楽町	0.8 (0.50)	28.5 (17.7)	Keihin–Tōhoku Line (JK25); Yūrakuchō Line (Y-18); Hibiya Line (Hibiya: H-08); Chiyoda Line (Hibiya: C-09); Mita Line (Hibiya: I-08)	Chiyoda
Tokaido		Shimbashi 新橋	1.1 (0.68)	29.6 (18.4)	Keihin–Tōhoku Line (JK24); Tōkaidō Line (JT02); Yokosuka Line (JO18); Ginza Line (G-08); Asakusa Line (A-10); Yurikamome (U-01)	Minato
Tokaido		Hamamatsuchō 浜松町	1.2 (0.75)	30.8 (19.1)	Keihin–Tōhoku Line (JK23); Haneda Airport Line (MO01); Asakusa Line (Daimon: A-09); Ōedo Line (Daimon: E-20)	Minato
Tokaido	JY27	Tamachi 田町	1.5 (0.93)	32.3 (20.1)	Keihin–Tōhoku Line (JK22); Asakusa Line (Mita: A-08); Mita Line (Mita: I-04)	Minato
Tokaido		Takanawa Gateway 高輪ゲートウェイ	1.3 (0.81)	33.6 (20.9)	Keihin–Tōhoku Line (JK21); Asakusa Line (Sengakuji: A-07); Main Line (Sengakuji: A-07)	Minato
↓ Line loops towards Shinagawa (outer circle) ↓

== Rolling stock ==
As of January 2020, the line's services are operated exclusively by a fleet of 50 11-car E235 series EMUs, the first of which was introduced on the line on 30 November 2015. However, a number of technical faults, including problems with door close indicators, resulted in the train being taken out of service the same day. The E235 series returned to service on the Yamanote Line on 7 March 2016. All Yamanote Line rolling stock are stored and maintained at Tokyo General Rolling Stock Centre near Ōsaki Station.

=== Former rolling stock ===
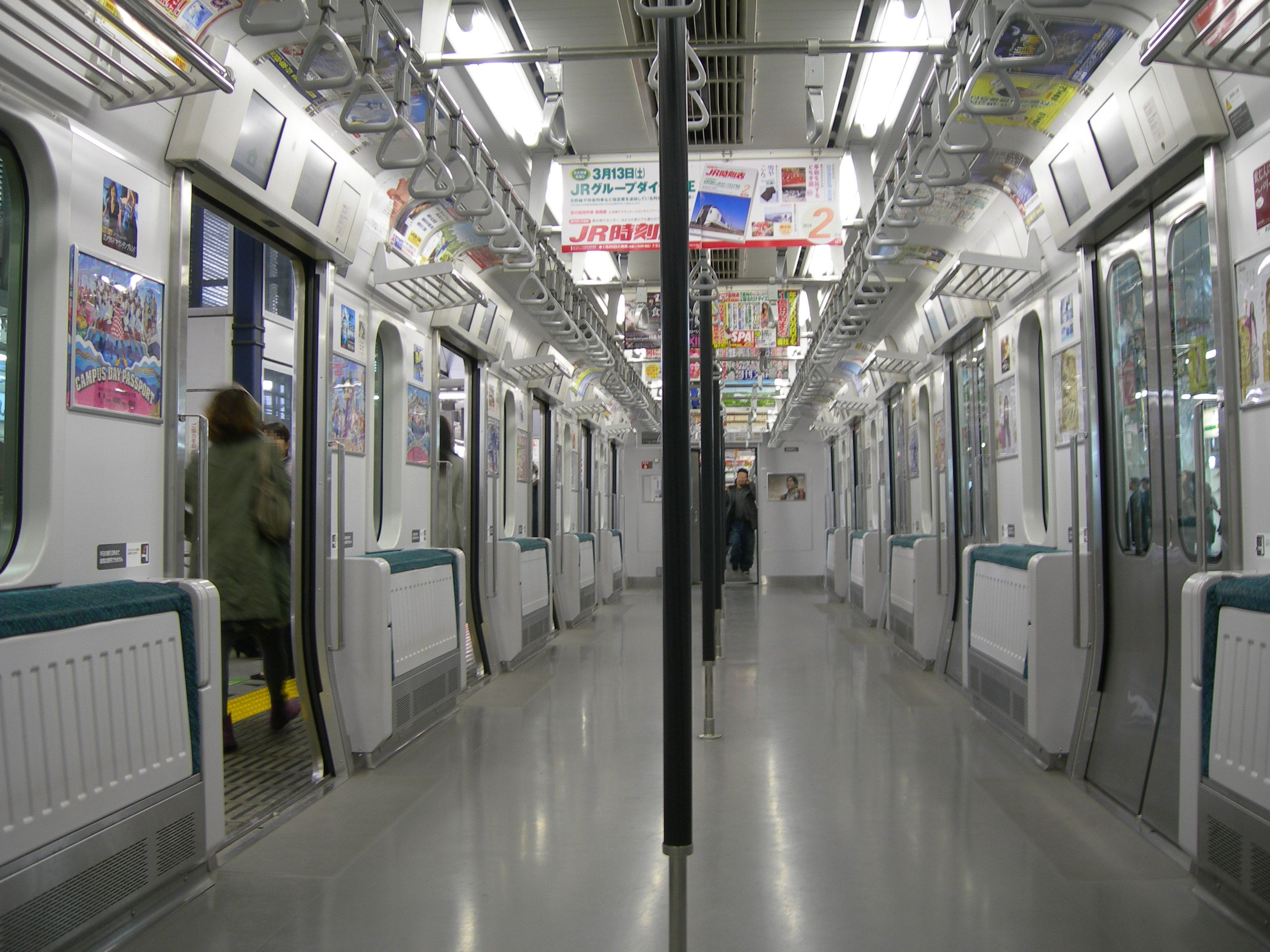
Former E231-500 series 6-door car with the seats folded up, January 2010

Prior to the E235 series, the line's services were operated by E231-500 series EMUs, which were in use from April 21, 2002 to January 20, 2020. These trains originally each included two "six-door cars" with six pairs of doors per side and bench seats that were folded up to provide standing room only during the morning peak until 10 a.m. From February 22, 2010, the seats were no longer folded up during the morning peak, and all trains were standardized with newly built four-door cars by 31 August 2011. This was due to reduced congestion on the line as well as preparation for the installation of platform doors on all stations by 2017.

The E231 series supported a new type of traffic control system, called digital Automatic Train Control (D-ATC). The series also had a more modern design and has two 15-inch LCD monitors above each door, one of which is used for displaying silent commercials, news and weather; and another which is used for displaying information on the next stop (in Japanese, English, Korean and more) along with notification of delays on Shinkansen and other railway lines in the greater Tokyo area.

A train on the Yamanote Line arriving and departing Harajuku Station and on the tracks near Ebisu Station, 2023

- DeHo 6100 series (from 1909 until unknown date)
- MoHa 10
- 63 series
- 72 series
- 101 series ("Canary" yellow livery, from September 1961 until circa 1968)
- 103 series ("Uguisu" green livery, from December 1963 until June 26, 1988)
- 205 series (from March 25, 1985 until April 17, 2005)
- E231-500 series (from April 21, 2002 until January 20, 2020)
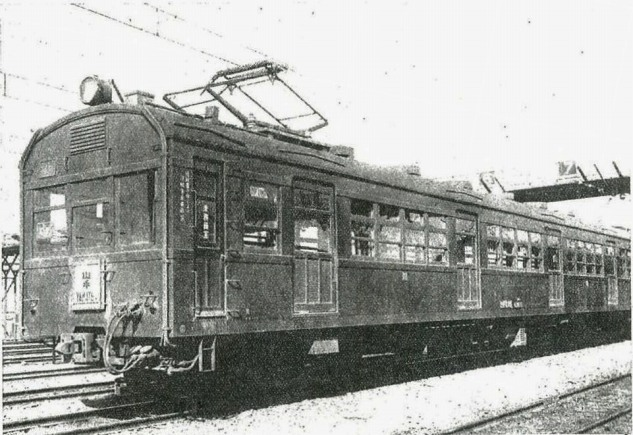
63 series train

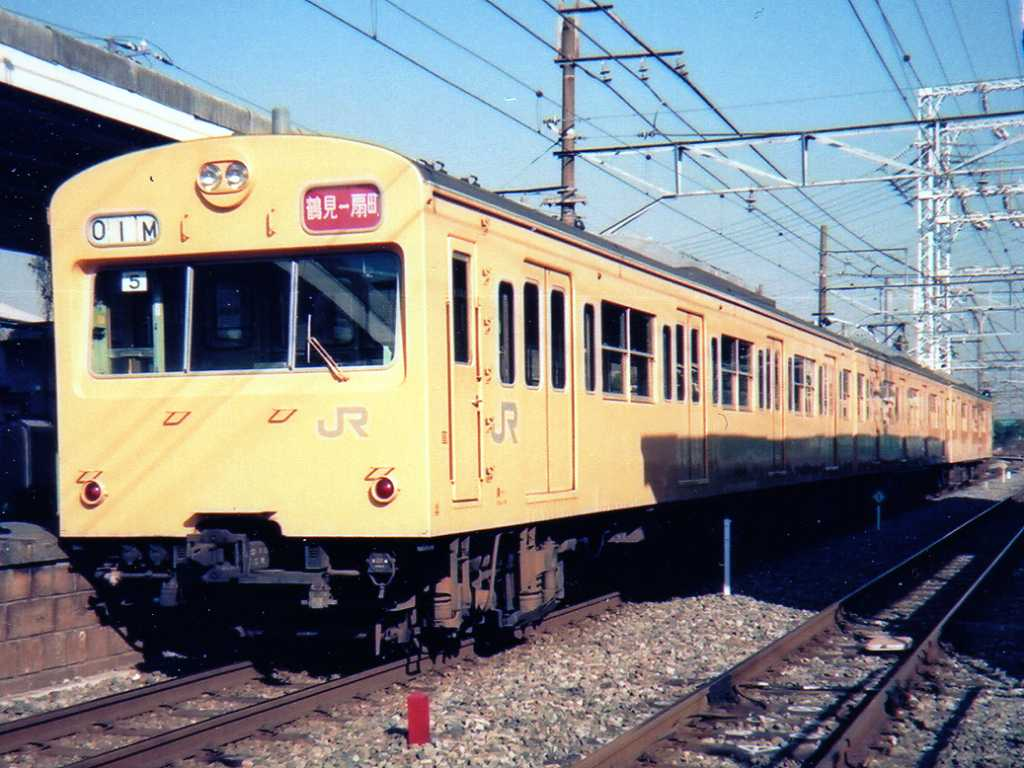
101 series train

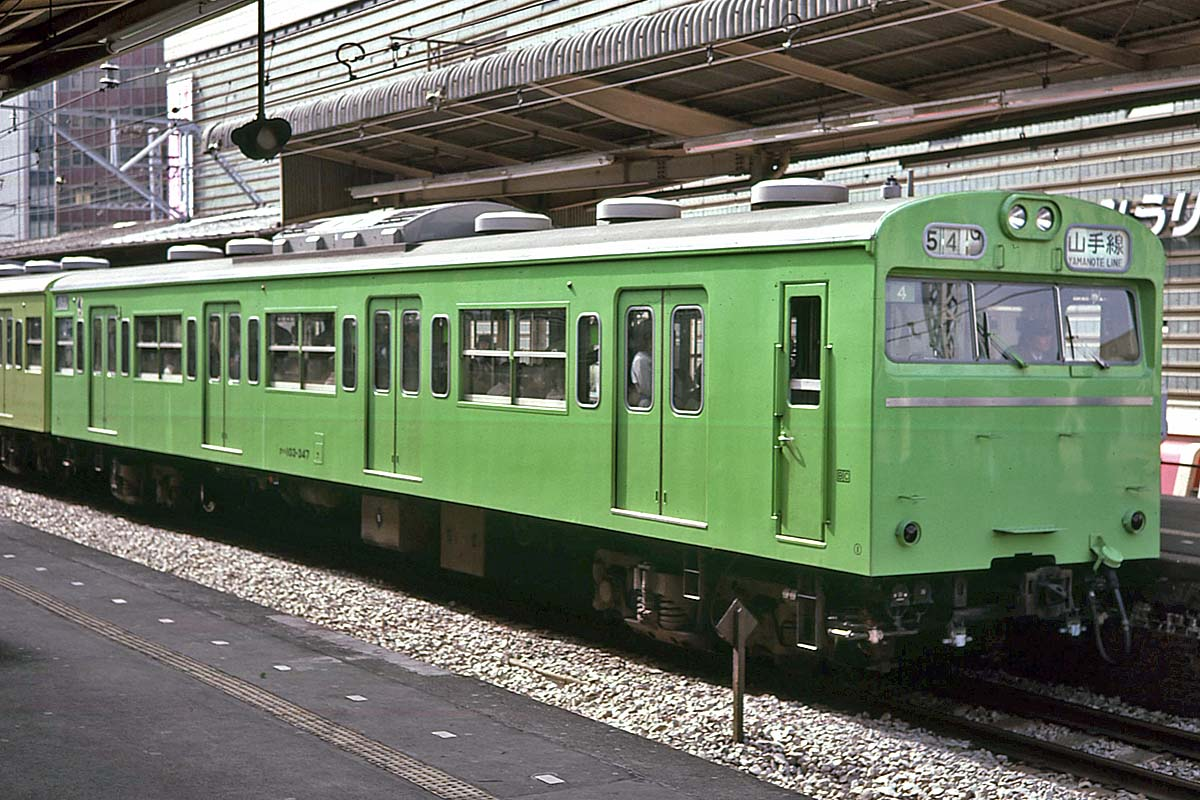
103 series train in March 1985

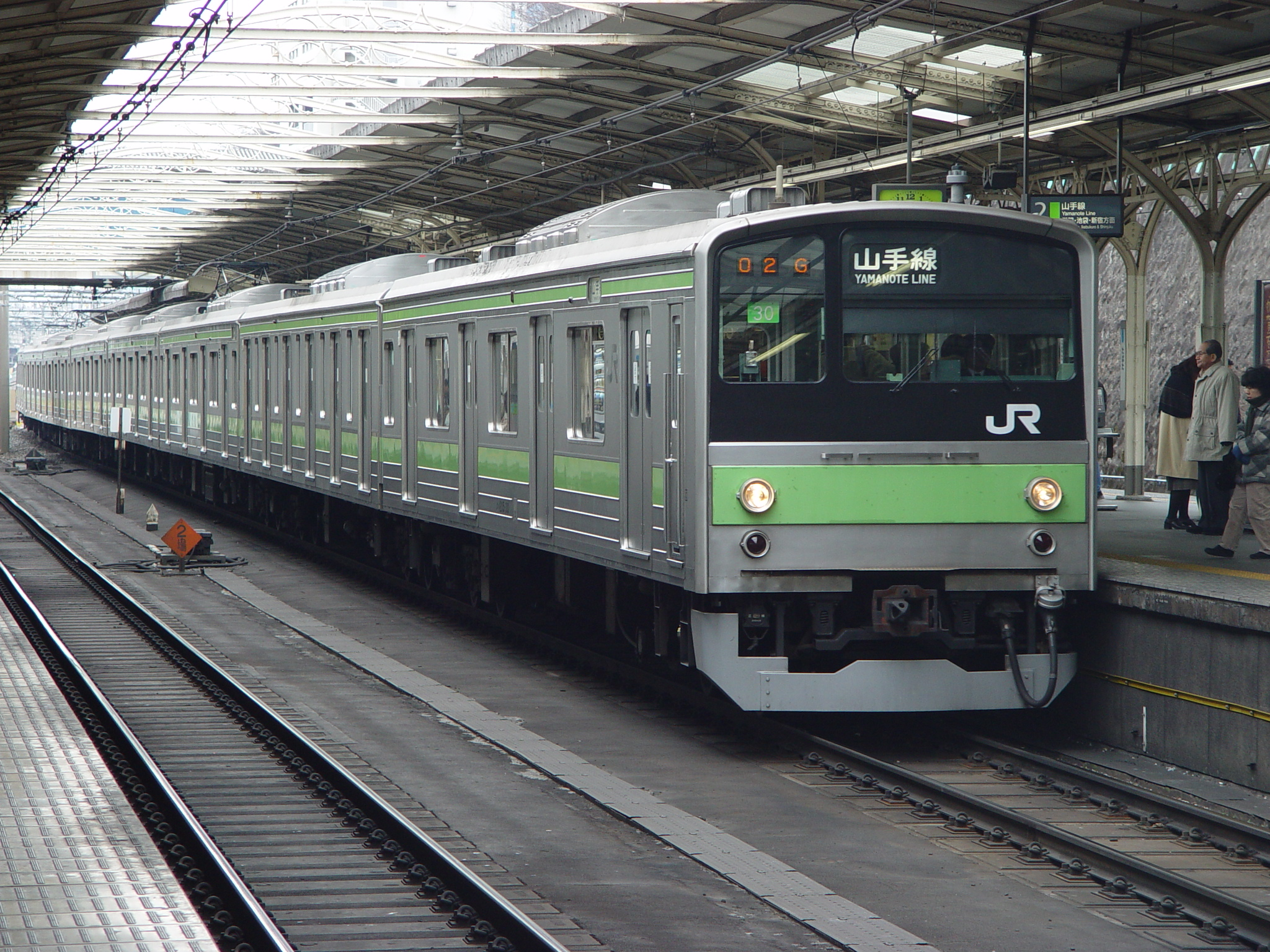
205 series train in February 2003

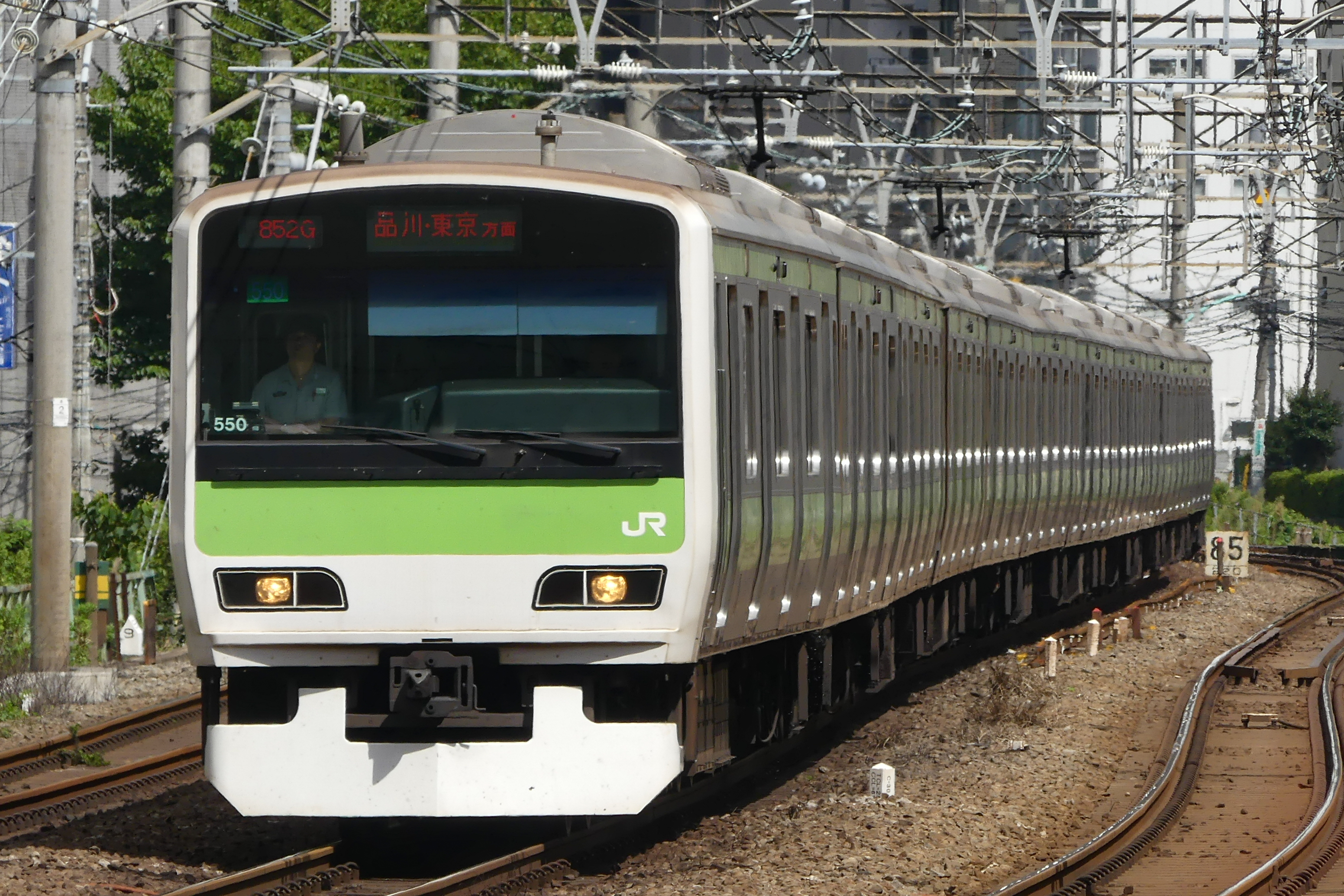
E231-500 series train in August 2018

=== Timeline ===
101 series
103 series
205 series
E231-500 series
E235 series
│
1960
│
1965
│
1970
│
1975
│
1980
│
1985
│
1990
│
1995
│
2000
│
2005
│
2010
│
2015
│
2020
│
2025
Rolling stock transitions since 1960

== History ==
The construction of the Yamanote Line and current JR lines

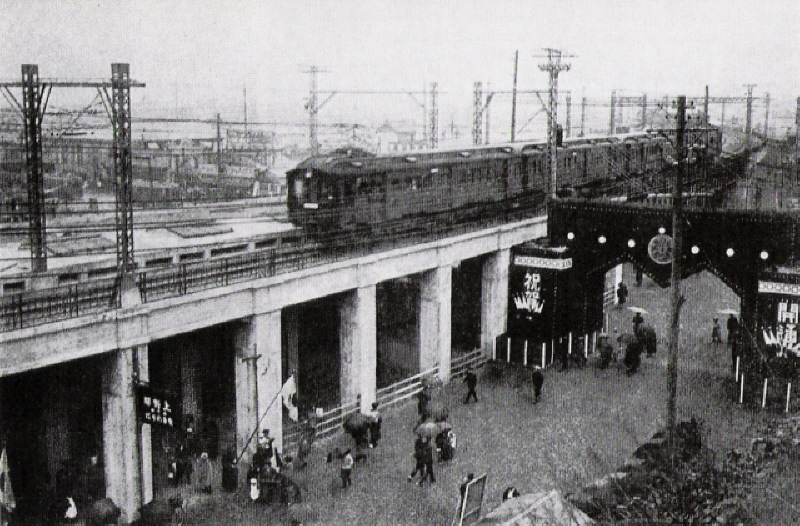
The Yamanote Line in 1925

The predecessor of the present-day Yamanote Line was opened on 1 March 1885 by the Nippon Railway Company, operating between Shinagawa Station in the south and Akabane Station in the north. The top part of the loop between Ikebukuro and Tabata (a distance of 3.3 km (2.1 mi)) opened on 1 April 1903, and both lines were merged to become the Yamanote Line on 12 October 1909.

The line was electrified on December 16, 1909, soon after the Osaki – Shinagawa section was double-tracked on November 30. The loop was completed in 1925 with the opening of the double track, electrified section between Kanda and Ueno on 1 November, providing a north–south link via Tokyo Station through the city's business centre. A parallel freight line, also completed in 1925, ran along the inner side of the loop between Shinagawa and Tabata.

During the prewar era, the Ministry of Railways did not issue permits to private suburban railway companies for new lines to cross the Yamanote Line from their terminal stations to the central districts of Tokyo, forcing the companies to terminate services at stations on the line. This policy led to the development of new urban centers (新都心、副都心, shintoshin, fukutoshin) around major transfer points on the Yamanote Line, most notably at Shinjuku and Ikebukuro (which are now the two busiest passenger railway stations in the world).

The contemporary Yamanote Line came into being on 19 November 1956 when it was separated from the Keihin-Tōhoku Line and given its own set of tracks along the eastern side of the loop between Shinagawa and Tabata. However, Yamanote Line trains continued to periodically use the Keihin-Tōhoku tracks, particularly on holidays and during off-peak hours, until rapid service trains were introduced on the Keihin-Tōhoku Line in 1988.

A major explosion on the Yamanote Freight Line in Shinjuku in 1967 led to the diversion of freight traffic to the more distant Musashino Line. To address severe undercapacity, the freight line was repurposed for use by Saikyō Line and Shōnan-Shinjuku Line trains, as well as certain limited express trains such as the Narita Express and some liner services. Likewise, from 14 March 2015 onwards, the Ueno-Tokyo Line starts services, which connects the Tōhoku Main Line and Jōban Line to the Tōkaidō Main Line, to provide further relief on the busiest portion of the Yamanote Line today, the segment between Ueno and Tokyo stations.

Automatic train control (ATC) was introduced from 6 December 1981, and digital ATC (D-ATC) was introduced from 30 July 2006.

Station numbering was introduced on JR East stations in the Tokyo area from 20 August 2016, with Yamanote Line stations numbered using the prefix "JY".

A new station, Takanawa Gateway Station, opened on 14 March 2020. This station was built on the Yamanote Line and Keihin-Tohoku Line between Shinagawa and Tamachi stations, becoming the first new station on the line since Nishi-Nippori was built in 1971. The distance between Shinagawa and Tamachi stations was 2.2 km (1.4 mi), making it the longest stretch of track between stations on the Yamanote Line. The new station was constructed on top of the 20-hectare former railyard, which is undergoing rationalization and redevelopment by JR East; it is roughly parallel to the existing Sengakuji Station on the Toei Asakusa and Keikyu Main lines. The Yamanote Line and the Keihin-Tohoku Line tracks were moved slightly to the east to be aligned closer to the Tokaido Shinkansen tracks. The area on the west side of the yard made available will be redeveloped with high-rise office buildings, creating an international business center with good connections to the Shinkansen and Haneda Airport.

In October 2022, JR East began trial runs for driverless trains on the line, which is aimed to begin sometime in 2028. Two sets, 17 and 18, were fitted with the new system and re-entered service on the line as train crew conduct ongoing tests on their performance. Furthermore, the two sets are easy to distinguish with an "ATO" (Automatic Train Operation) sticker located on the front and sides of each set. Once ATO is fully installed, this will be the first line of JR East to feature driverless trains.

In August 2025, JR East announced that it obtained government approval to raise fare by an average 7.1% from March 2026, which was the first blanket fare hike since 1987.

On 16 September 2025, JR East announced that it would be operating a pair of E235 series trainsets with a special design commemorating 100 years since the opening of the existing Yamanote Line loop route. The design will pay tribute to former 103 series and 205 series that formerly operated on the line.

JR East is currently considering plans to run a new "Yamanote Rapid Service" beginning in fiscal year 2030. This new service would see trains stop only at major transfer stations of Tokyo, Shinagawa, Shibuya, Shinjuku, Ikebukuro, Ueno, and Akihabara. It is hoped that this new service could help to ease congestion on the line especially from passengers with luggage transferring to and from long distance express and Shinkansen trains.

== See also ==
- Osaka Loop Line, a similar loop line serving Central Osaka.
- Musashino Line, a line regarded by JR East as part of the Tokyo Mega Loop.
- Meijō Line, a line on the Nagoya Municipal Subway that goes around the city.
- Pink Line, a line in Delhi Metro that is currently India's longest and India's first and only operational loop line.
- Circle line, a line on the London Underground that goes around the center of London.
- Seoul Subway Line 2, a line on the Seoul Subway that goes around the center of Seoul.
- Circle Line (Singapore), a line on the Singapore MRT that runs mostly within the Central Region
- Line 10 (Beijing Subway), the world's second longest subway loop line.
- Ringbahn (Ring Railway) in Berlin.
- Circle route, the category of the Yamanote line.

== Notes ==
a. Crowding levels defined by the Ministry of Land, Infrastructure, Transport and Tourism:

100% — Commuters have enough personal space and are able to take a seat or stand while holding onto the straps or hand rails.
150% — Commuters have enough personal space to read a newspaper.
180% — Commuters must fold newspapers to read.
200% — Commuters are pressed against each other in each compartment but can still read small magazines.
250% — Commuters are pressed against each other, unable to move.

b. Ridership of the section between Shinagawa-Tabata (via Shinjuku) including ridership from the Saikyō and Shōnan-Shinjuku services operating through this section. Ridership in the report estimated from OD surveys and commuter pass data. 「平均通過人員」or average passenger intensity is defined by JR East as Annual passenger-kilometre / route length / number of workdays per year.
