= Takanawa Great Wooden Gate =

- 高輪大木戸 (Japanese)
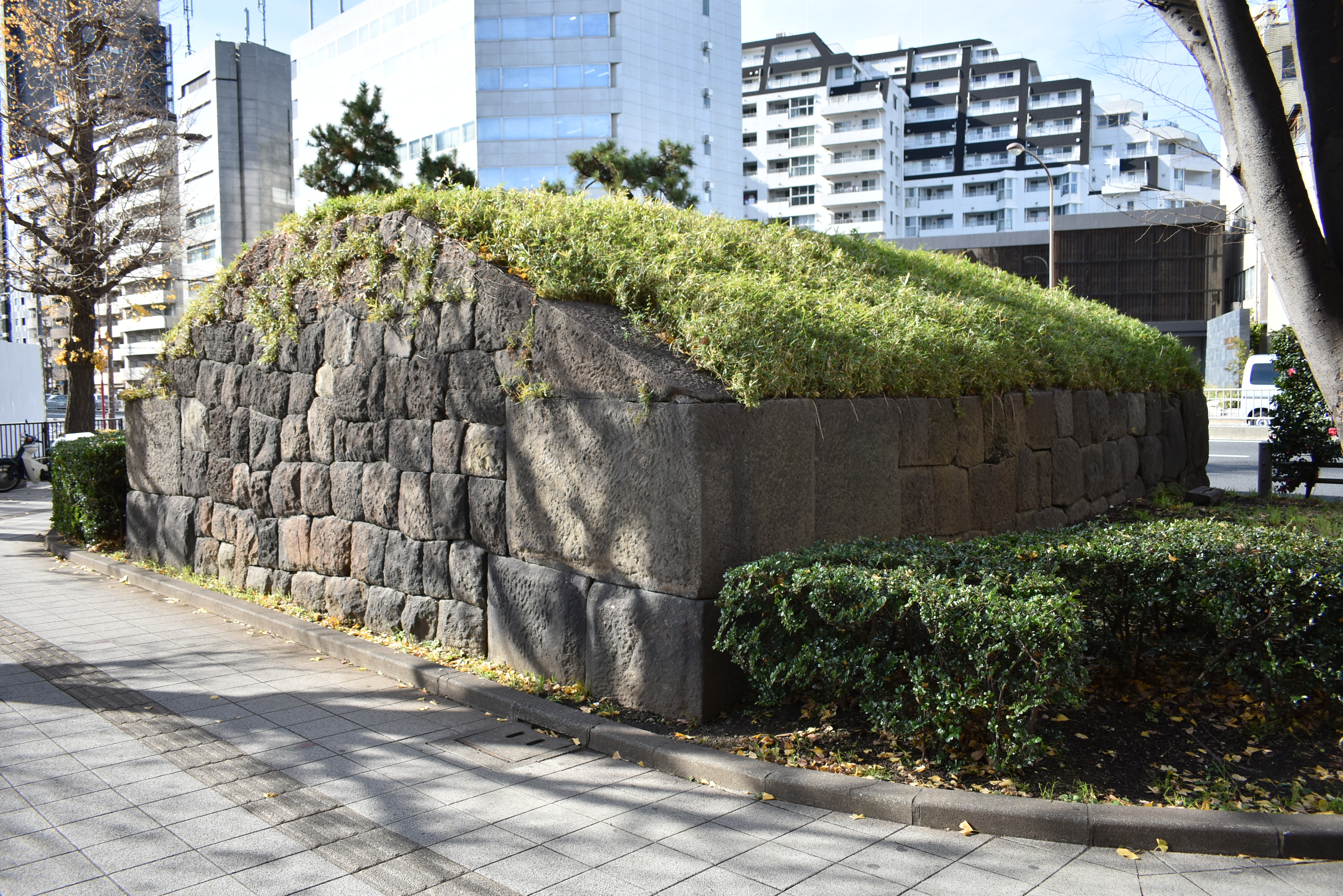

- Takanawa Great Wooden Gate Takanawa Great Wooden Gate (Japan)
- 35°38′22″N 139°44′26″E
- Periods: Edo period
- Location: Takanawa, Minato, Tokyo, Japan
- Region: Kantō region

Site notes
- Public access: Yes

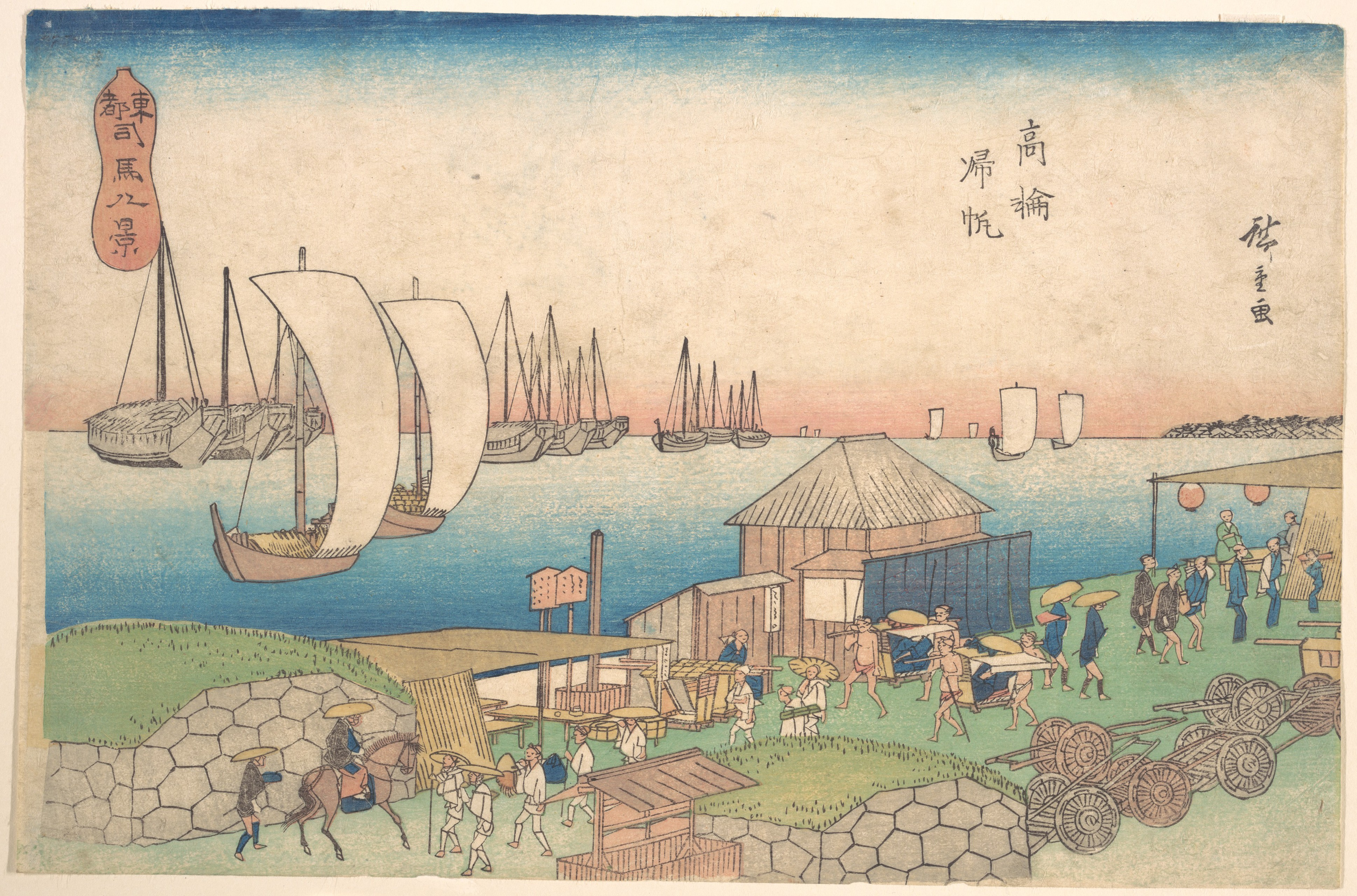
Ukiyoe print by Hiroshige showing site of the Takanawa Gate

The Takanawa Great Wooden Gate (高輪大木戸跡, Takanawa ōkido ato) was a wooden gate and checkpoint established by the Tokugawa Shogunate in Edo period Japan to control travel on the Tōkaidō highway and to mark the official entrance to then city of Edo, located in what is now Takanawa, Minato, Tokyo. The gate no longer exists, but the site received protection as a National Historic Site in 1928.

== Overview ==
The Takanawa Gate was located on the northeast side of the Sengakuji intersection on Japan National Route 15. Initially, the main entrance to Edo was built in 1616 at Shibaguchi, near what is now Hamamatsucho Station; however, as the city rapidly expanded, the gate was moved 700 meters to the south, just outside Shinagawa-juku. The new structure was completed in 1710. The wooden gate was set up between earthen ramparts measuring nine meters wide by 7.2 meters thick by three meters high, and was painted black. The gate itself was abolished during the latter half of the Edo period, although the security checkpoint remained to enforce the Shogun's regulations that no weapons be permitted into Edo, and no women were permitted to leave, without official permission. The gate was opened at dawn and closed at dusk. Inō Tadataka, famed for his maps of Japan, used this location as the base point for his surveys. The stone wall on the west side was removed in the first year of the Meiji period, and now only the stone wall on the east side remains.

The site is marked by a monument, and is short walk from the A4 exit of Sengakuji Station on the Toei Asakusa Line. On March 14, 2020 Takanawa Gateway Station on the JR East Yamanote Line opened nearby.

== See also ==
- List of Historic Sites of Japan (Tōkyō)
