= Tamachi =

City in Tokyo

Coordinates: 35°38′28″N 139°44′03″E

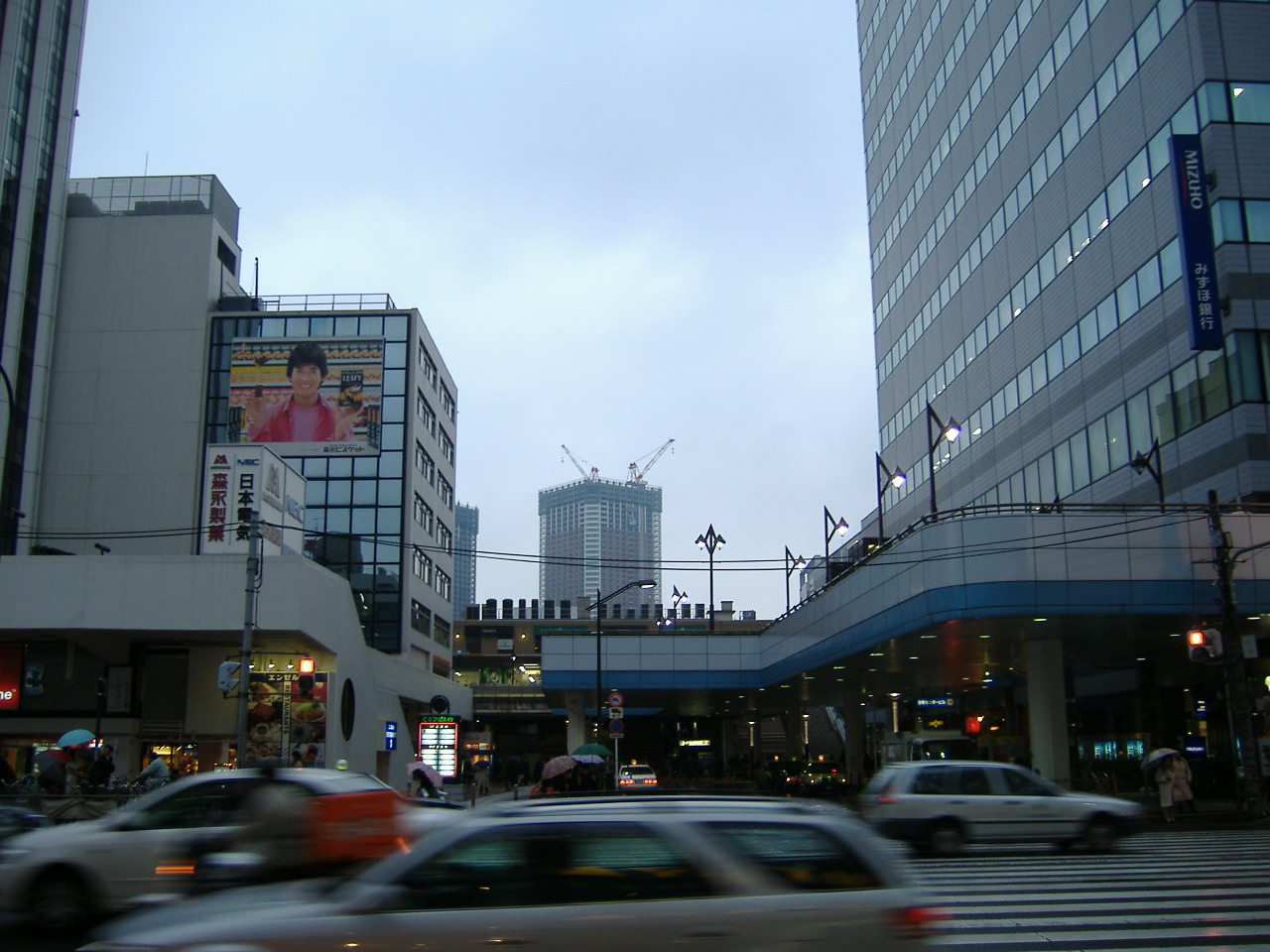
Tamachi Station

Tamachi (田町) is the informal name for the area surrounding Tamachi Station in Minato, Tokyo, generally referring to the districts of Shiba, Shibaura, and Mita.

== History ==
During the Edo period Tamachi was a hatamoto residential quarter. Rice cultivation did not begin in the area until the Meiji period. Today the area is entirely urbanized.

== Surroundings ==
The headquarters of several major companies and organizations are located in this area, including Nippon Kinzoku, Morinaga, and NEC. Also in this area is Tokyo International School. The landmark Rainbow Bridge can be accessed on foot, 15-minutes from Tamachi station crossing some scenic canals in the process.

== See also ==
- Tsuki no Misaki
