= Tabata Station (Tokyo) =

Railway station in Tokyo, Japan

JY09 JK34 Tabata Station 田端駅
- The north exit in 2026

General information
- Location: 1 Tabata; Kita, Tokyo; Japan
- Coordinates: 35°44′16″N 139°45′41″E
- Operator: JR East
- Line: Tōhoku Main Line
- Platforms: 2 island platforms
- Tracks: 4
- Connections: Bus terminal

Construction
- Structure type: At-grade

Other information
- Station code: JK34; JY09

History
- Opened: 1 April 1896; 130 years ago

Passengers
- FY2024: 80,958 (daily)

Services
Preceding station	JR East	Following station
Komagome JY10 Next counter-clockwise	Yamanote Line	Nishi-Nippori JY08 Next clockwise
Kami-Nakazato JK35 towards Ōmiya	Keihin–Tōhoku Line Rapid	Ueno towards Yokohama
Kami-Nakazato JK35 towards Ōmiya	Keihin–Tōhoku Line Local	Nishi-Nippori JK33 towards Yokohama
Location
- Location within Tokyo Yamanote Loop Location within Tokyo wards area Location within Japan

Tabata Station (Japanese: 田端駅, Hepburn: Tabata-eki) is a railway station in Kita, Tokyo, Japan, operated by East Japan Railway Company (JR East). Tabata Station is on the Tōhoku Main Line and is served by the circular Yamanote Line trains and the local and rapid trains of the Keihin–Tōhoku Line.

== Station layout ==
The station consists of two island platforms serving four tracks, with the Yamanote Line tracks on the inside, and Keihin-Tōhoku Line tracks on the outside, enabling cross-platform interchange between the two lines. There is a north exit and a south exit from the station.

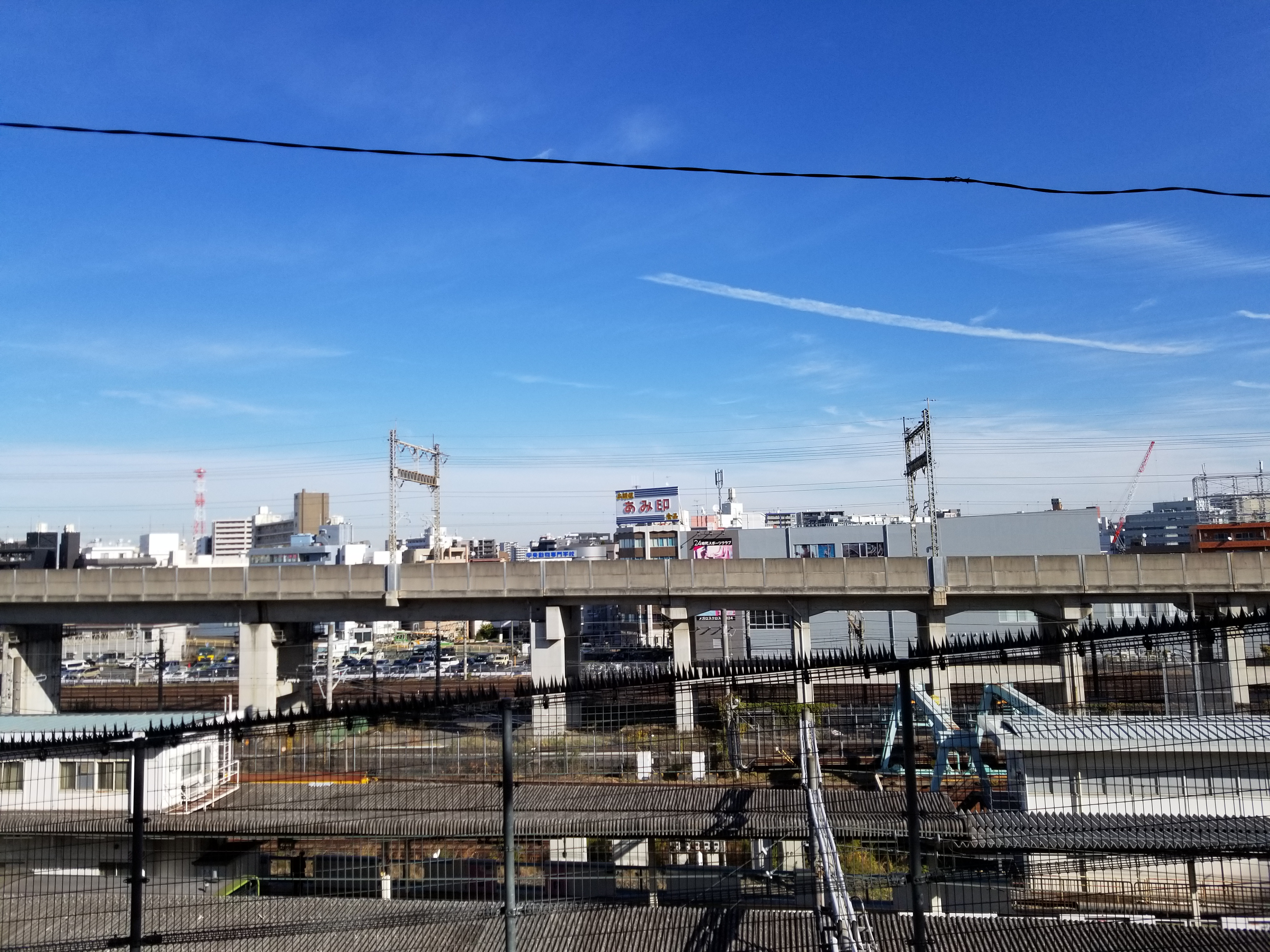
View of the tracks from the south exit

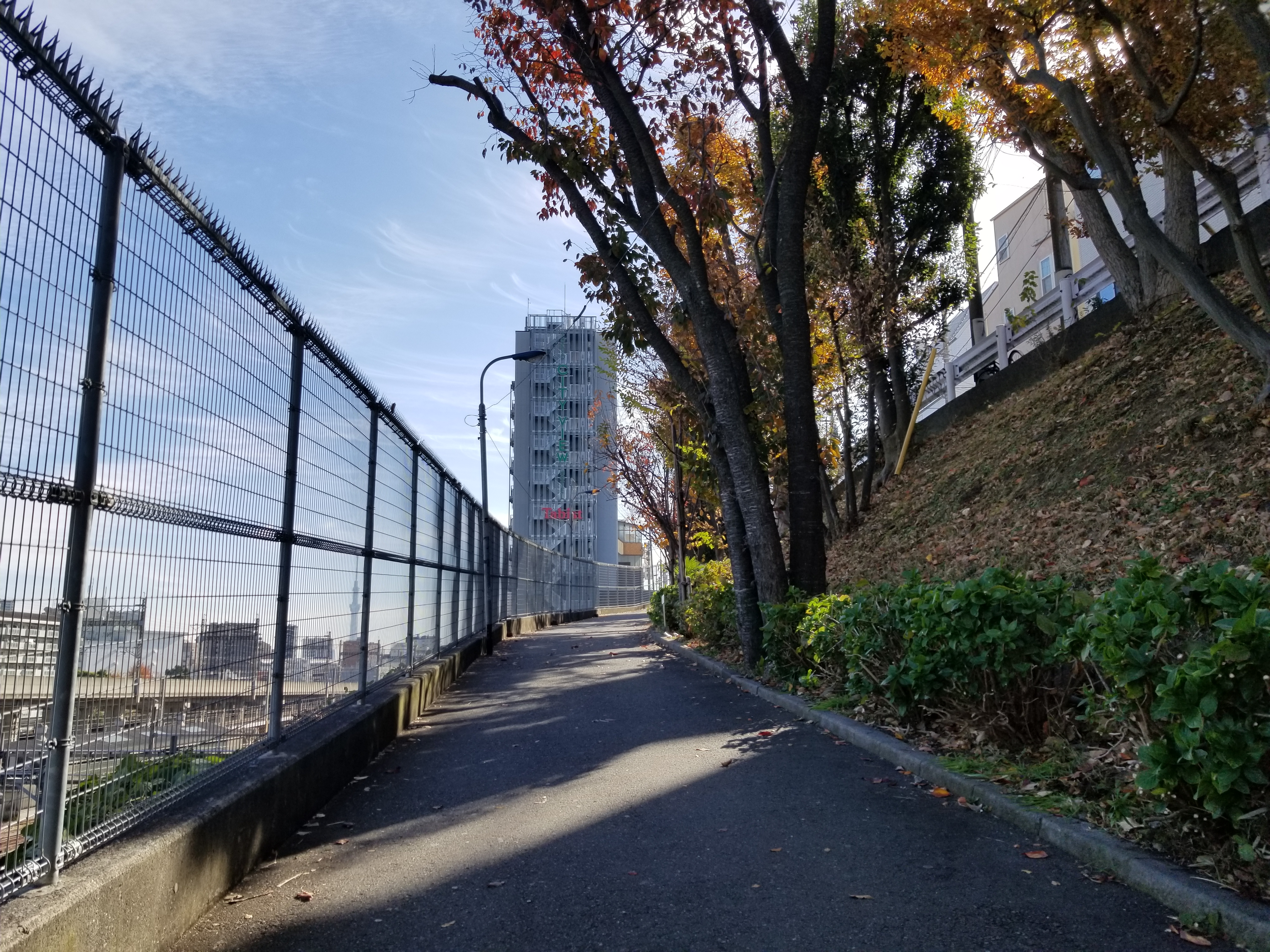
Pedestrian path immediately after leaving through the south exit

=== Platforms ===
1	Keihin-Tōhoku Line	for Akabane, Urawa, and Omiya
2	Yamanote Line	for Ikebukuro and Shinjuku (Anti-clockwise)
3	Yamanote Line	for Ueno, Tokyo, and Shinagawa (Clockwise)
4	Keihin-Tōhoku Line	for Ueno, Tokyo, and Yokohama

Chest-high platform edge doors were installed on the Yamanote Line platforms in January 2015, with operation commencing in February.

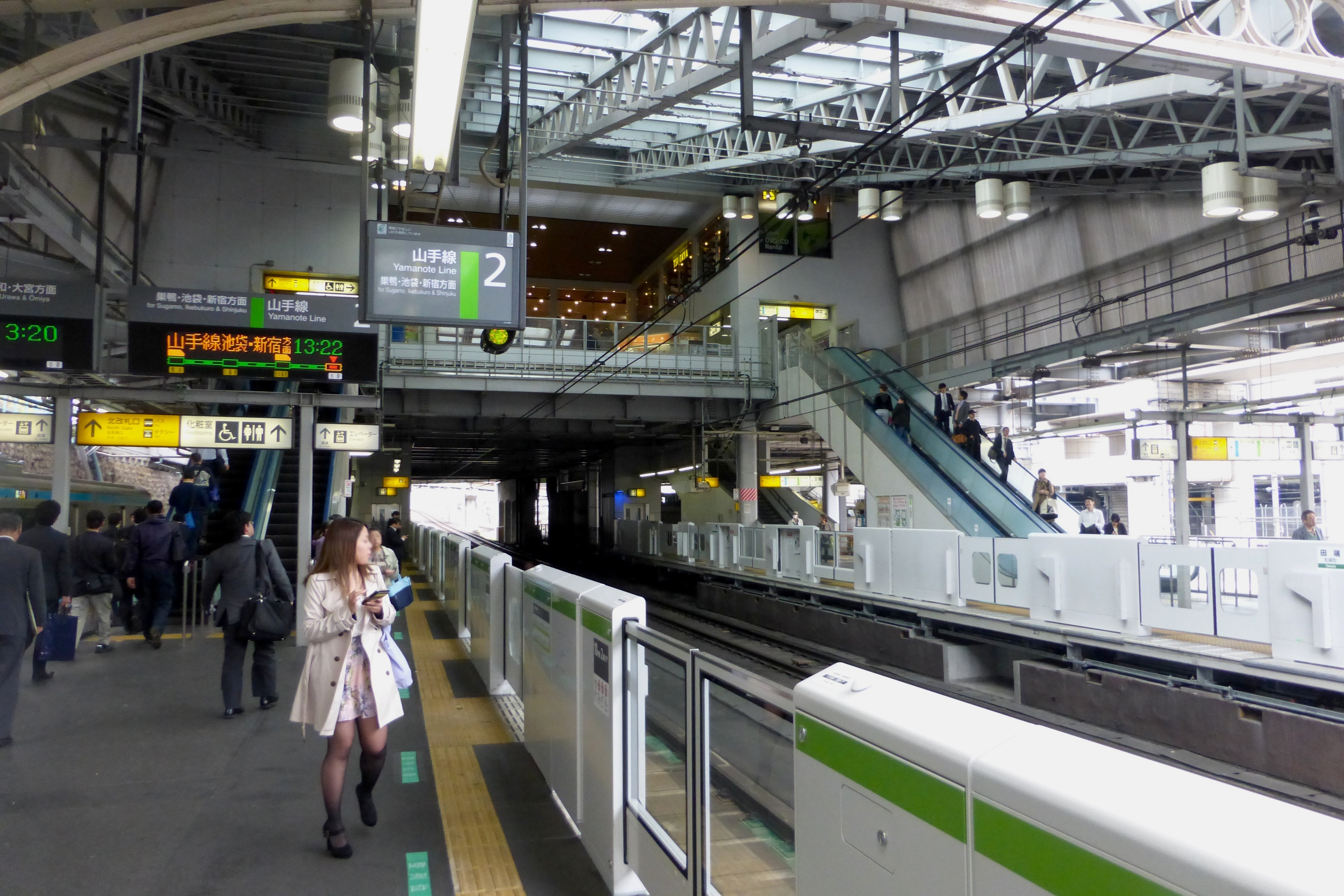
View of the platforms looking northward

== History ==
Tabata Station opened on 1 April 1896. With the privatization of JNR on 1 April 1987, the station came under the control of JR East. The station was rebuilt between 2005 and August 2008.

Station numbering was introduced in 2016 with Tabata being assigned station numbers JY09 for the Yamanote line and JK34 for the Keihin-Tōhoku line.

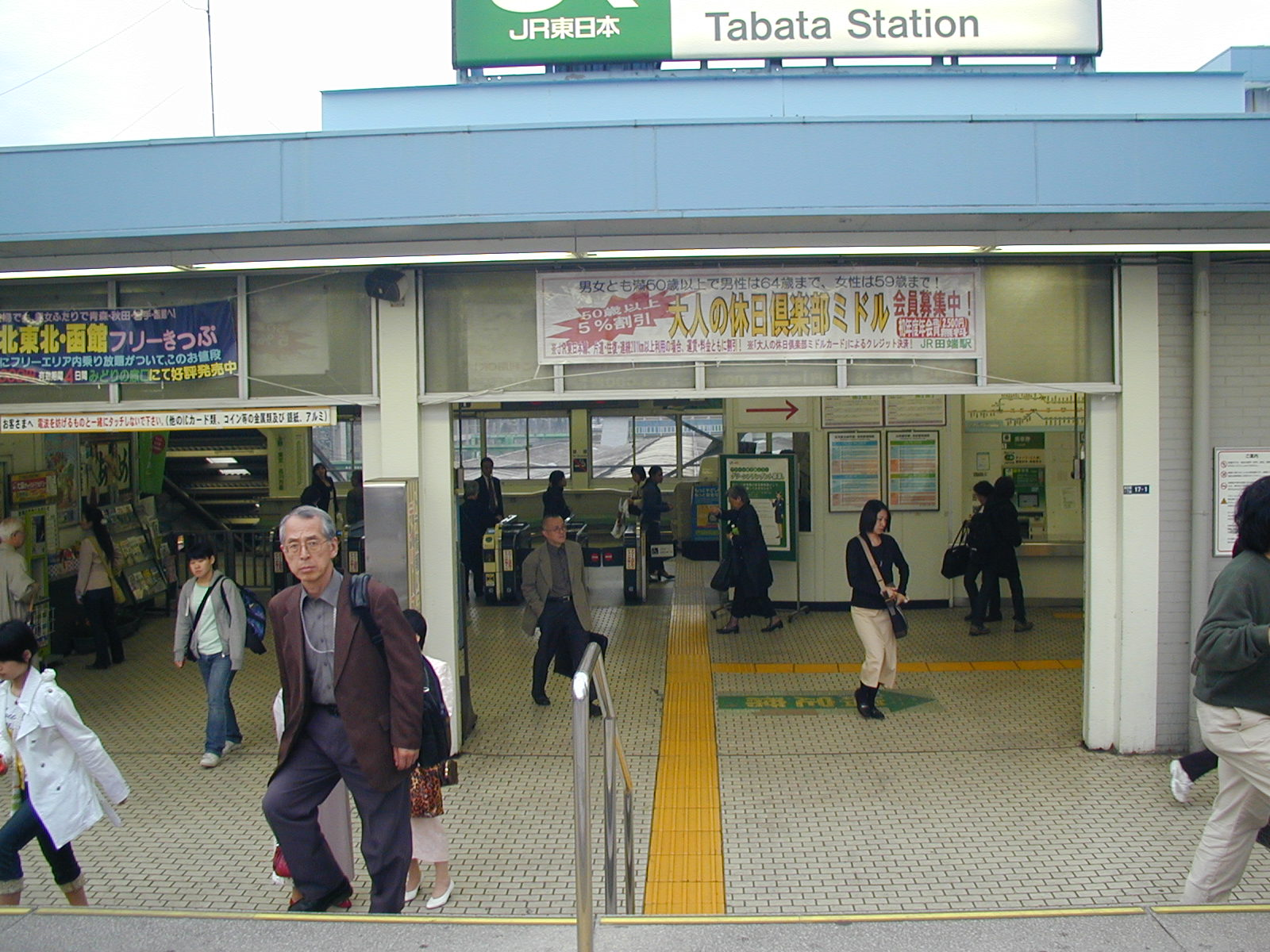
North exit circa 2005 before being rebuilt.

== Passenger statistics ==
In fiscal 2013, the station was used by an average of 45,116 passengers daily (boarding passengers only), making it the 98th busiest station on the JR East network. The passenger figures for previous years are as shown below.

Fiscal year	Daily average
2000	36,555
2005	41,400
2010	43,208
2013	45,116

== Surrounding area ==
- Tabata Memorial Museum of Writers and Artists
- Tokyo Women's Medical University

== See also ==
- List of railway stations in Japan
