= Takanawa Gateway Station =

Railway station in Tokyo, Japan

TGWJK21 JY26 Takanawa Gateway Station 高輪ゲートウェイ駅
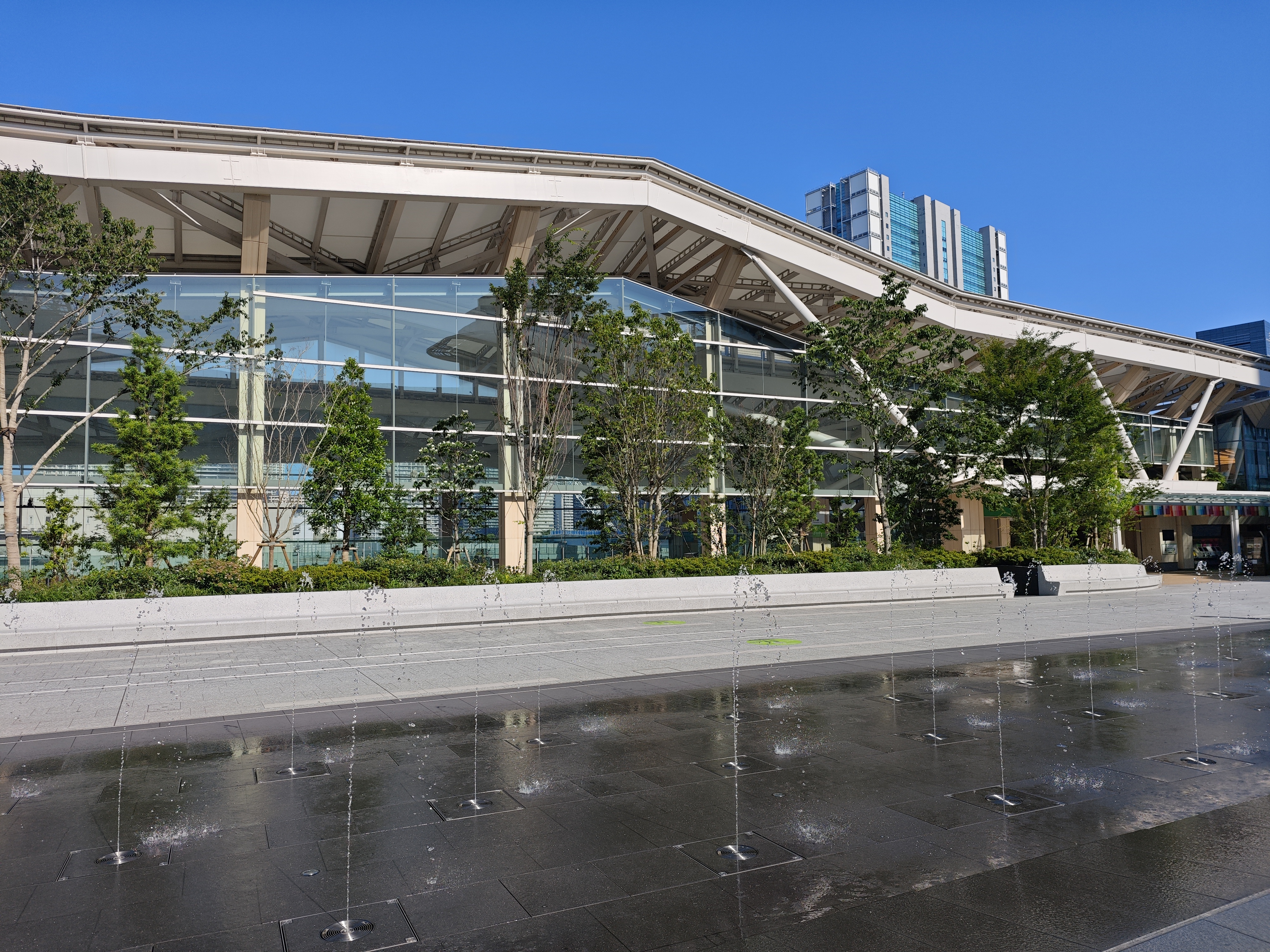
- Takanawa Gateway Station

General information
- Location: Minato-ku, Tokyo; Japan
- Coordinates: 35.636389°N 139.741389°E
- Operator: JR East
- Lines: Yamanote Line, Keihin-Tōhoku Line
- Platforms: 2 island platforms
- Tracks: 4
- Connections: Sengakuji Station

History
- Opened: 14 March 2020

Passengers
- FY2024: 28,418 (daily)

Services
Preceding station	JR East	Following station
Shinagawa Next clockwise	Yamanote Line	Tamachi JY27 Next counter-clockwise
Shinagawa towards Yokohama	Keihin–Tōhoku Line Rapid Local	Tamachi JK22 towards Ōmiya
Location
- Location within Tokyo Yamanote Loop Location within Tokyo wards area Location within Japan

Takanawa Gateway Station (高輪ゲートウェイ駅, Takanawa Gētowei-eki) is a railway station in Minato, Tokyo, Japan. The station is operated by the East Japan Railway Company (JR East). It is the newest station on both the Yamanote and Keihin–Tōhoku Lines, and the only Yamanote Line station opened in the 21st century.

Inside and outside Takanawa Gateway Station, shortly after opening in 2020.

The station is also accessible from the Toei Asakusa Line and the Keikyū Main Line via the nearby Sengakuji Station. It is located adjacent to the Takanawa neighborhood of Minato Ward.

== Lines ==
The station is served by the Yamanote Line, which circles around central Tokyo, and the Keihin–Tōhoku Line, which runs from Saitama through Tokyo to Yokohama.

Formally, the station lies on the Tokaidō Main Line. The station is within the Tokyo Metropolitan District fare zone (東京都区内).

== Station layout ==
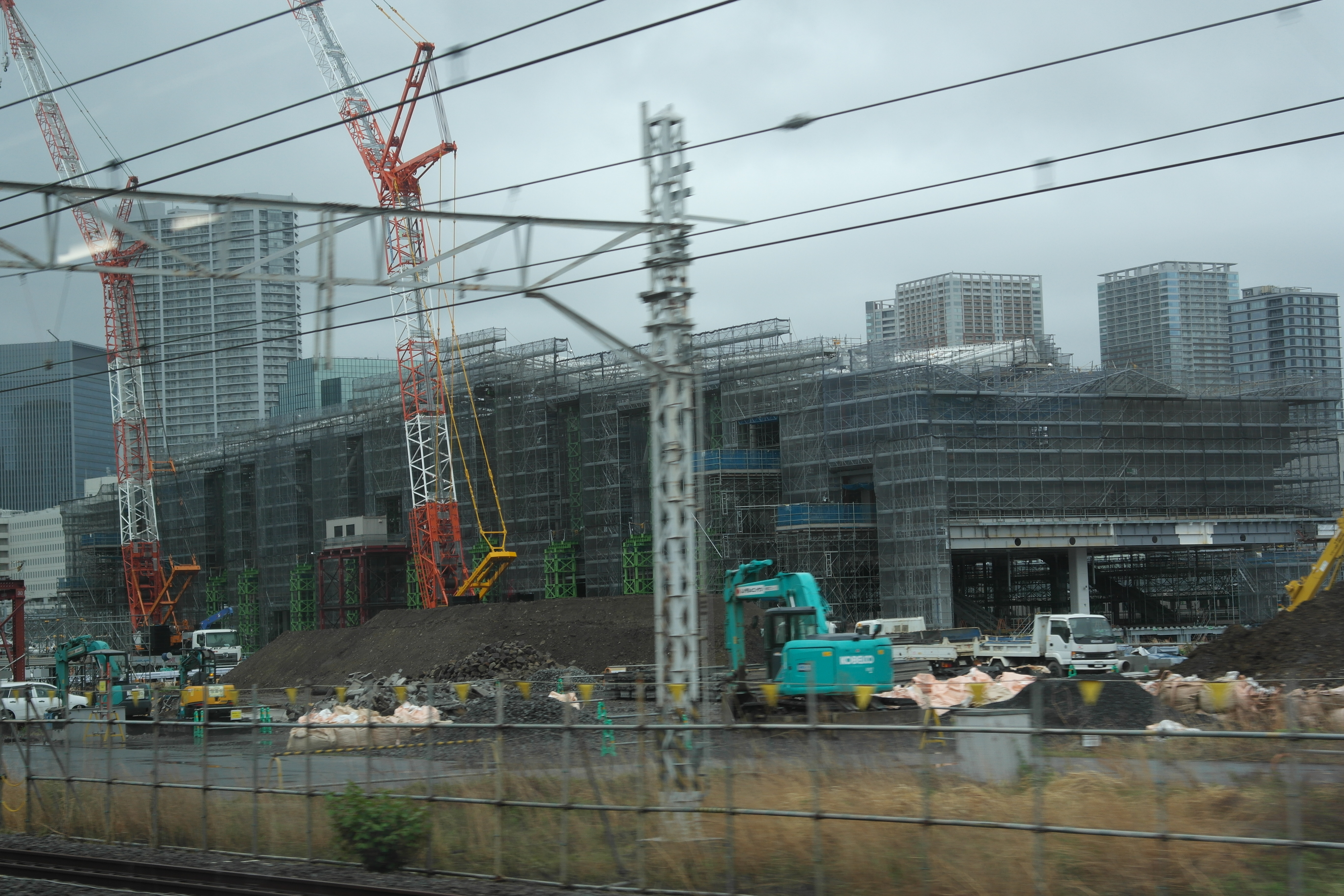
Station building under construction, as seen from within a Keihin-Tōhoku Line train

The station has two island platforms, serving the two lines stopping there. Above platform level, there will be an event space overlooking the platforms, with shopping and dining facilities inside the station.

The station was designed by Kengo Kuma.

=== Platforms ===
Takanawa Gateway Station has 4 tracks and 2 island platforms. Each platform equipped 3 escalators, 1 24-person elevator and 1 18-person elevator to the paid area of the concourse on the second floor.

1	Yamanote Line	for Tokyo, Ueno, and Tabata
2	Yamanote Line	for Shinagawa, Shibuya, Shinjuku
3	Keihin-Tōhoku Line	for Tokyo, Ueno, and Ōmiya
4	Keihin-Tōhoku Line	for Shinagawa, Kamata, Yokohama, Sakuragichō, and Ōfuna

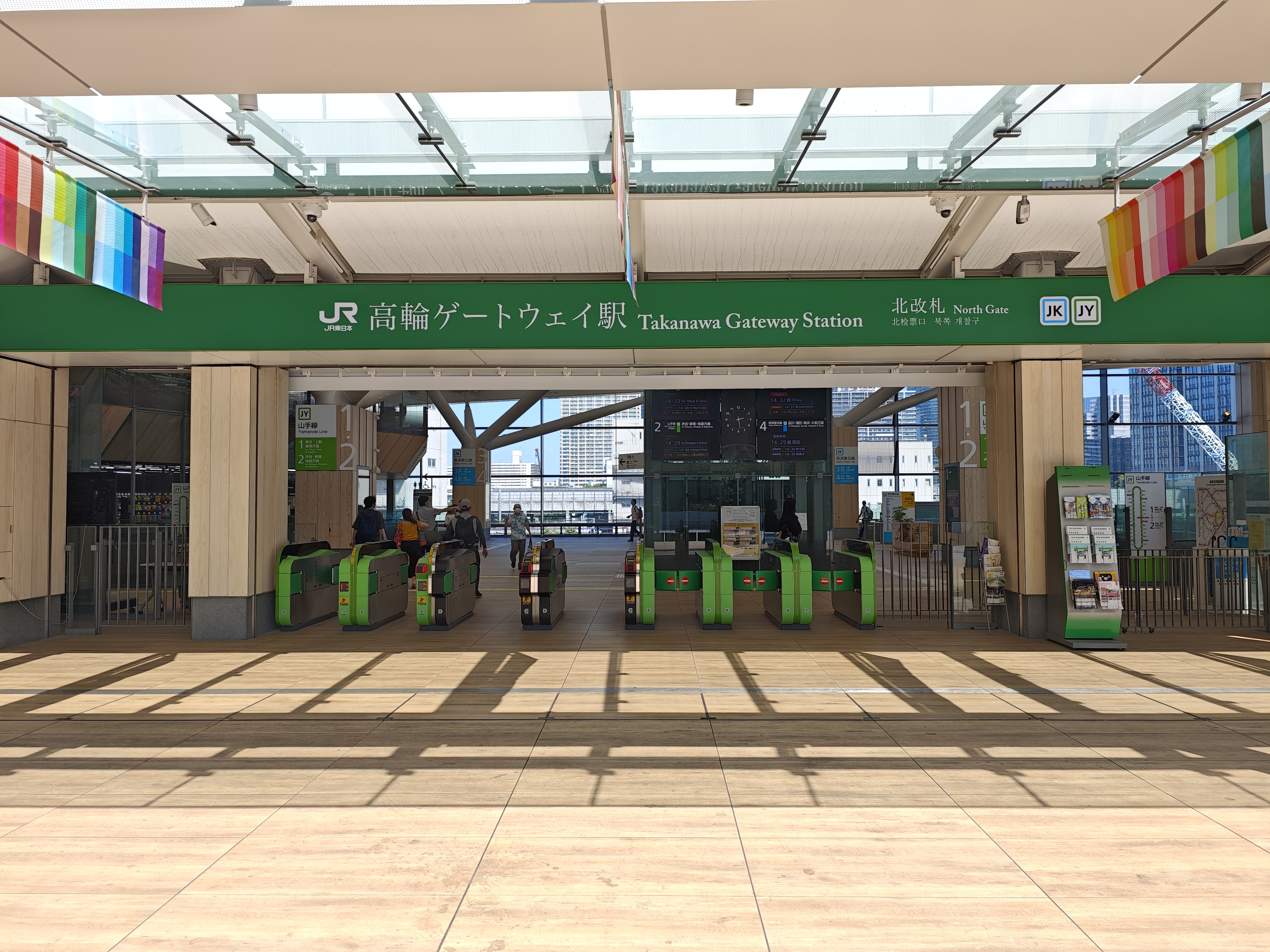
North ticket gates

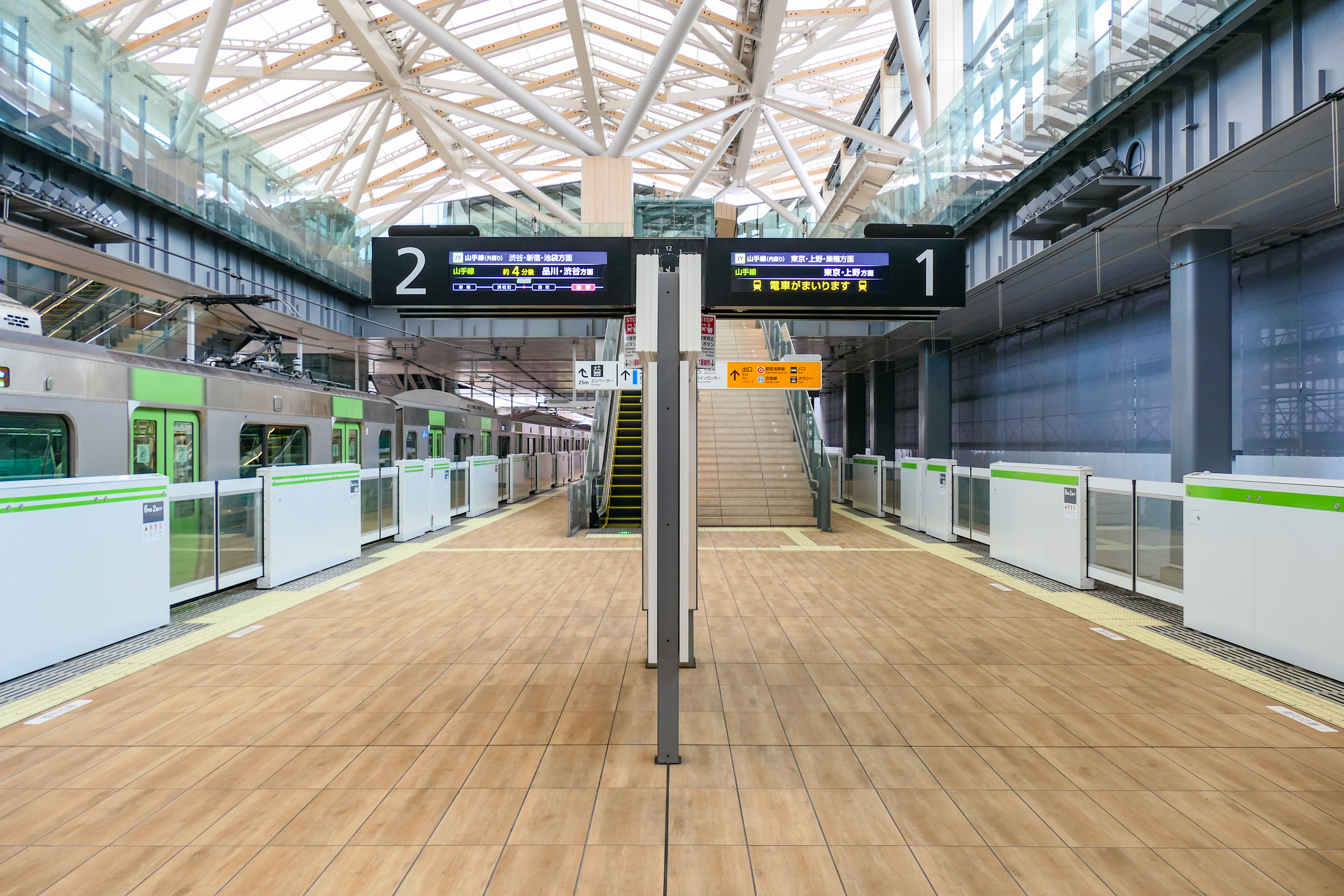
Platforms 1 and 2

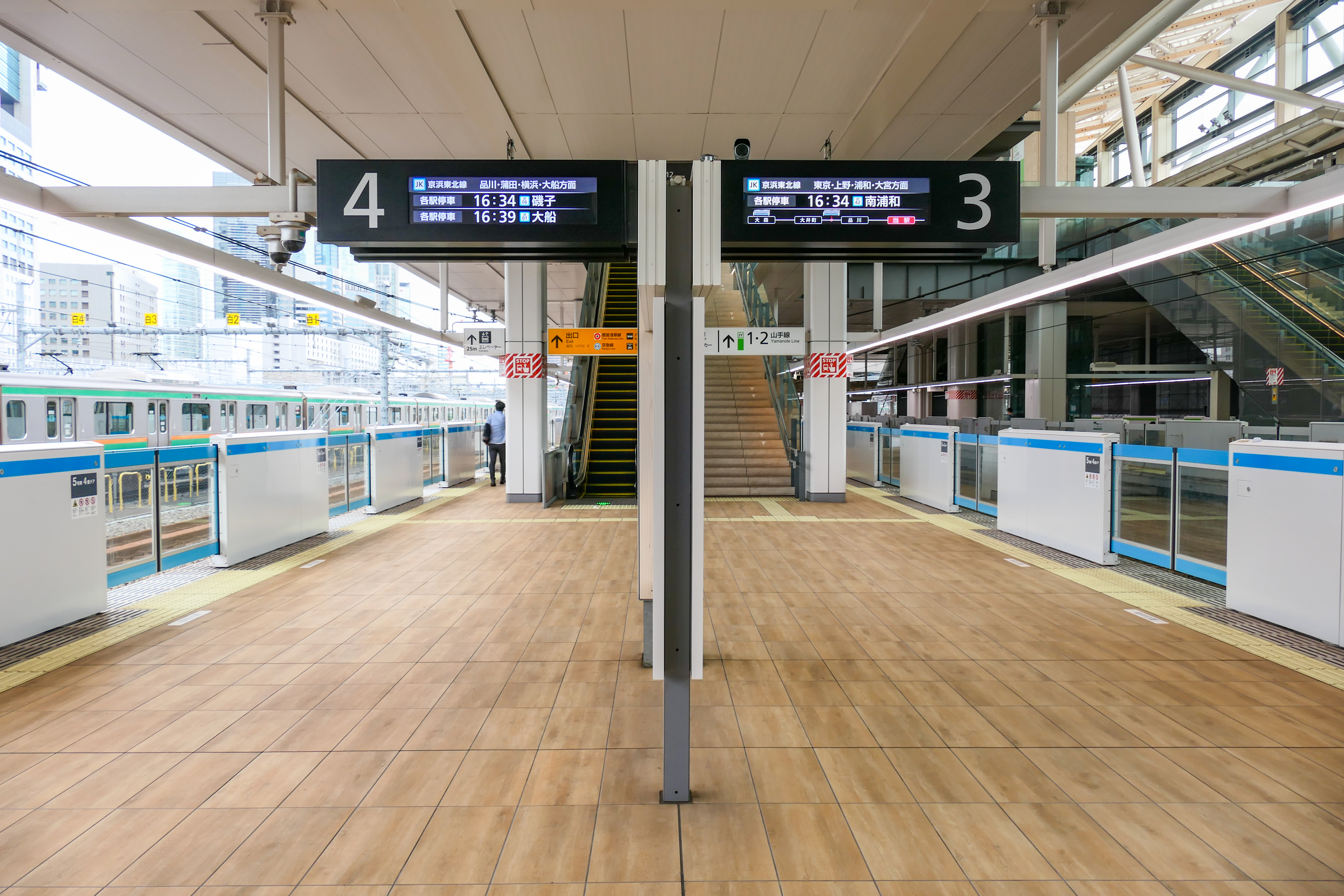
Platforms 3 and 4

== Surrounding area ==
13 hectares (32 acres) of area in the Tamachi Depot will be repurposed and redeveloped, for an estimated cost of 500 billion Japanese yen. The Yamanote and Keihin-Tōhoku Line tracks were moved east by 120 meters (393 ft 8 in), such that office buildings, hotels, commercial buildings and high-rise skyscrapers could be built around the area, originally scheduled to open in 2024. JR East and the Urban Renaissance Agency are cooperating in this project. The project was later known as Takanawa Gateway City. The master plan for Takanawa Gateway City was designed by global architecture firm Pickard Chilton, with the development centered around Takanawa Gateway Station. The first segment of Takanawa Gateway City, The Linkpillar 1, was inaugurated on 27 March 2025. The entire complex is slated for full completion by spring 2026.

== History ==
On 3 June 2014, JR East announced that a new station would be built between Tamachi and Shinagawa stations, at 1.3 km (0.81 mi) south from Tamachi Station, 0.9 km (0.56 mi) north from Shinagawa Station, and about 300 meters (984 ft 3 in) southeast of Sengakuji Station. The station was built above the existing Tamachi Depot, with 13 hectares (32 acres) of the Depot's space being repurposed and redeveloped. The station was planned to open in 2020, to meet with the Tokyo Olympics and Paralympics and is the newest station to be built since Nishi-Nippori Station (opened in 1971) for the Yamanote Line, and Saitama-Shintoshin Station (opened in 2000) for the Keihin-Tōhoku Line.

On 6 September 2016, JR East announced the outline of this station and it was positioned as the core facility of Shinagawa Development Project "Global Gateway Shinagawa".

On 10 February 2017, construction on the station began.

From 5 to 30 June 2018, JR East publicly invited citizens to submit ideas of names for the new station, via mail or online submission. They announced that the finalized name of the station would be announced during winter 2018, while on 4 December 2018, the name was announced to be "Takanawa Gateway".

The Yamanote and Keihin-Tōhoku Lines between Shinagawa and Tamachi were rerouted via the new station on 16 November 2019 during construction that suspended train service on the lines from the early morning until around 4:00 pm.

The station opened on 14 March 2020, ten days before the summer Olympics were postponed to 2021 as a result of the COVID-19 pandemic. However, it was believed that the shopping and dining facilities inside will not be fully completed until 2024.

The second (South) Exit opened on 27 March 2025, with the opening to the public of the Takanawa Gateway City complex.

=== Naming ===
During the public naming campaign conducted by JR East in June 2018, the following names were suggested for the station (in alphabetical order):

- Higashi-Sengakuji Station (東泉岳寺駅) – the station is east of Sengakuji Station
- JR Sengakuji Station (JR泉岳寺駅) – to distinguish it from the existing station of the same name on Toei Asakusa Line
- Kōnan Station (港南駅) – the station is located in the Kōnan district, southern Minato ward
- Kōnan-Takanawa Station (港南高輪駅)
- Minami-Minato/Nankō Station (南港駅)
- Minami-Kōnan Station (南港南駅)
- Nishi-Kōnan Station (西港南駅)
- Nishi-Shibaura Station (西芝浦駅)
- Olympics 2020 Station (オリンピック2020駅)
- Shibaura Station (芝浦駅) – the Shibaura district is north of Kōnan
- Shin-Kita-Shinagawa Station (新北品川駅) – the new station is north of Shinagawa Station
- Shin-Shinagawa Station (新品川駅)
- Takanawa Station (高輪駅) – the Takanawa district is located west of Kōnan
- Takanawa Ōkido Station (高輪大木戸駅) – Takanawa Ōkido is a historical relic located next to Sengakuji Station

The results of the campaign concluded with the three top choices: Takanawa (8,398 votes), Shibaura (4,265 votes), and Shibahama (3,497 votes). However, Takanawa Gateway Station (高輪ゲートウェイ駅) was selected as the official name of the station despite receiving an exceedingly low number of votes, placing 130th overall in popularity among all submissions with 36 votes. Yuji Fukasawa, president of JR East, has justified the naming with Takanawa's historical status of being a "gateway to Edo", while also serving as the site for the development of an international hub in the future. (In the 1800s, the official southern entrance to Edo, as Tokyo was then called, was the Takanawa Great Wooden Gate directly to the west of the station.) This choice has spurred criticism from several members of the public, citing the decision being made with a lack of consideration to the public's wishes. According to a poll conducted by the Japanese website j-town.net, 95.8% of respondents disapproved of the name "Takanawa Gateway", while a Change.org petition calling for a name change had gathered over 9,500 signatures as of 9 December 2018. At the time the petition ended, it had 47,766 signatures.

== See also ==
- List of railway stations in Japan
- Sengakuji Station, a nearby Toei Asakusa Line station, where accompanying construction works are undergoing to extend the station platforms by 5 meters, to cope with the increasing ridership brought by this station.
- Takanawa Great Wooden Gate
