= Machiya Station =

Railway, metro, and tram station in Tokyo, Japan

Coordinates: 35.7424°N 139.7816°E

Machiya Station Machiya-ekimae Station 町屋駅 町屋駅前停留場

General information
- Location: Arakawa-ku, Tokyo; Japan
- Operator: Keisei Electric Railway; Tokyo Metro; Toei
- Lines: Keisei Main Line; Chiyoda Line; Toden Arakawa Line
Location
- Location within Special wards of Tokyo Location within Tokyo Bay and Bōsō Peninsula Location within Tokyo Location within Japan

Machiya Station (町屋駅, Machiya-eki) is a train station in Arakawa, Tokyo, Japan, operated by Keisei Electric Railway and Tokyo Metro. This article also covers Machiya-ekimae Station (町屋駅前停留場, Machiya-ekimae teiryūjō), operated by Tokyo Metropolitan Bureau of Transportation (Toei).

== Lines ==
- Keisei Electric Railway - Machiya Station
  - Keisei Main Line
- Tokyo Metro - Machiya Station
  - Chiyoda Line
- Tokyo Metropolitan Bureau of Transportation (Toei) - Machiya-ekimae Station
  - Tokyo Sakura Tram

== Keisei ==
KS04 Machiya Station 町屋駅
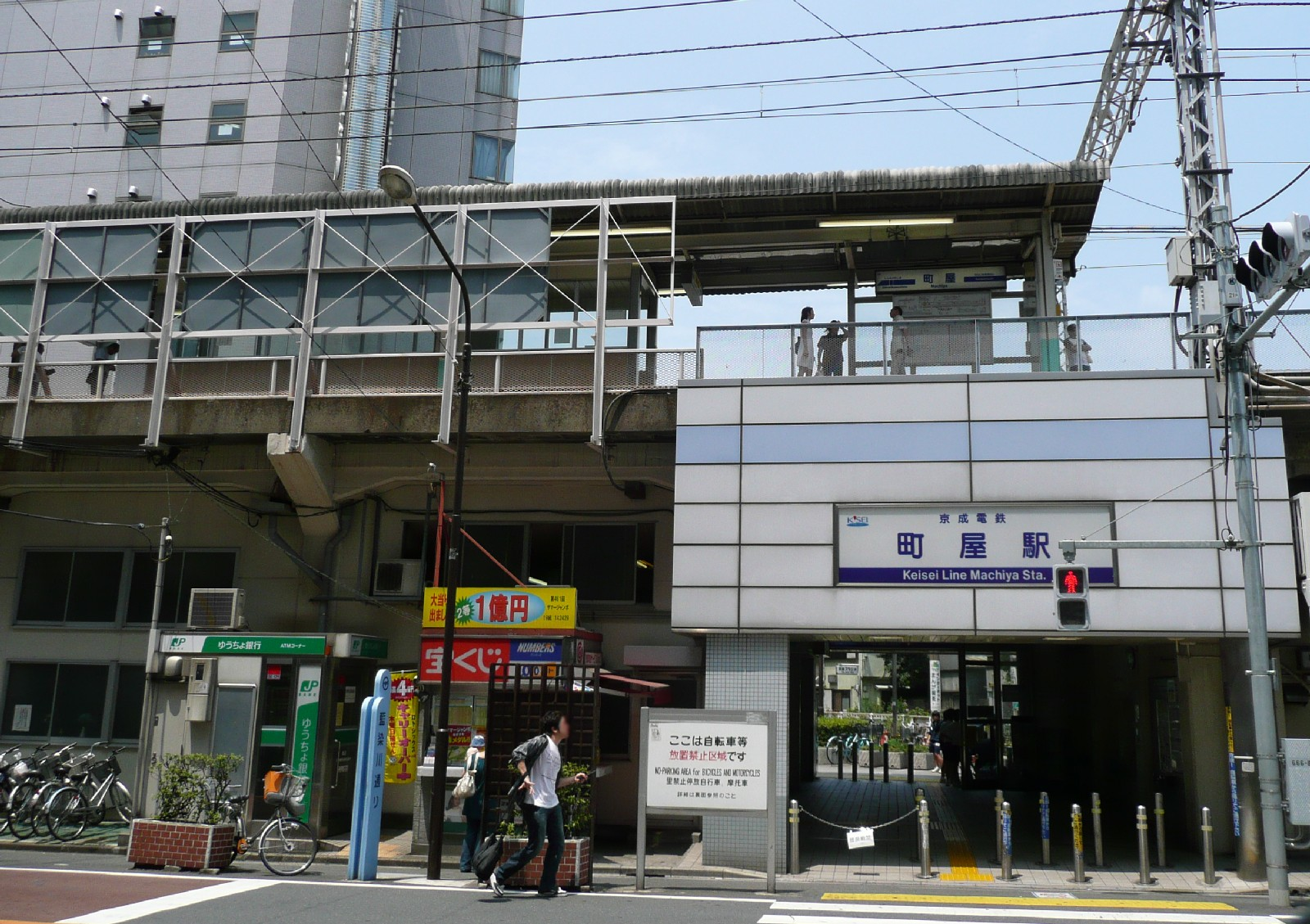
- Keisei station in July 2008

General information
- Location: 7-40-1 Arakawa, Arakawa-ku, Tokyo; Japan
- Operator: Keisei Electric Railway
- Line: Keisei Main Line
- Distance: 4.3 km from Keisei Ueno
- Platforms: 1 island platform
- Tracks: 2

Other information
- Station code: KS04

History
- Opened: 19 December 1931

Passengers
- FY2017: 20,655 daily

Services
Preceding station	Keisei	Following station
Shim-Mikawashima KS03 towards Keisei Ueno	Main Line Local	Senjuōhashi KS05 towards Narita Airport Terminal 1
Location

The Keisei Main Line station consists of a single island platform serving two tracks. There is a waiting room in the center of the platform. Until October 2002, express trains stopped at the station.

=== Platforms ===
1	Keisei Main Line	for Nippori and Keisei Ueno
2	Keisei Main Line	for Aoto, Keisei Funabashi, and Narita Airport

== Tokyo Metro ==
Machiya Station 町屋駅

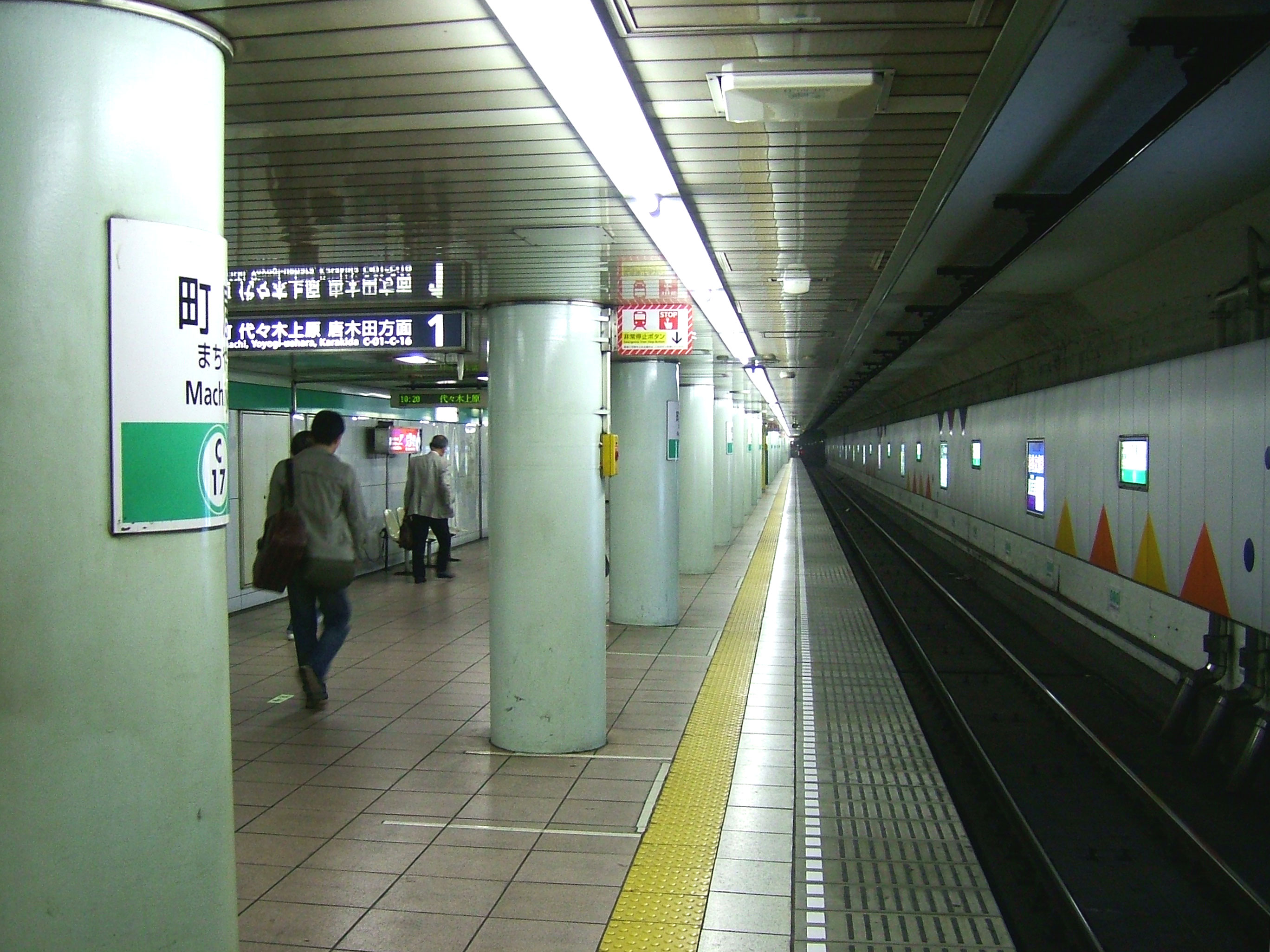
- Station platforms

General information
- Location: 1-1-5 Machiya, Arakawa-ku, Tokyo; Japan
- Operator: Tokyo Metro
- Line: Chiyoda Line
- Distance: 5.2 km (3.2 mi) from Ayase
- Platforms: 2 split side platforms
- Tracks: 2

Construction
- Structure type: Underground

Other information
- Station code: C-17
- Website: www.tokyometro.jp/lang_en/station/machiya/index.html

History
- Opened: 20 December 1969; 56 years ago

Passengers
- FY2015: 59,061 daily

Services
Preceding station	Tokyo Metro	Following station
Nishi-nippori towards Yoyogi-Uehara	Chiyoda Line	Kita-senju towards Kita-Ayase
Location

The Chiyoda Line station consists of two underground split platforms, with the Yoyogi-Uehara platform on the upper level and the Ayase platform on the lower level.

=== Platforms ===
1	Chiyoda Line	for Nishi-nippori, Otemachi and Yoyogi-uehara; Odakyu Odawara Line for Hon-Atsugi and Isehara
2	Chiyoda Line	for Kita-senju, Ayase and Kita-ayase; Jōban Line (Local) for Matsudo and Toride

== Toei ==
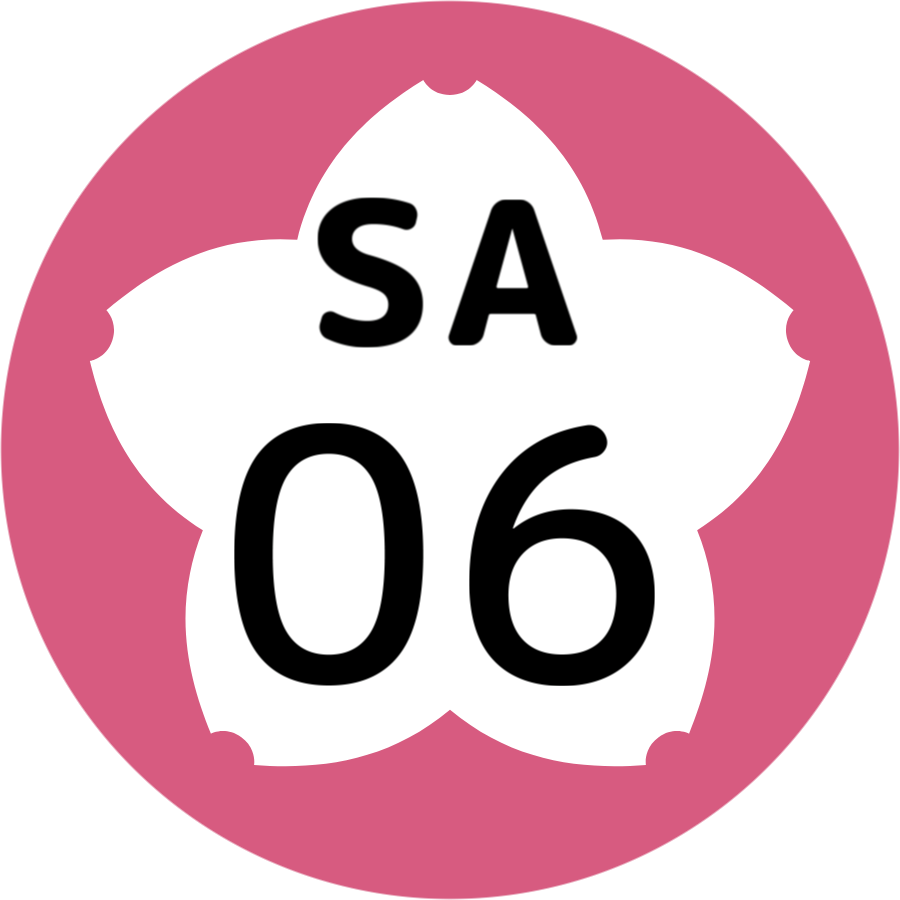
Machiya-ekimae Station 町屋駅前停留場

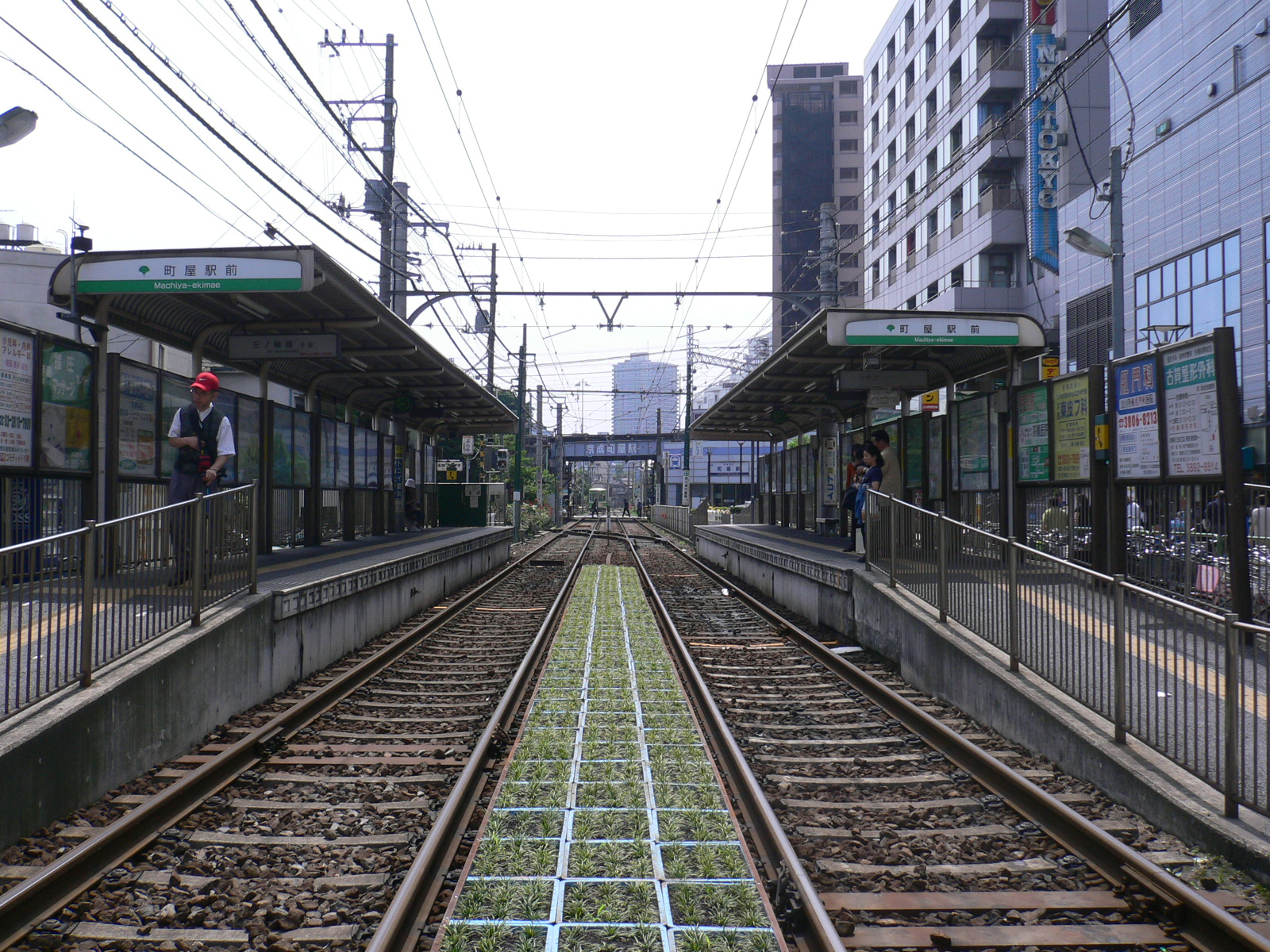
- Tokyo Sakura Tram tracks and platforms

General information
- Location: 7 Arakawa, Arakawa-ku, Tokyo; Japan
- Operator: Toei
- Line: Toden Arakawa Line
- Distance: 1.8 km (1.1 mi) from Minowabashi
- Platforms: 2 side platforms
- Tracks: 2

Construction
- Structure type: At grade

Other information
- Station code: SA06
- Website: www.kotsu.metro.tokyo.jp/eng/services/streetcar/stations/machiya-ekimae.html

History
- Opened: 1 April 1913; 113 years ago
- Former names: Machiya-itchome

Services
Preceding station	Toei	Following station
Machiya-nichōme towards Waseda	Toden Arakawa Line	Arakawa-nanachōme towards Minowabashi
Location

The Tokyo Sakura Tram station consists of two side platforms serving two tracks. The station was previously named as Machiya-itchome station.

== History ==
- 1 April 1913 - Ōji Electric Tramway (now Toden Arakawa line) station opens
- 19 December 1931 - Keisei Electric Tramway (now Keisei Electric Railway) station opens
- 20 December 1969 - Chiyoda subway line station opens
- 1 April 2004 - Ownership of station facilities on the Chiyoda Line were transferred to Tokyo Metro after the privatization of the Teito Rapid Transit Authority (TRTA).
- 17 June 2010 - Station numbering was introduced to all Keisei Line stations; Machiya was assigned station number KS03.

In the 2015 data available from Japan’s Ministry of Land, Infrastructure, Transport and Tourism, Machiya → Nishi Nippori of the Chiyoda line was one of the train segments among Tokyo's most crowded train lines during rush hour.

== Surrounding area ==
- Arakawa Sizen Park
- Mikawashima Sewage Treatment Center
- Machiya Bunka Center

== Connecting bus services ==
Machiya-ekimae (Machiya Station) (Toei Bus)

No.1

- Kusa 41: for Adachi-umedachō

No.2

- Kusa 41: for Asakusa-kotobukichō

Machiya Station (Keisei Bus)

- Minami-sen 01, 02: for Minami-Senju Station West Entrance
- Machiya 04, 05: for Kodomo-katei-shien Center and Shim-Mikawashima Station
- Machiya 05: for Ogubashi (Kumanomae Station)

== See also ==
- List of railway stations in Japan
