= Arakawa-nichōme Station =

Tram station in Arakawa, Tokyo

Coordinates: 35.7386°N 139.7850°E

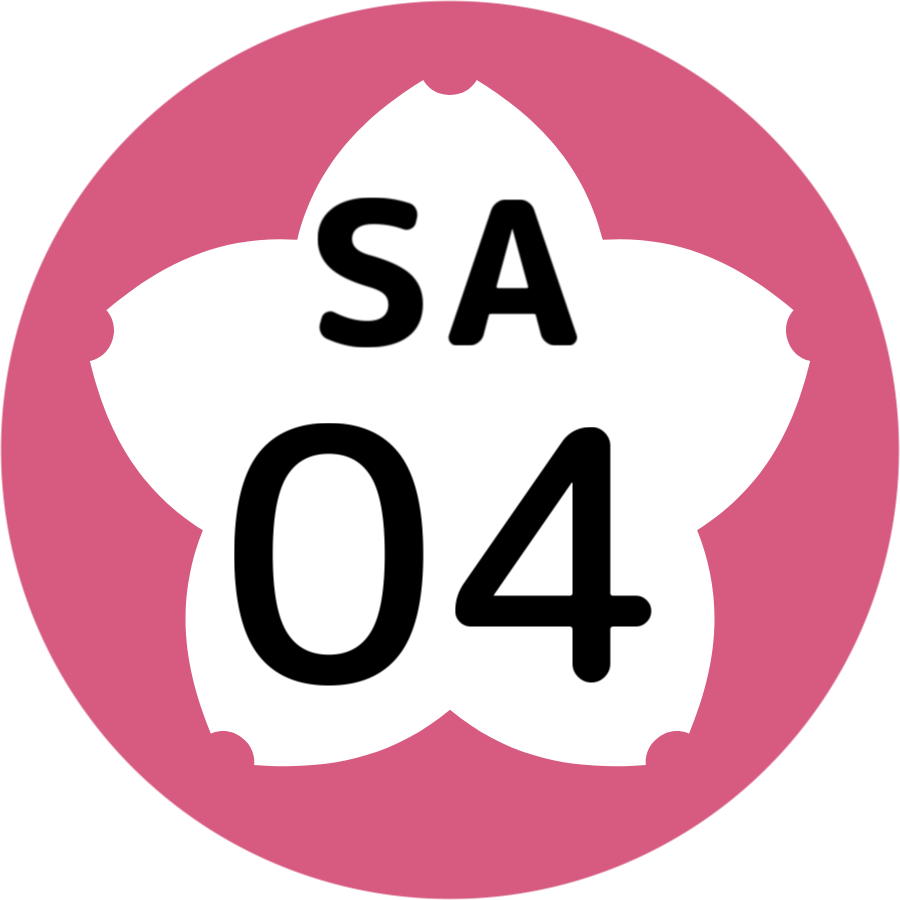
Arakawa-nichōme Station 荒川二丁目停留場

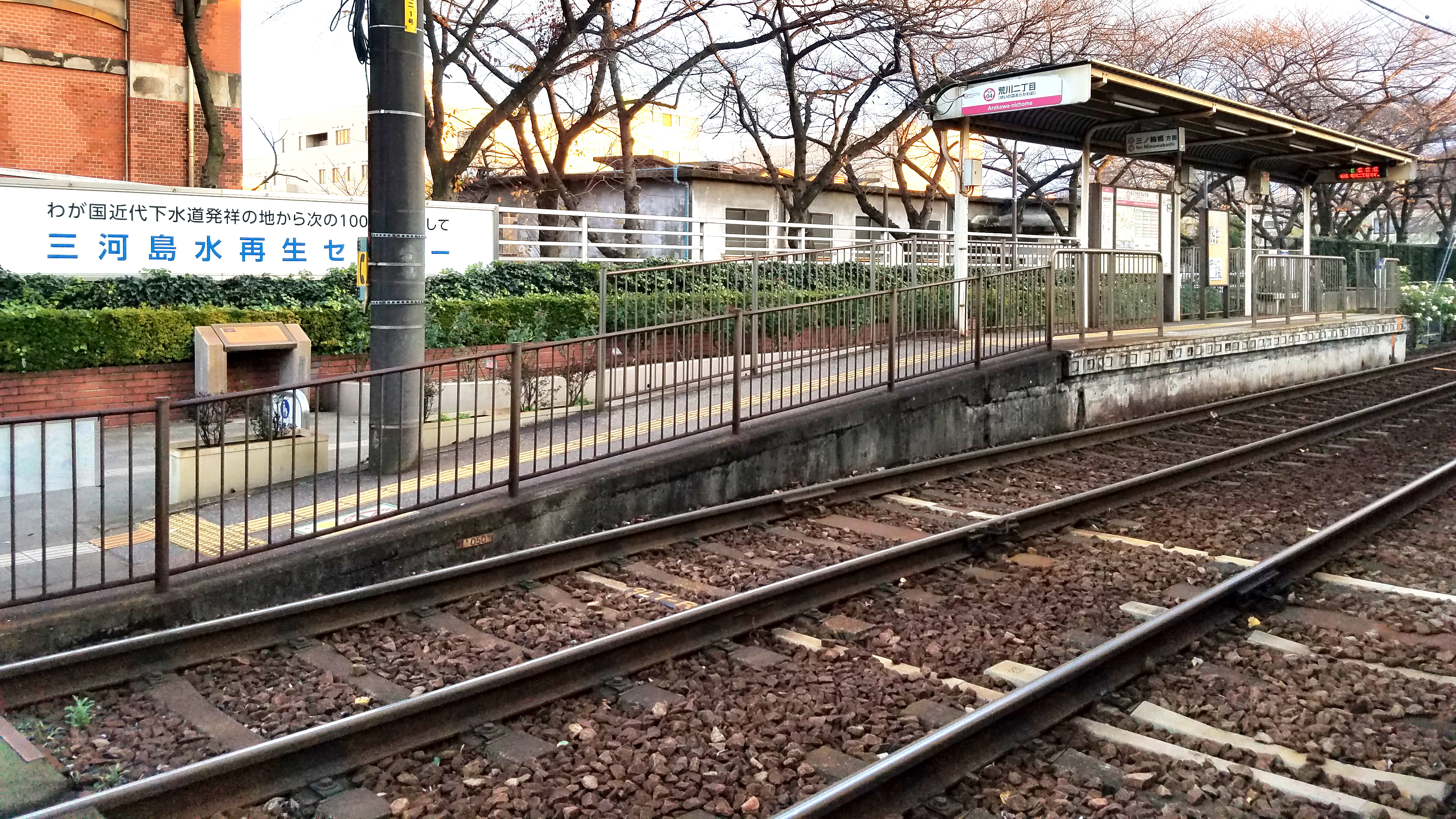
- The Minowabashi-bound platform in December 2018

General information
- Location: Arakawa 2-chome, Arakawa, Tokyo; Japan
- Operator: Toei
- Line: Toden Arakawa Line
- Platforms: 2 side platforms
- Tracks: 2

Construction
- Structure type: At grade

Other information
- Station code: SA04

History
- Opened: 1 April 1913; 113 years ago

Services
Preceding station	Toei	Following station
Arakawa-nanachōme towards Waseda	Toden Arakawa Line	Arakawa-kuyakushomae towards Minowabashi
Location
- Location within Special wards of Tokyo Location within Tokyo Bay and Bōsō Peninsula Location within Tokyo Location within Japan

Arakawa-nichome Station (荒川二丁目停留場, Arakawa-nichōme-teiryūjō) is a tram station operated by Toei's Tokyo Sakura Tram located in Arakawa, Tokyo Japan. It is 1.0 kilometre from the terminus of the Tokyo Sakura Tram at Minowabashi Station.

== Layout ==
Arakawa-nichome Station has two opposed side platforms.

== Surrounding area ==
- Arakawa Sizen Park . Yuinomori Arakawa (library and community facility).

== History ==
- April 1, 1913: Station opened
