= Higashi-ogu-sanchōme Station =

Tram station in Tokyo, Japan

Coordinates: 35.7454°N 139.7740°E

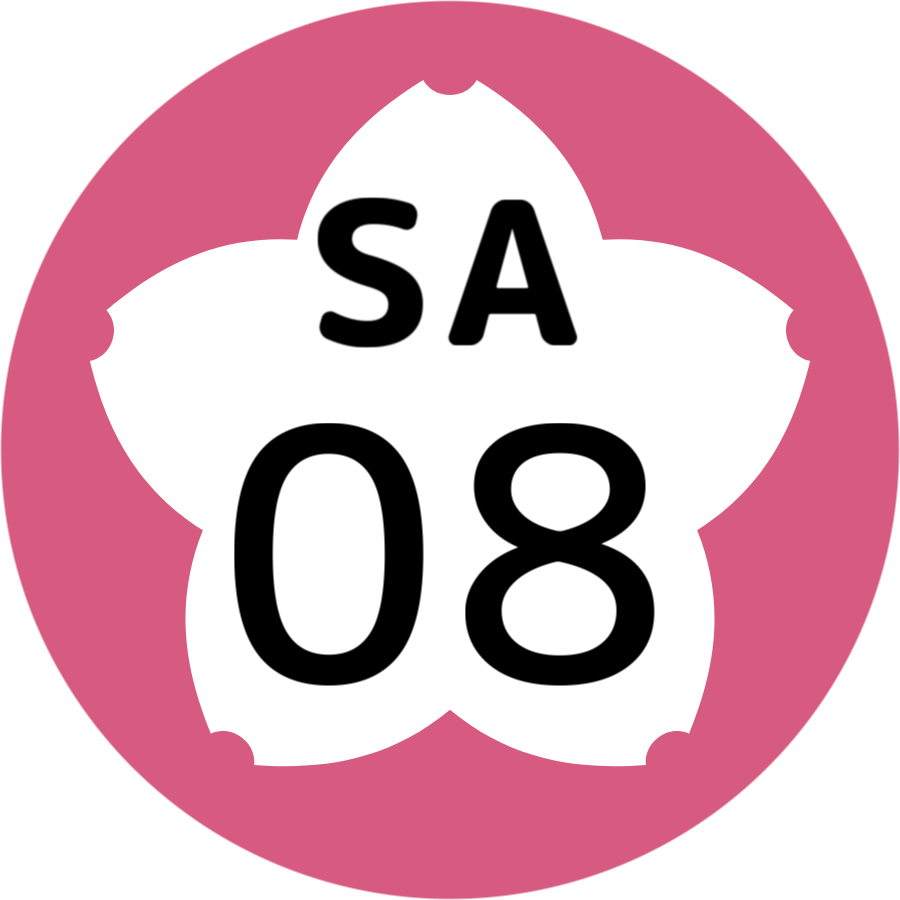
Higashi-ogu-sanchōme Station 東尾久三丁目停留場

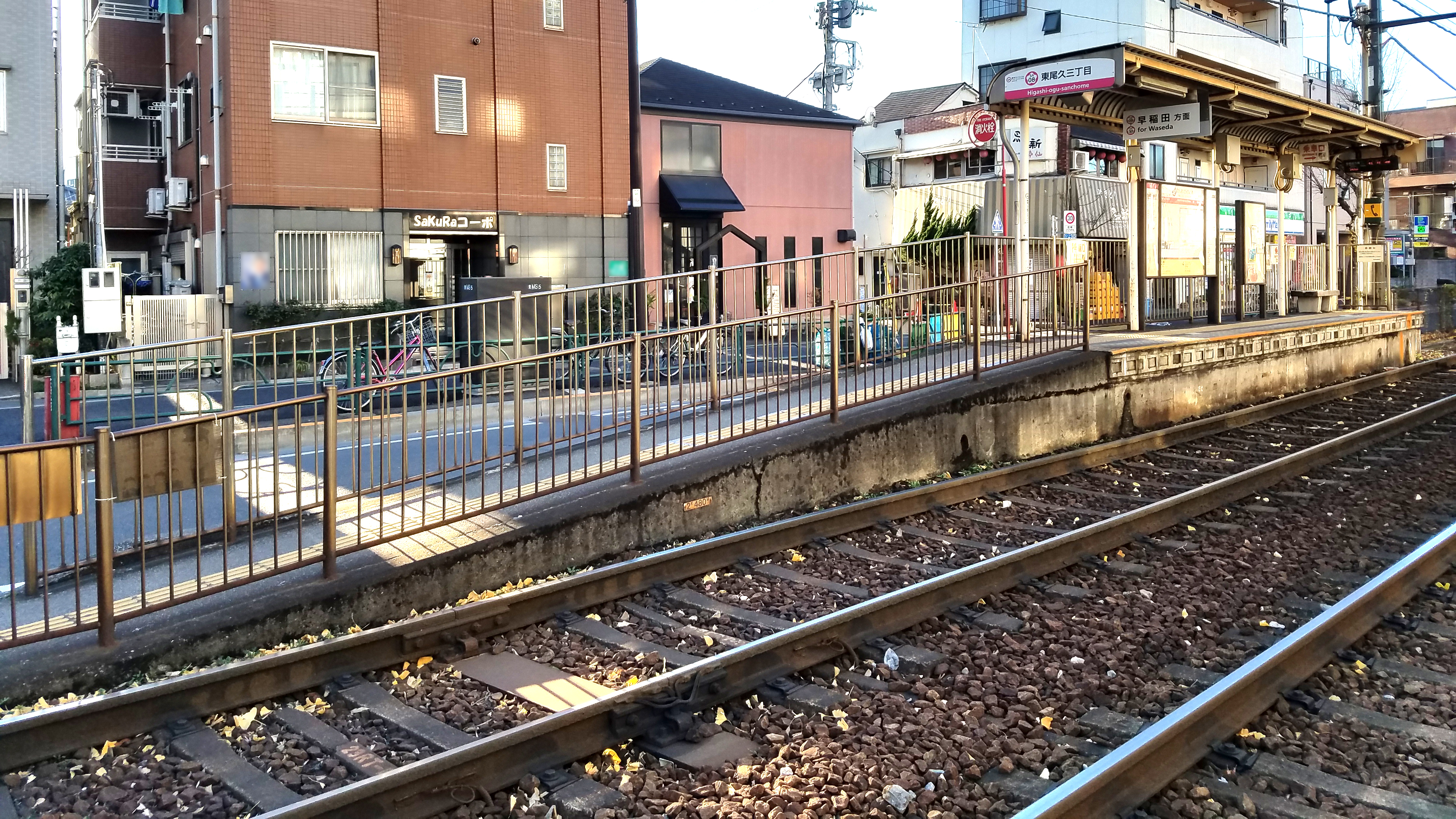
- The Waseda-bound platform in January 2021

General information
- Location: 3-chome Higashiogu, Arakawa, Tokyo; Japan
- Operator: Toei
- Line: Toden Arakawa Line
- Platforms: 2 side platforms
- Tracks: 2

Construction
- Structure type: At grade

Other information
- Station code: SA08

History
- Opened: 1 April 1913; 113 years ago

Services
Preceding station	Toei	Following station
Kumanomae towards Waseda	Toden Arakawa Line	Machiya-nichōme towards Minowabashi
Location
- Location within Special wards of Tokyo Location within Tokyo Bay and Bōsō Peninsula Location within Tokyo Location within Japan

Higashi-ogu-sanchome Station (東尾久三丁目停留場, Higashi-ogu-sanchōme-teiryūjō) is a tram station operated by Tokyo Metropolitan Bureau of Transportation's Tokyo Sakura Tram located in Arakawa, Tokyo, Japan. It is 2.5 kilometres from the terminus of the Tokyo Sakura Tram at Minowabashi Station.

== Layout ==
Higashi-ogu-sanchome Station has two opposed side platforms.

== History ==
- April 1, 1913: Station opened
