= Arakawa-nanachōme Station =

Tram station in Tokyo, Japan

Coordinates: 35.7419°N 139.7840°E

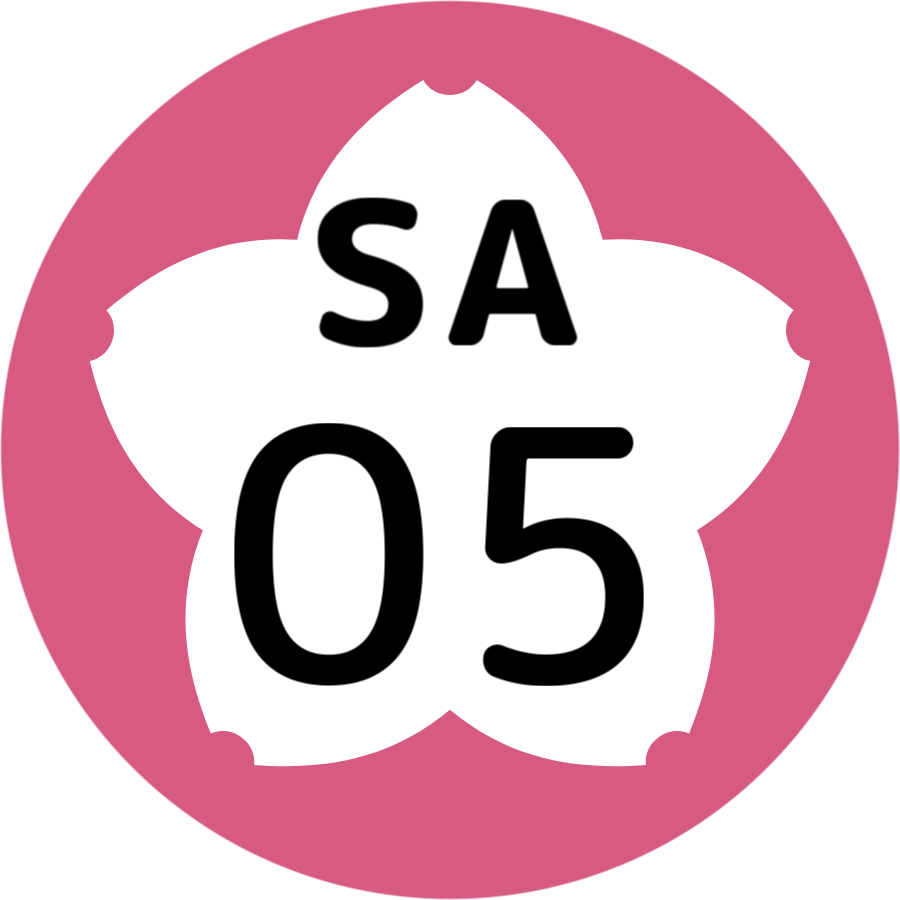
Arakawa-nanachome Station 荒川七丁目停留場

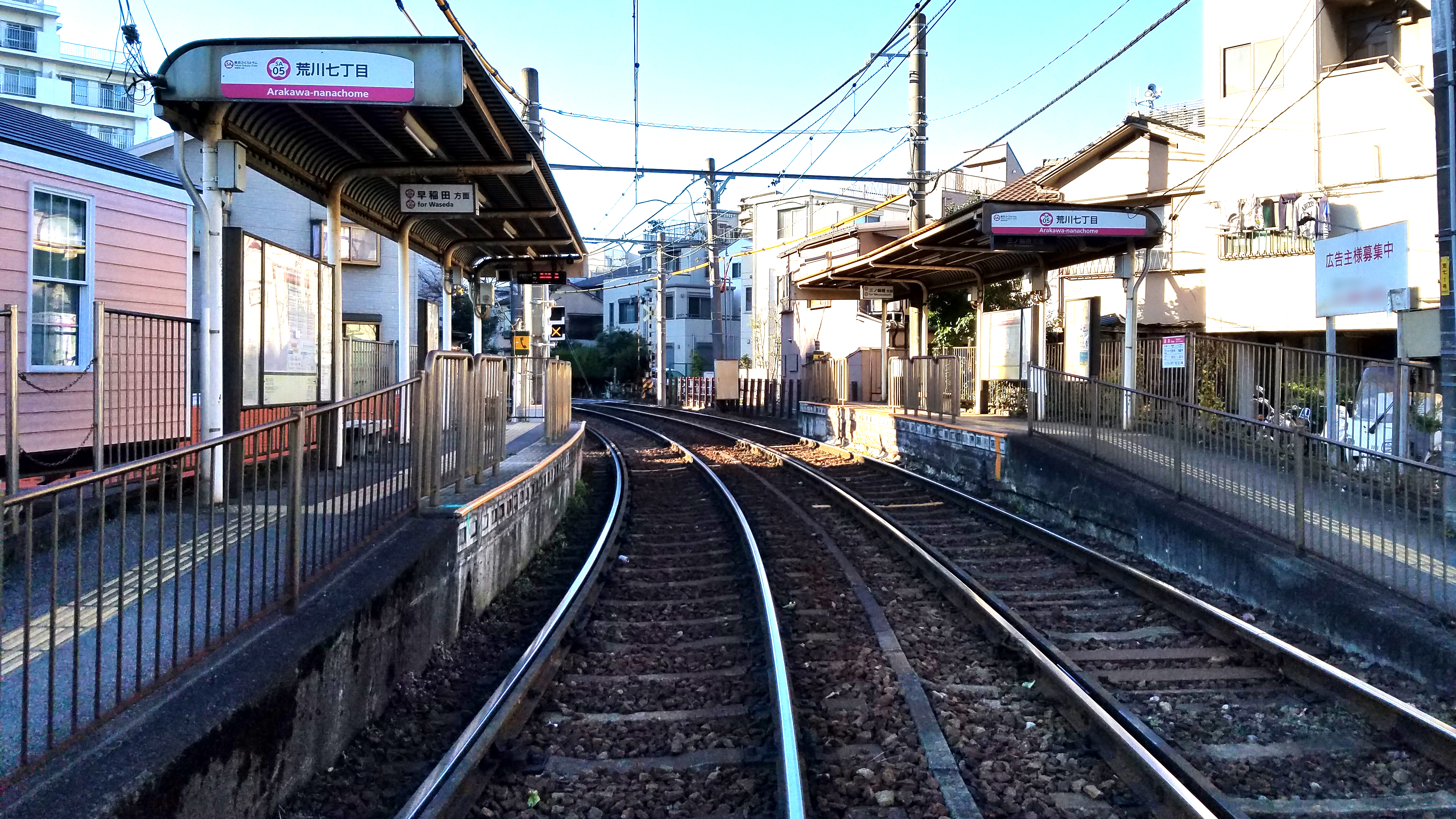
- The platforms in January 2021

General information
- Location: Arakawa 7-chome, Arakawa, Tokyo; Japan
- Operator: Toei
- Line: Toden Arakawa Line
- Platforms: 2 side platforms
- Tracks: 2

Construction
- Structure type: At grade

Other information
- Station code: SA05

History
- Opened: 1 April 1913; 113 years ago

Services
Preceding station	Toei	Following station
Machiya-ekimae towards Waseda	Toden Arakawa Line	Arakawa-nichōme towards Minowabashi
Location
- Location within Special wards of Tokyo Location within Tokyo Bay and Bōsō Peninsula Location within Tokyo Location within Japan

Arakawa-nanachome Station (荒川七丁目停留場, Arakawa-nanachōme-teiryūjō) is a tram station operated by Tokyo Metropolitan Bureau of Transportation's Tokyo Sakura Tram located in Arakawa, Tokyo Japan. It is 1.4 kilometres from the terminus of the Tokyo Sakura Tram at Minowabashi Station.

== Layout ==
Arakawa-nanachome Station has two opposed side platforms.

== Surrounding area ==
- Arakawa Sizen Park . Machiya Bunka Centre

== History ==
- April 1, 1913: Station opened
