= Arakawa-kuyakushomae Station =

Tram station in Tokyo, Japan

Coordinates: 35.7350°N 139.7860°E

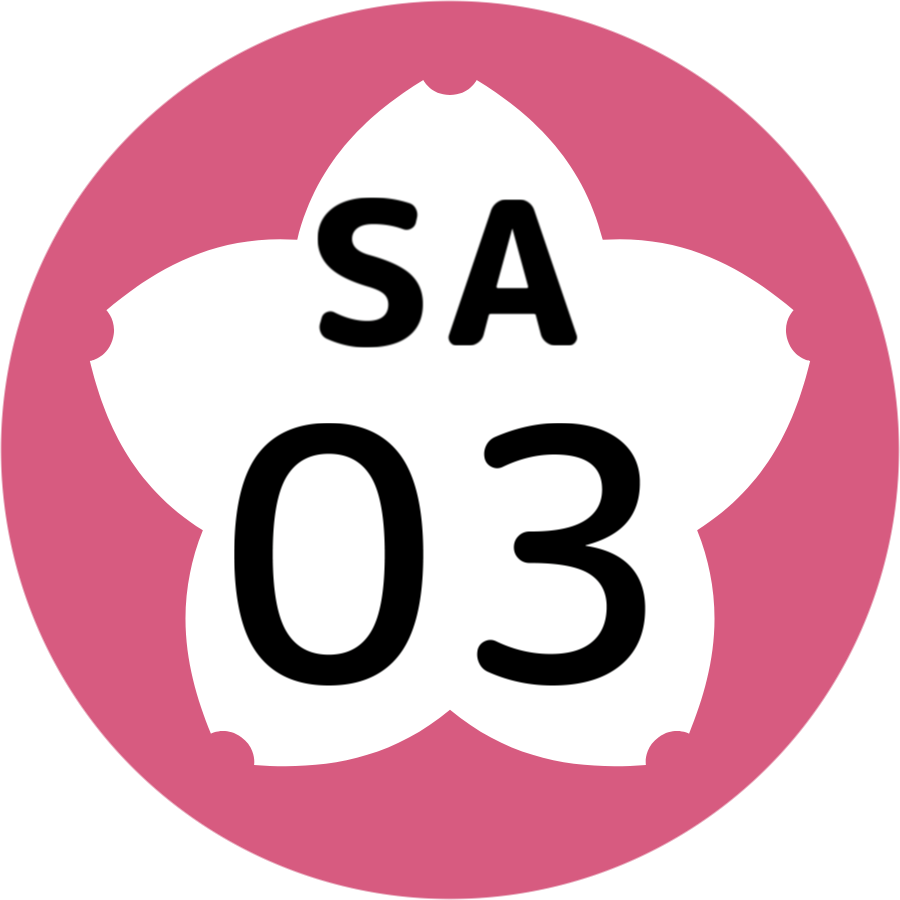
Arakawa-kuyakushomae Station 荒川区役所前停留場

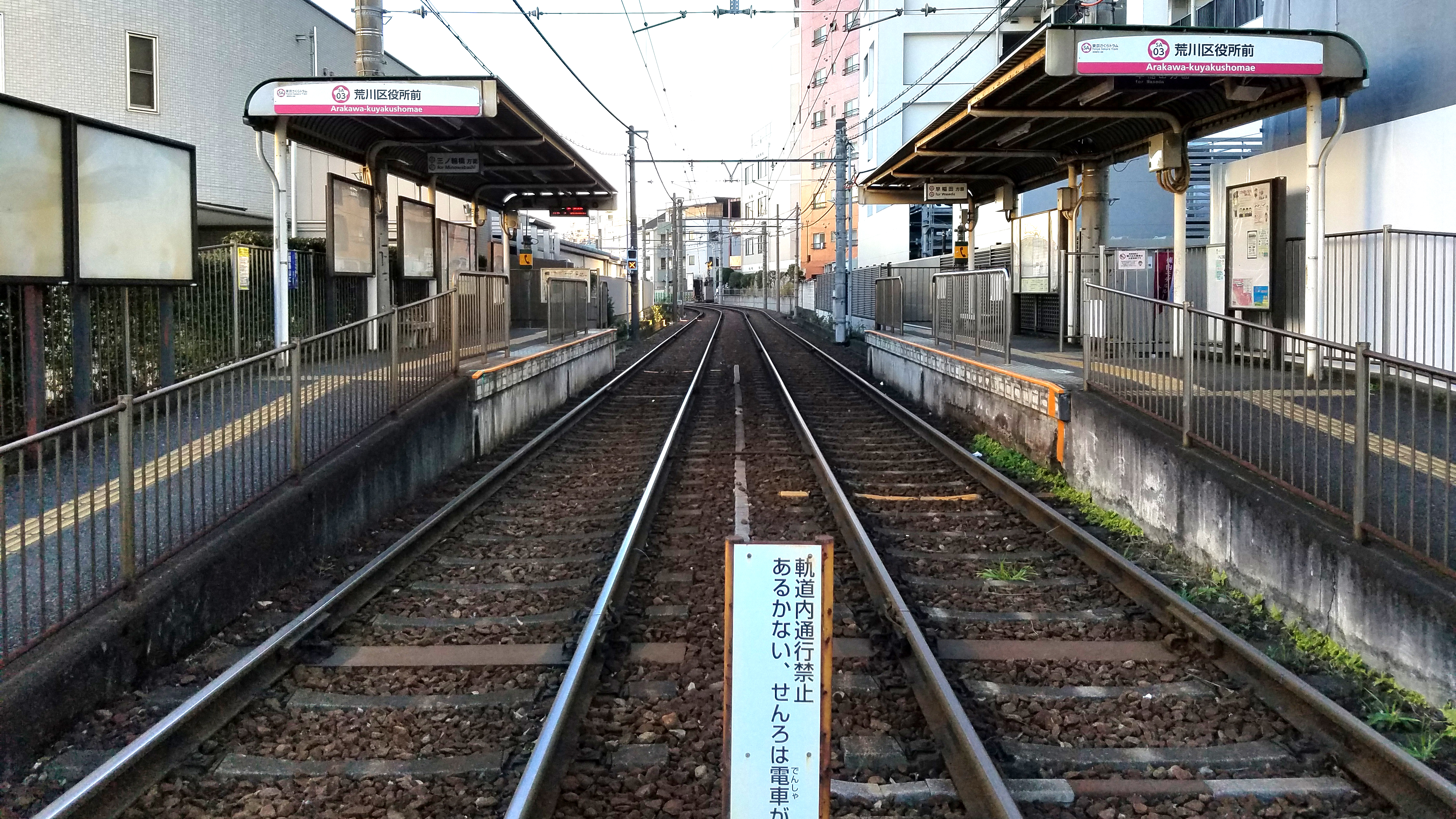
- The platforms in January 2021

General information
- Location: 1-chome Arakawa, Tokyo （東京都荒川区） Japan
- Operator: Toei
- Line: Toden Arakawa Line
- Platforms: 2 side platforms
- Tracks: 2

Construction
- Structure type: At grade

Other information
- Station code: SA03

History
- Opened: 1 April 1913; 113 years ago

Services
Preceding station	Toei	Following station
Arakawa-nichōme towards Waseda	Toden Arakawa Line	Arakawa-itchumae towards Minowabashi
Location
- Location within Special wards of Tokyo Location within Tokyo Bay and Bōsō Peninsula Location within Tokyo Location within Japan

Arakawa-kuyakushomae Station (荒川区役所前停留場, Arakawa-kuyakushomae-teiryūjō) is a tram station operated by Toei's Tokyo Sakura Tram located in Arakawa, Tokyo Japan. It is 0.6 kilometres from the terminus of the Tokyo Sakura Tram at Minowabashi Station.

== Layout ==
Arakawa-kuyakushomae Station has two opposed side platforms.

== Surrounding area ==
- Arakawa City Hall
- Arakawa Post Office
- Arakawa Fire Station

== History ==
- April 1, 1913: Station opened
