= Machiya-nichōme Station =

Tram station in Tokyo, Japan

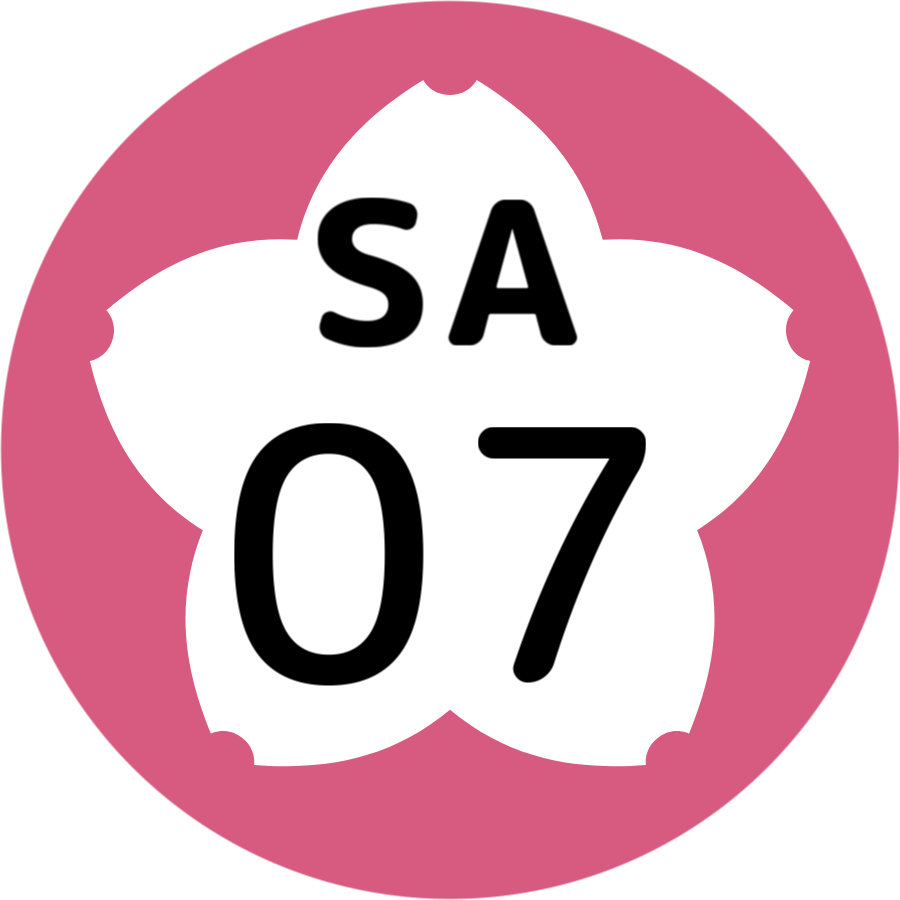
Machiya-nichōme Station 町屋二丁目停留場

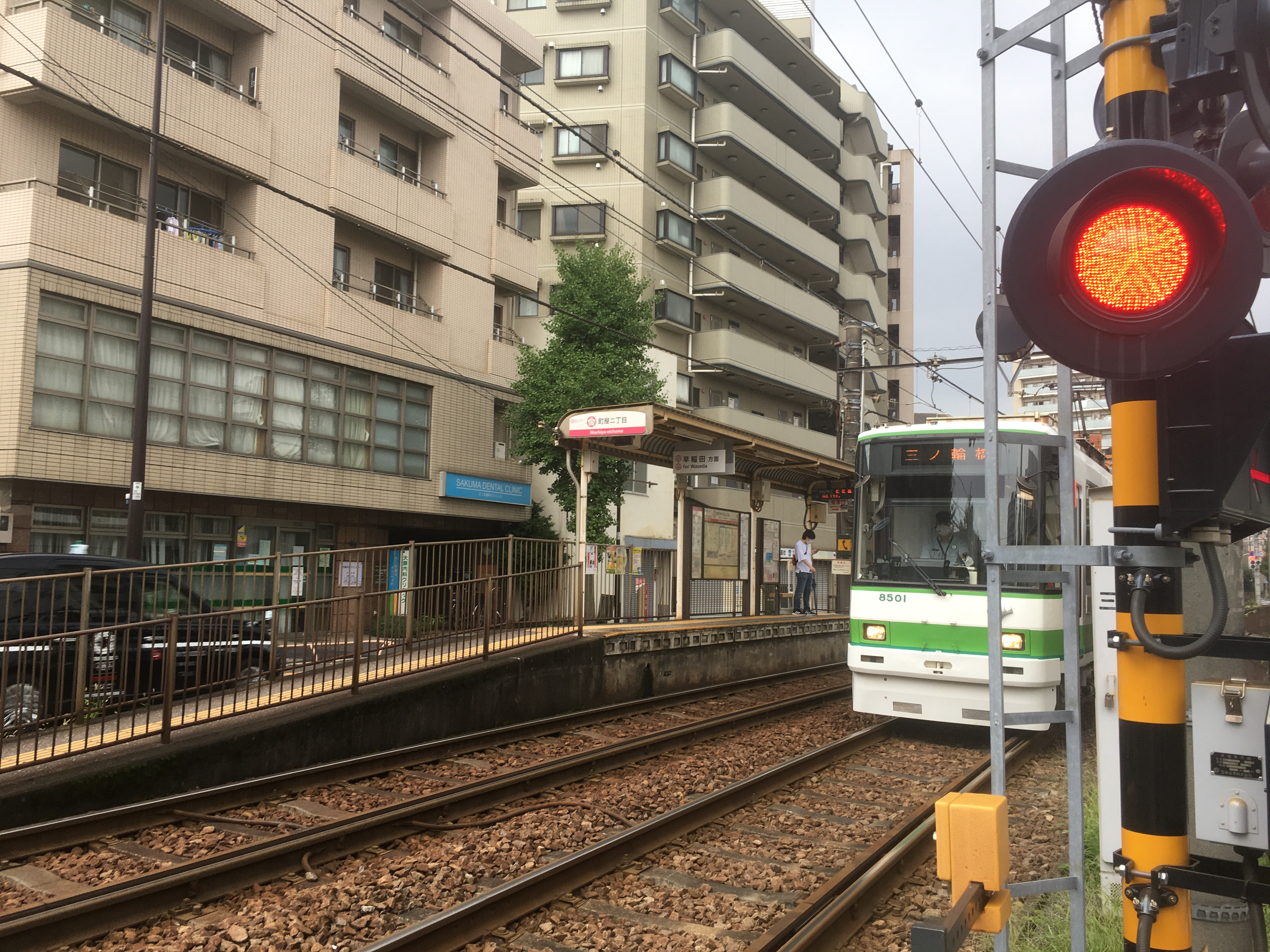
- The Waseda-bound platform in September 2021

General information
- Location: Arakawa, Tokyo; Japan
- Coordinates: 35.7437°N 139.7770°E
- Operator: Toei
- Line: Toden Arakawa Line
- Platforms: 2 side platforms
- Tracks: 2

Construction
- Structure type: At grade

Other information
- Station code: SA07

History
- Opened: 1 April 1913; 113 years ago

Services
Preceding station	Toei	Following station
Higashi-ogu-sanchōme towards Waseda	Toden Arakawa Line	Machiya-ekimae towards Minowabashi
Location
- Location within Special wards of Tokyo Location within Tokyo Bay and Bōsō Peninsula Location within Tokyo Location within Japan

Machiya-nichome Station (町屋二丁目停留場, Machiya-nichōme-teiryūjō) is a tram station operated by Tokyo Metropolitan Bureau of Transportation's Tokyo Sakura Tram located in Arakawa, Tokyo, Japan. It is 2.2 kilometres from the terminus of the Tokyo Sakura Tram at Minowabashi Station.

== Layout ==
Machiya-nichome Station has two opposed side platforms.

== History ==
- April 1, 1913: Station opened
