= Mikawashima train crash =

1962 railway incident in Tokyo, Japan

Coordinates: 35°43′57″N 139°46′59″E

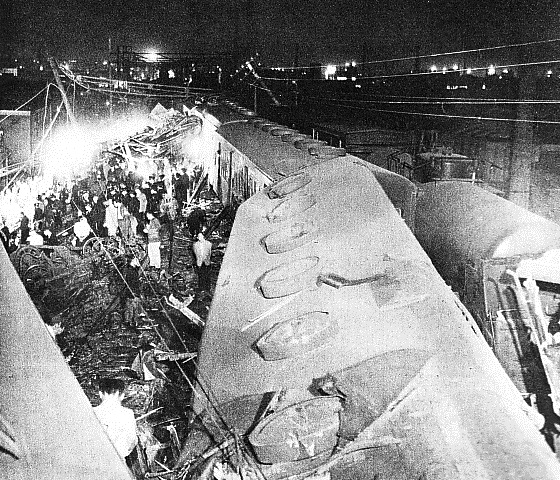

Details
- Date: May 3, 1962; 21:42
- Location: Mikawashima Station
- Country: Japan
- Line: Jōban Line
- Operator: JNR
- Incident type: Derailment and collision
- Cause: Signal passed at danger

Statistics
- Trains: 3
- Deaths: 160
- Injured: 296

The Mikawashima train crash (三河島事故, Mikawashima jiko) was a multiple train crash which occurred on 3 May 1962 near Mikawashima Station in Arakawa, Tokyo, Japan. It involved a freight train and two passenger trains; 160 people were killed.

== First train ==
At 21:36, a Mito-bound freight train (No. 287) was approaching to join the main Jōban Line at Mikawashima Station and missed the red signal. A fail-safe mechanism diverted the freight train onto a safety siding, preventing a devastating head-on collision, however the freight train was travelling too fast and derailed in the siding, leaving the JNR Class D51 locomotive, and leading tanker-wagon obstructing the main line.

== Second train ==
A seven-carriage passenger train (2117H) bound for Toride from Ueno left Mikawashima station also at 21:36, and, although it avoided a head-on collision, struck the derailed freight train; resulting in 25 injuries. The passengers used the emergency escape handles and started walking back to the station. The operators in the nearby signal box were too busy dealing with the aftermath of the first collision and failed to notify other traffic on the line.

== Third train ==
Six minutes after the first collision, an incoming passenger train (2000H) collided with the derailed 2117H and hit many of the passengers escaping from the first collision. The first carriage was smashed and the next three derailed, resulting in 160 deaths and 296 injuries.

== Response ==
As a result of the crash, JNR changed its operational policy from "do not stop trains unless absolutely necessary" to "stop trains as soon as an accident happens regardless of its scale." An Automatic train stop system to stop trains automatically if they should pass a red signal was introduced to all JNR lines by April 1966.

== See also ==
- Lists of rail accidents
