= Kumanomae Station =

Railway and tram station in Tokyo, Japan

Coordinates: 35.7490°N 139.7696°E

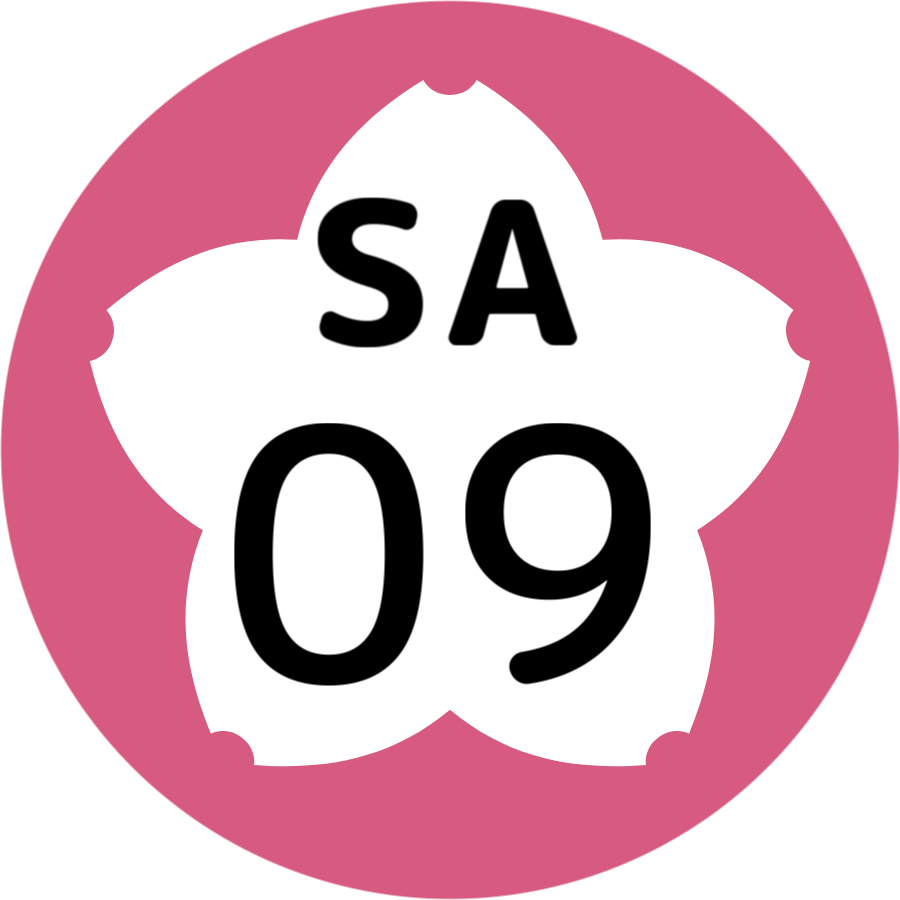
NT04 Kumanomae Station 熊野前駅

- Kumanomae station

General information
- Location: 3-37-6 Higashiogu, Arakawa, Tokyo （荒川区東尾久3-37-6） Japan
- Operator: Toei
- Lines: Nippori–Toneri Liner; Toden Arakawa Line
- Platforms: 1 island platform (Nippori-Toneri Liner); 2 side platforms (Toden Akawara)
- Tracks: 4 (2 for each line)

Construction
- Structure type: Elevated (Nippori-Toneri Liner); At grade (Toden Arakawa)

Other information
- Station code: NT-04 (Nippori-Toneri Liner), SA-09 (Toden Arakawa)

History
- Opened: 1 April 1913; 113 years ago

Services
Preceding station	Toei	Following station
Adachi-odai NT05 towards Minumadai-shinsuikōen	Nippori–Toneri Liner	Akado-shōgakkōmae NT03 towards Nippori
Miyanomae towards Waseda	Toden Arakawa Line	Higashi-ogu-sanchome towards Minowabashi
Location
- Location within Special wards of Tokyo Location within Tokyo Bay and Bōsō Peninsula Location within Tokyo Location within Japan

Kumanomae Station (熊野前駅, Kumanomae-eki) is a railway station in Arakawa, Tokyo, Japan, operated by Tokyo Metropolitan Bureau of Transportation (Toei).

== Lines ==
Kumanomae Station is served by the following two lines.

- Nippori-Toneri Liner
- Tokyo Sakura Tram

== Station Layout ==
The Nippori-Toneri Liner elevated station consists of a single island platform serving two tracks.

== History ==
The station opened on 1 April 1913 as a tram stop on the Arakawa Line. The Nippori-Toneri Liner station opened on 30 March 2008 with the opening of the Nippori Toneri Liner.

Station numbering was introduced in November 2017 with Kumanomae receiving station number NT04 for the Nippori-Toneri Liner and SA09 for the Toden Arakawa Line.

== Surrounding area ==
- Tokyo Metropolitan University Arakawa Campus
- Ogunohara Park
- Sumida River

== See also ==
- List of railway stations in Japan
