= Tokyo Metropolitan Junior College of Aeronautic Engineering =

- 東京都立航空工業短期大学
- Type: public
- Established: 1960
- Location: Arakawa, Tokyo, Japan

The Tokyo Metropolitan Junior College of Aeronautic Engineering (東京都立航空工業短期大学, Tokyo Toritsu Kōkū Kōgyō Tanki Daigaku) was a public junior college in Arakawa, Tokyo, Japan.

== History ==
The Tokyo Metropolitan Junior College of Aeronautic Engineering was established in 1960. In 1972, it merged with the Tokyo Metropolitan Technical College, and closed in 1975.

== Academic departments ==
- Aeronautical engineering
