= Arakawa-itchūmae Station =

Tram station in Tokyo, Japan

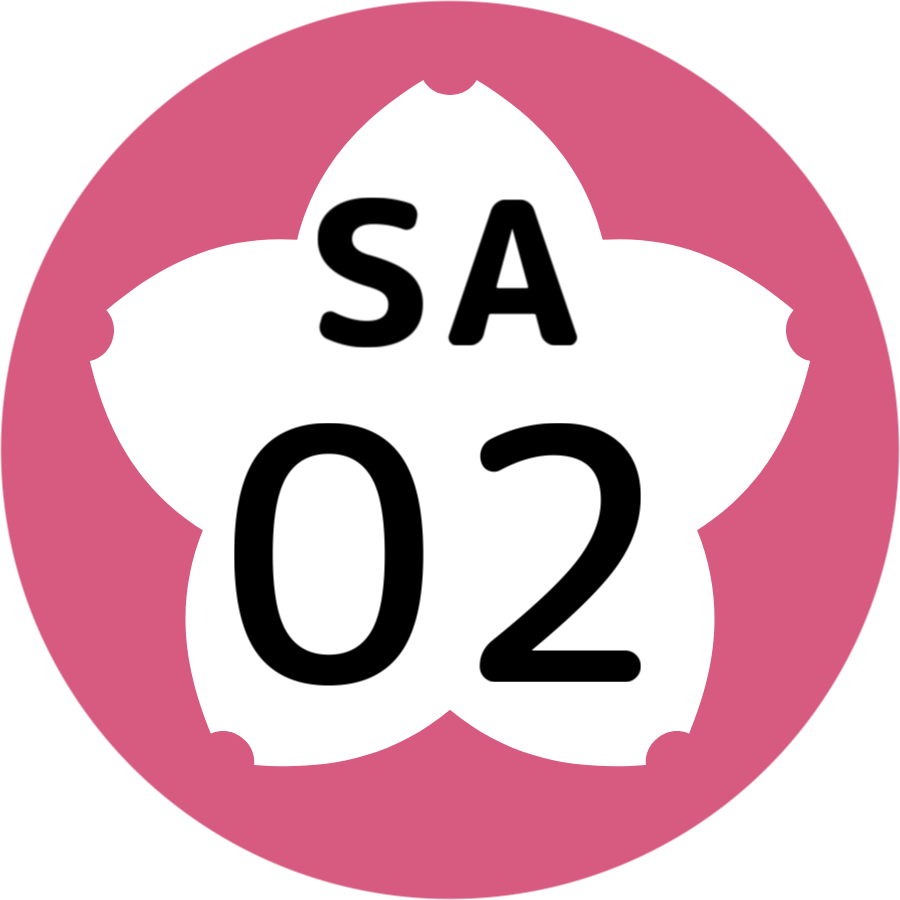
Arakawa-itchūmae Station 荒川一中前停留場

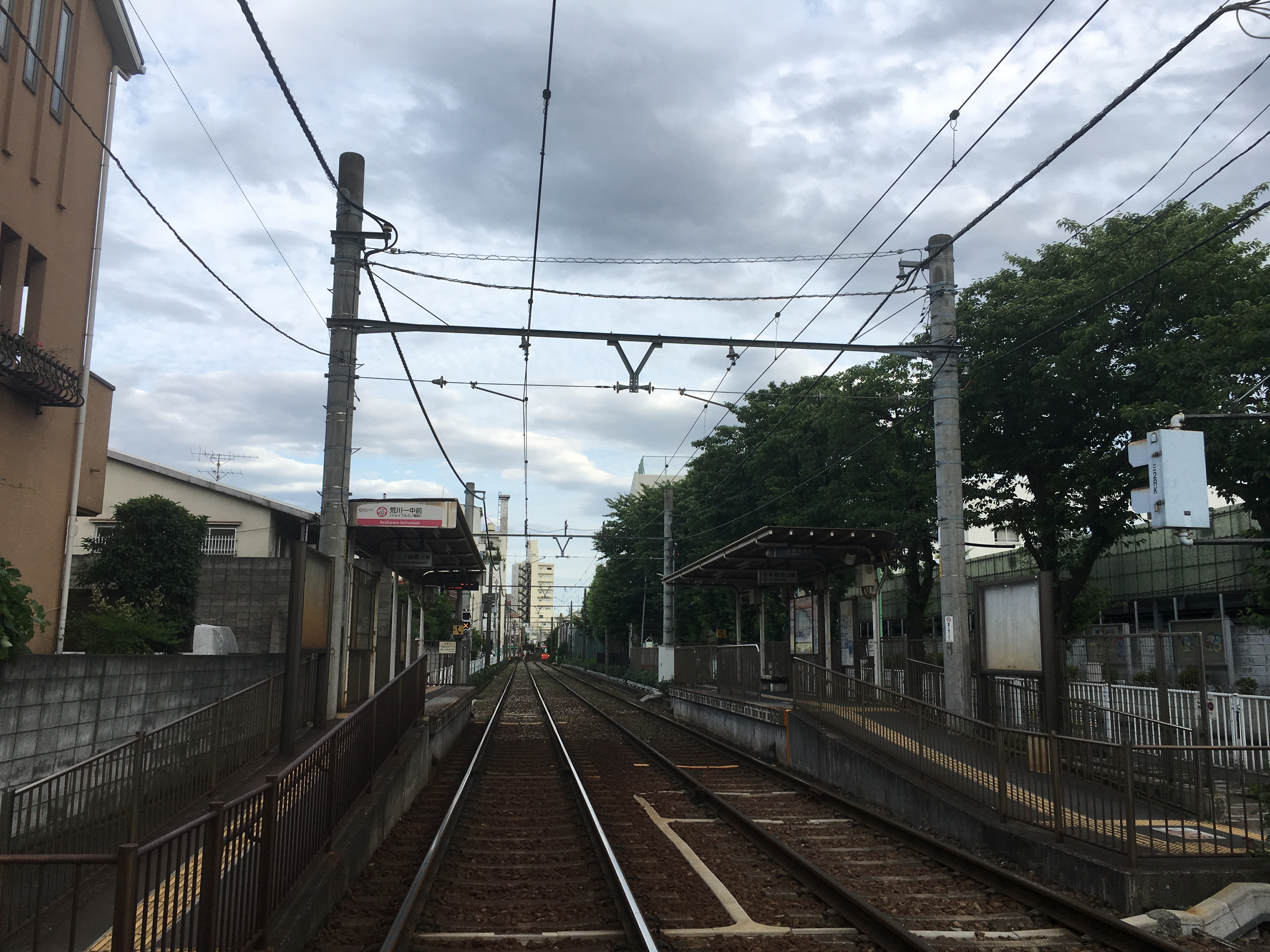
- Station platforms in June 2019

General information
- Other names: Joyful-Minowa-mae
- Location: 1-chome Minamisenju, Arakawa, Tokyo; Japan
- Coordinates: 35°44′1.4″N 139°47′20″E
- Operator: Toei
- Line: Toden Arakawa Line
- Platforms: 2 side platforms
- Tracks: 2

Construction
- Structure type: At grade

Other information
- Station code: SA02

History
- Opened: 11 November 2000; 25 years ago

Services
Preceding station	Toei	Following station
Arakawa-kuyakushomae towards Waseda	Toden Arakawa Line	Minowabashi Terminus
Location
- Location within Special wards of Tokyo Location within Tokyo Bay and Bōsō Peninsula Location within Tokyo Location within Japan

Arakawa-itchūmae Station (荒川一中前停留場, Arakawa-itchūmae-teiryūjō) is a tram station operated by Toei's Tokyo Sakura Tram located in Arakawa, Tokyo Japan. It is 0.3 kilometres from the terminus of the Tokyo Sakura Tram at Minowabashi Station.

== Layout ==
Arakawa-itchūmae Station has two opposed side platforms.

== Surrounding area ==
- Arakawa Municipal Dai-ichi Junior High School
- Joyful Minowa (traditional shopping arcade)

== History ==
- 11 November 2000: Station opened
