= Shim-Mikawashima Station =

Railway station in Tokyo, Japan

KS03 Shim-Mikawashima Station 新三河島駅
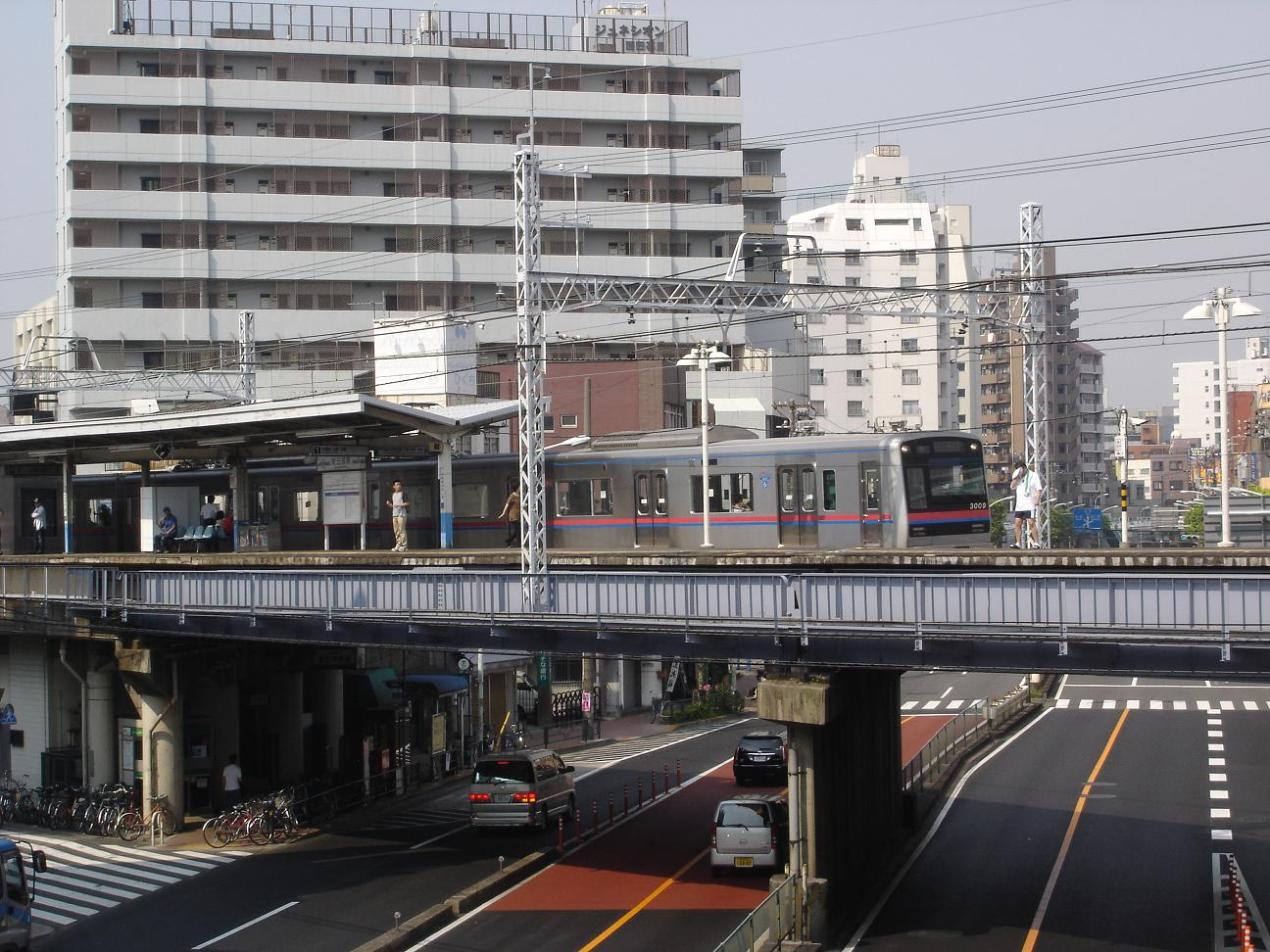
- Shim-Mikawashima Station in September 2005

General information
- Location: 6 Nishi-Nippori, Arakawa-ku, Tokyo; Japan
- Coordinates: 35°44′14″N 139°46′26″E
- Operator: Keisei Electric Railway
- Line: Keisei Main Line
- Distance: 3.4 km from Keisei Ueno
- Platforms: 1 island platform
- Tracks: 2

Other information
- Station code: KS03

History
- Opened: 19 December 1931

Passengers
- FY2015: 5,468 daily

Services
| Preceding station | Keisei | Following station |
|---|---|---|
| Nippori KS02 towards Keisei Ueno | Main Line Local | Machiya KS04 towards Narita Airport Terminal 1 |
Location
- Location within Tokyo

Shim-Mikawashima Station (新三河島駅, Shin-Mikawashima-eki) is a railway station on the Keisei Main Line in Arakawa, Tokyo, Japan, operated by the private railway operator Keisei Electric Railway.

== Lines ==
Shim-Mikawashima Station is served by the Keisei Main Line, and is located 3.4 km from the starting point of the line at Keisei Ueno Station. Only "Local" all-stations services stop at this station.

== Layout ==
This station consists of a single elevated island platform serving two tracks.

=== Platforms ===
| 1 | Keisei Main Line | for Keisei Ueno |
| 2 | Keisei Main Line | for Keisei Takasago, Keisei Kanamachi, Keisei Funabashi, Chiharadai, Keisei Narita, and Narita Airport (Terminal 2·3 and Terminal 1) |

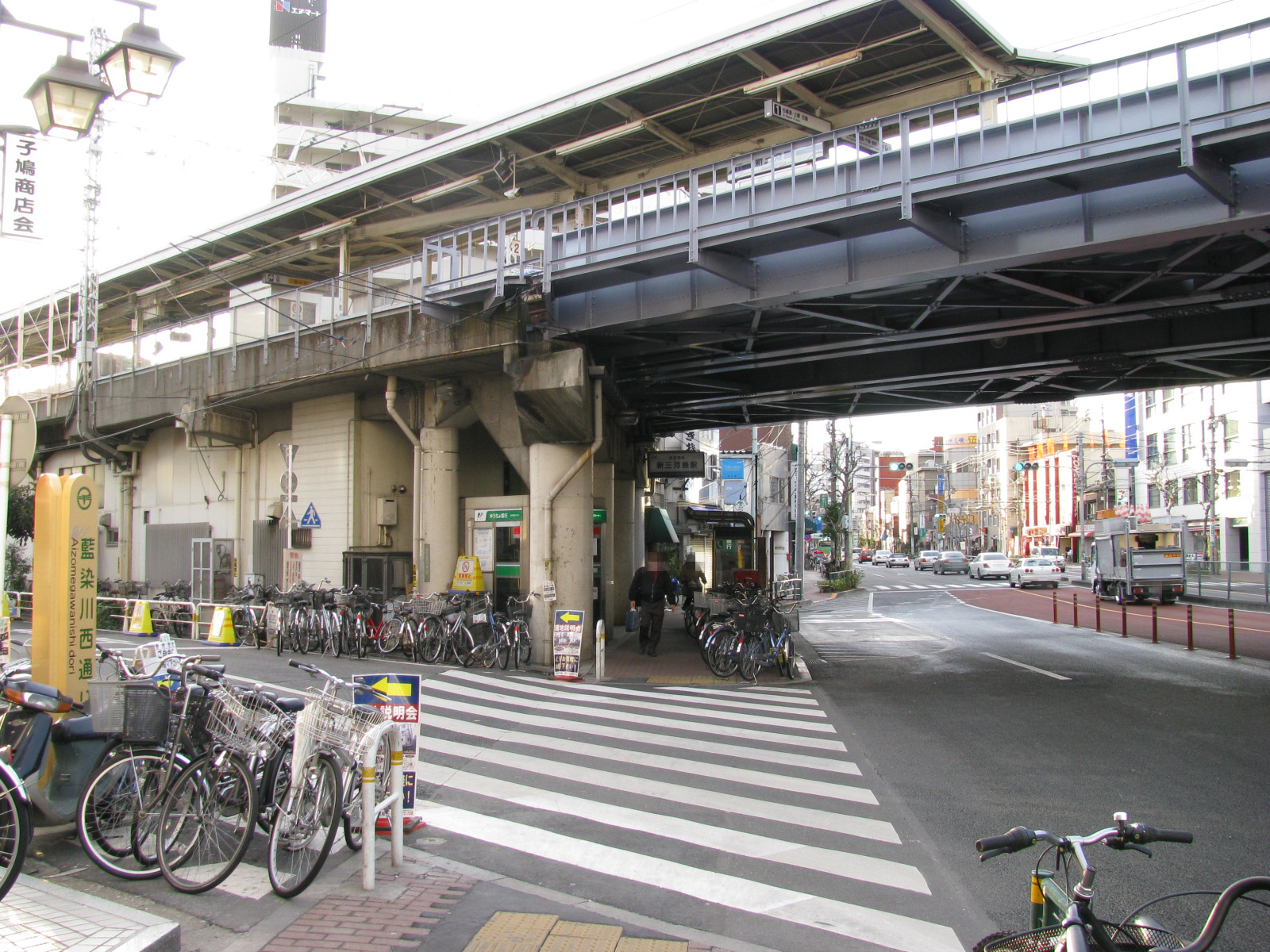
The station entrance in February 2008

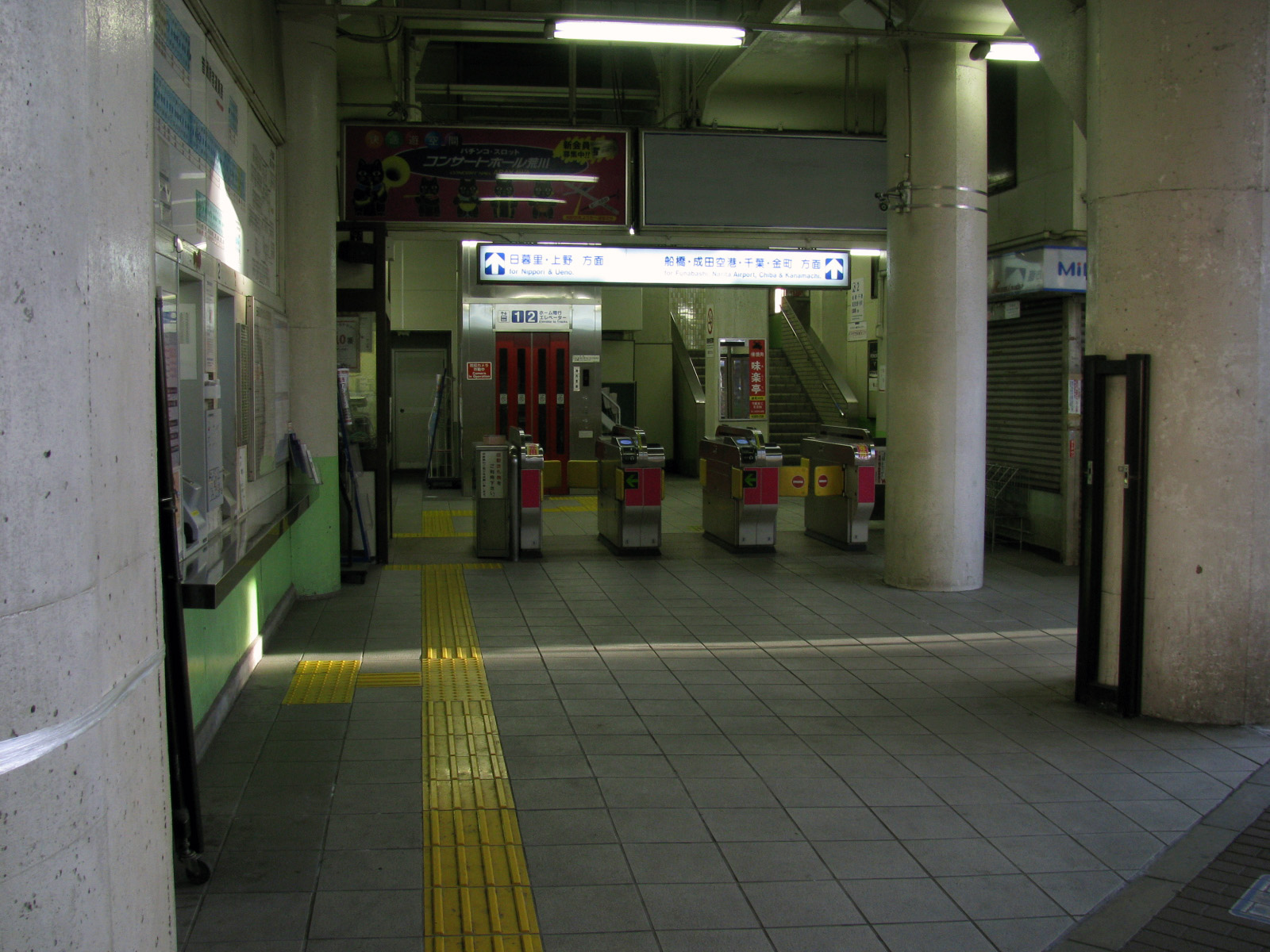
The ticket barriers in February 2008

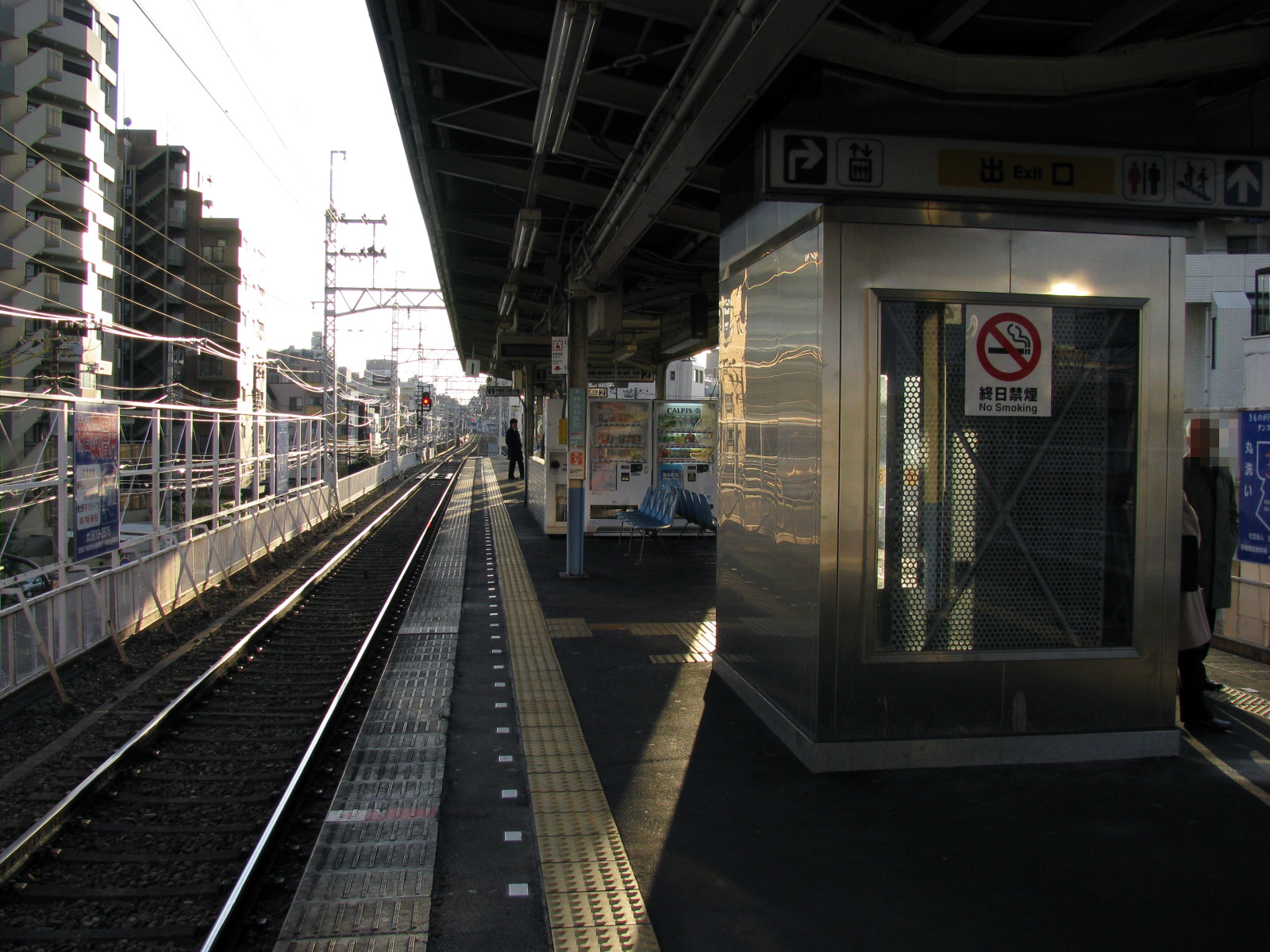
The platform in February 2008

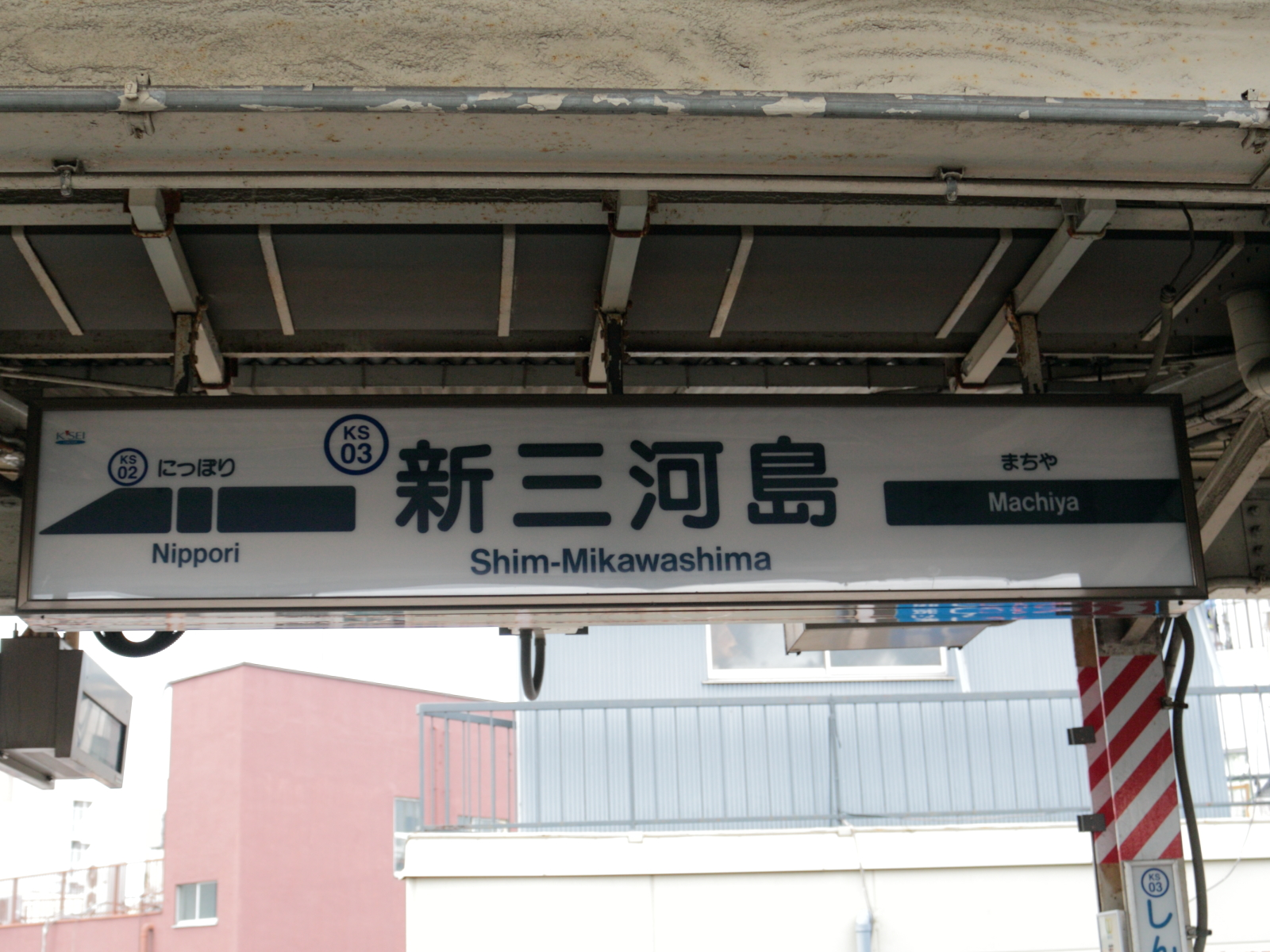
The station sign in March 2016

== History ==
Shim-Mikawashima station opened on 19 December 1931.

Station numbering was introduced to all Keisei Line stations on 17 June 2010. Shim-Mikawashima was assigned station number KS03.

== See also ==
- List of railway stations in Japan
