= Mikawashima Station =

Railway station in Arakawa, Tokyo, Japan

Coordinates: 35.7336°N 139.7771°E

JJ03 Mikawashima Station 三河島駅
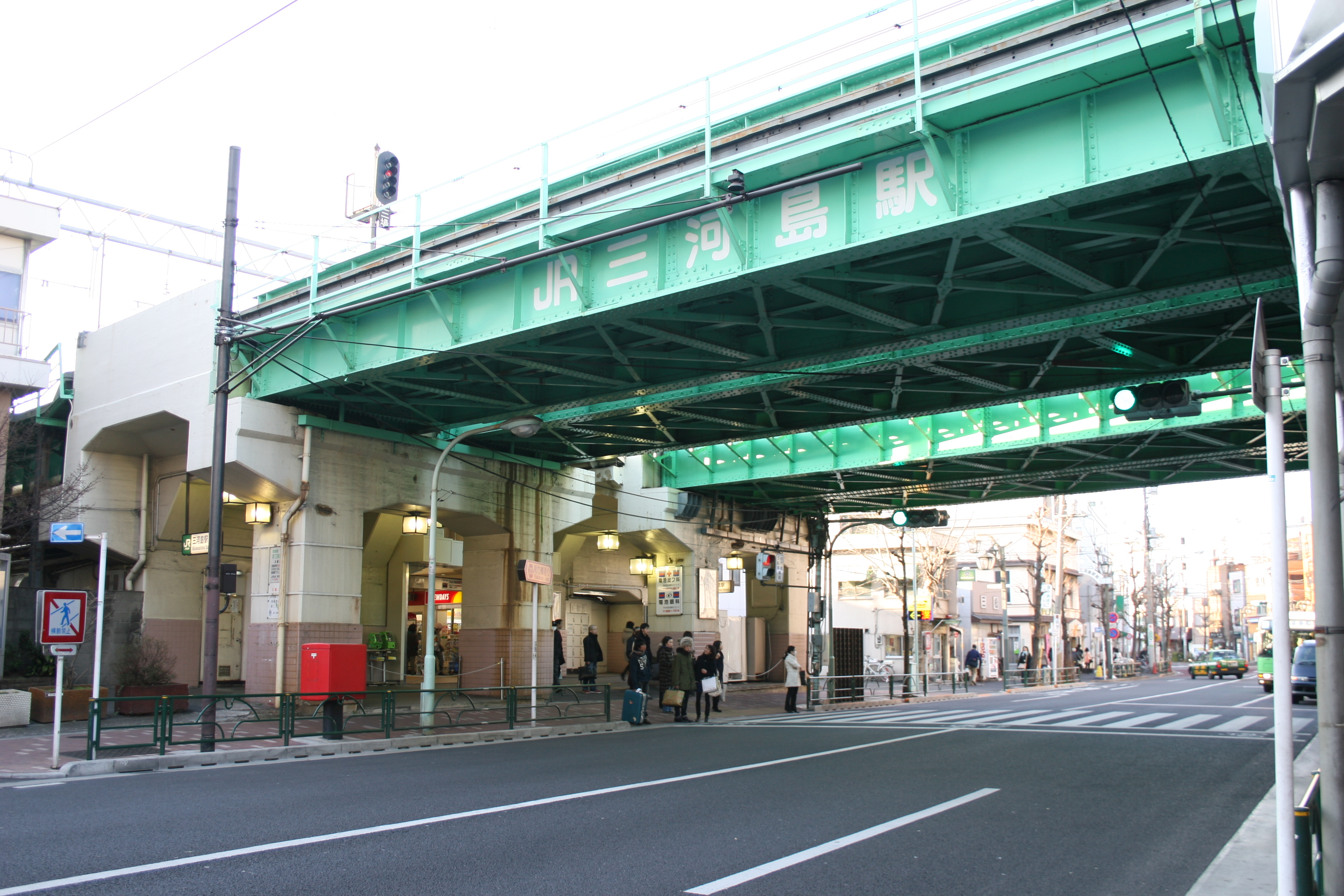
- Station entrance under elevated tracks

General information
- Location: 1 Nishinippori, Arakawa, Tokyo （東京都荒川区西日暮里1丁目） Japan
- Operator: JR East
- Line: Jōban Line (Rapid)

History
- Opened: 1905

Services
Preceding station	JR East	Following station
Nippori towards Shinagawa	Jōban Line (Rapid) Rapid	Minami-Senju JJ04 towards Toride
Nippori towards Shinagawa	Jōban Line Local-Futsuu	Minami-Senju JJ04 towards Sendai
Location

Mikawashima Station (三河島駅, Mikawashima-eki) is a railway station on the Jōban Line in Arakawa, Tokyo, Japan, operated by East Japan Railway Company (JR East).

== Lines ==
Mikawashima Station is served by the Jōban Line.

== Station layout ==
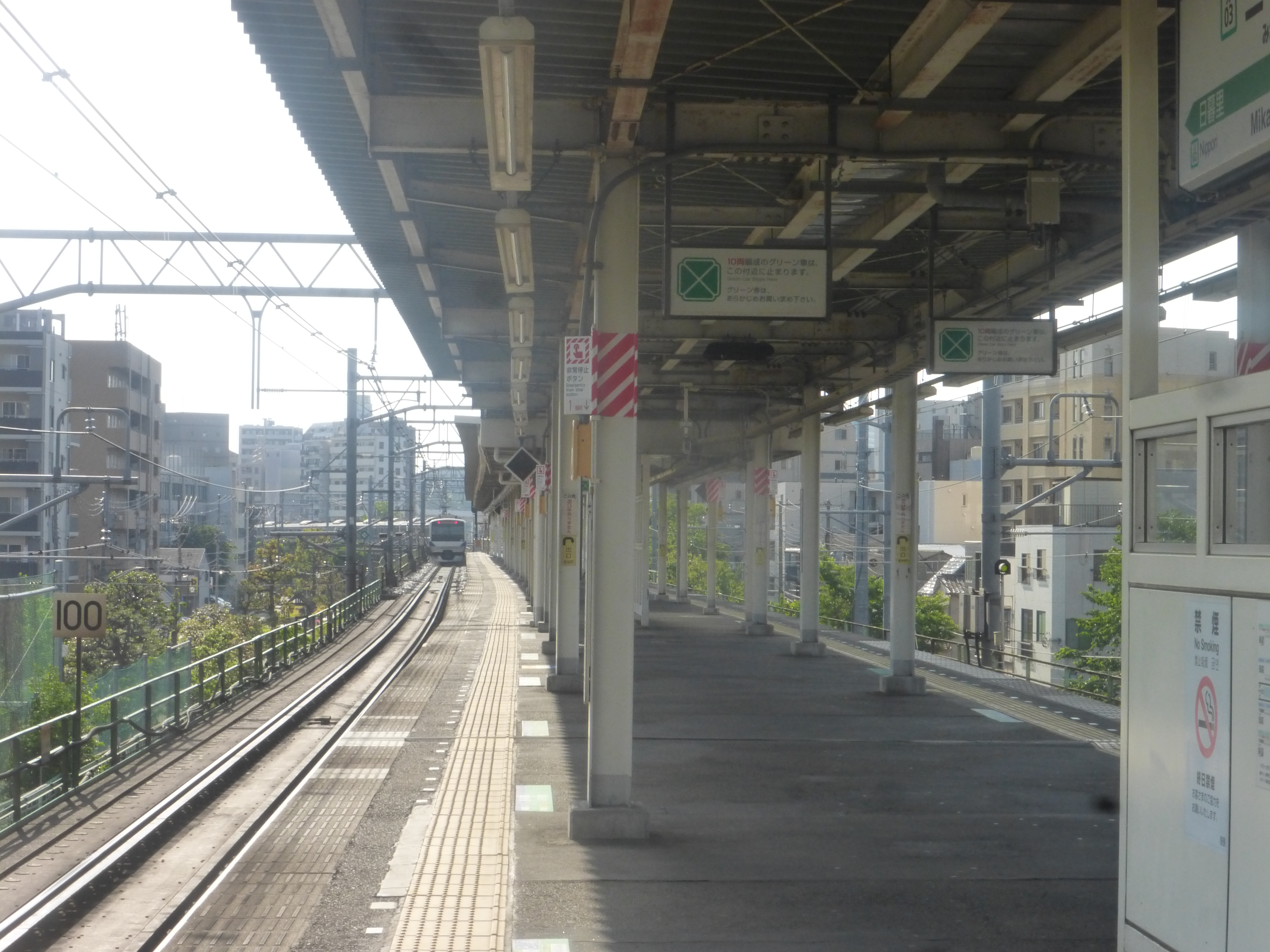
The station platform, April 2018

The station consists of a single island platform serving two tracks.

1	Jōban Line (Rapid)	for Nippori, Ueno; Ueno-Tokyo Line for Tokyo and Shinagawa
2	Jōban Line (Rapid)	for Kita-Senju, Kashiwa, Toride, Tsuchiura, Ishioka and Mito ■ Narita Line for Narita

== History ==
Mikawashima Station opened on 1 April 1905.

== Accident ==
On 3 May 1962, there was a crash between a freight train and two passenger trains which resulted in 160 deaths and 296 injuries. The crash occurred about 350 meters east of Mikawashima Station when an Ueno-bound passenger train (train number 2000H) crashed into the wreckage of a crash between a Toride-bound passenger train (2117H) and a Mito-bound freight train (number 287) as well as a crowd of evacuating passengers from 2117H.

== Surrounding area ==
- Shim-Mikawashima Station (Keisei Main Line)
