= Tokyo Metropolitan Technical College =

- 東京都立工業短期大学
- Type: Public
- Active: 1954–1975
- Location: Shinagawa, Tokyo, Japan

Tokyo Metropolitan Technical College (東京都立工業短期大学, Tōkyō Toritsu Kogyō Tanki Daigaku) was a public junior college in Shinagawa, Tokyo, Japan.

== Academic departments ==
- Mechanical engineering
- Electrical engineering
- Product management

== See also ==
- Tokyo Metropolitan University
- Tokyo Metropolitan Junior College of Aeronautic Engineering
