= Senjuōhashi Station =

Railway station in Tokyo, Japan

Coordinates: 35.7425°N 139.7968°E

KS05 Senjuōhashi Station 千住大橋駅
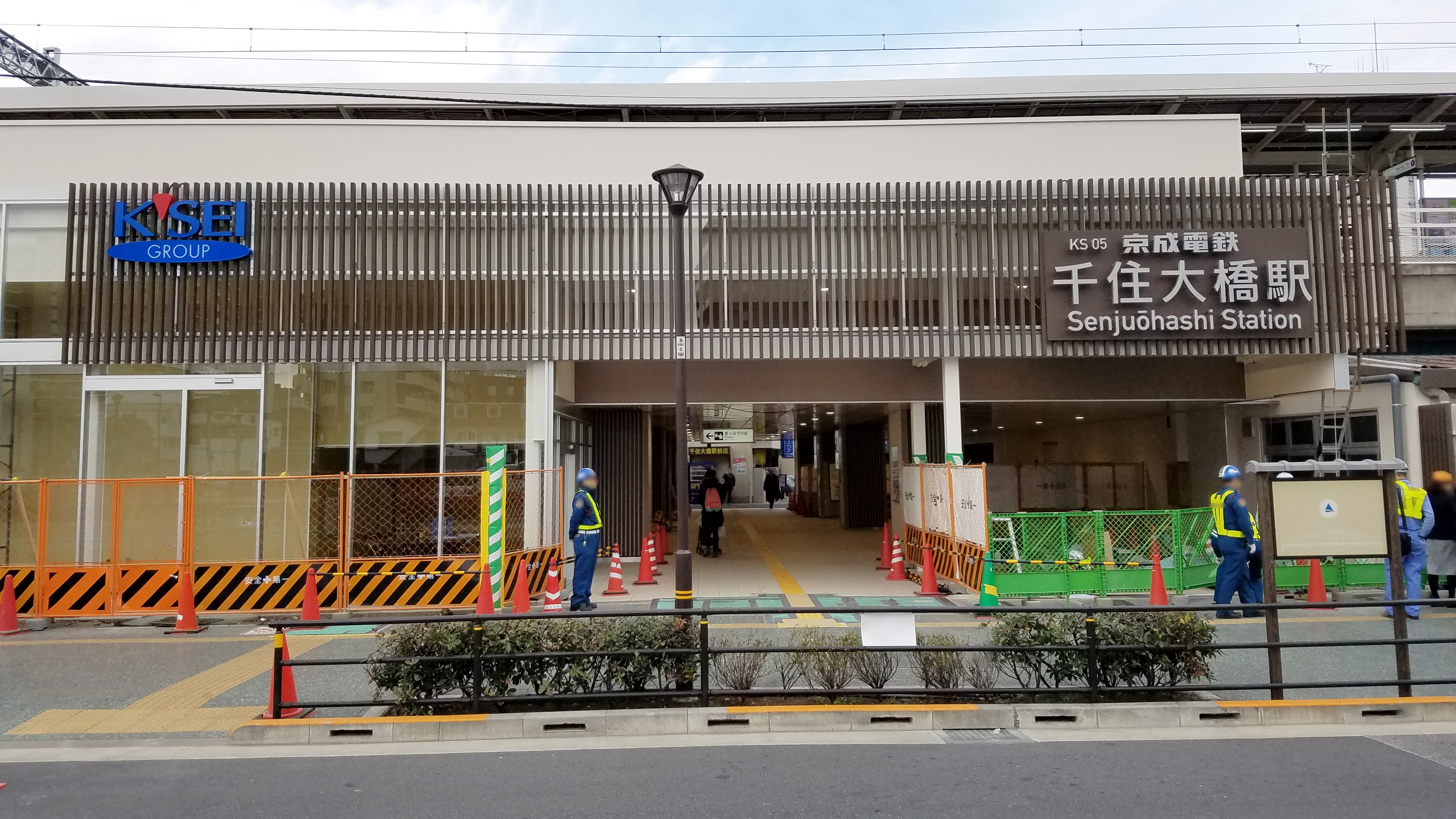
- The south entrance in March 2017

General information
- Location: 11-1 Senju-hashido-cho, Adachi-ku, Tokyo; Japan
- Operator: Keisei Electric Railway
- Line: Keisei Main Line
- Distance: 5.9 km from Keisei Ueno
- Platforms: 2 island platforms
- Tracks: 4

Other information
- Station code: KS05
- Website: Official website

History
- Opened: 19 December 1931

Passengers
- FY2015: 14,496 daily

Services
Preceding station	Keisei	Following station
Nippori KS02 towards Keisei Ueno	Main Line Rapid	Aoto KS09 towards Narita Airport Terminal 1
Machiya KS04 towards Keisei Ueno	Main Line Local	Keisei Sekiya KS06 towards Narita Airport Terminal 1
Location
- Location within Tokyo

Senjuōhashi Station (千住大橋駅, Senjuōhashi-eki) is a railway station on the Keisei Main Line in Adachi, Tokyo, Japan, operated by the private railway operator Keisei Electric Railway.

== Lines ==
Senjuōhashi Station is served by the Keisei Main Line, and lies 5.9 km from the starting point of the line at Keisei Ueno.

== Layout ==
This station consists of two island platforms serving four tracks.

=== Platforms ===
1, 2	Keisei Main Line	for Machiya, Nippori, and Keisei Ueno
3, 4	Keisei Main Line	for Aoto, Keisei Funabashi, Keisei Chiba, Keisei Narita, and Narita Airport (Terminal 2·3 and Terminal 1)

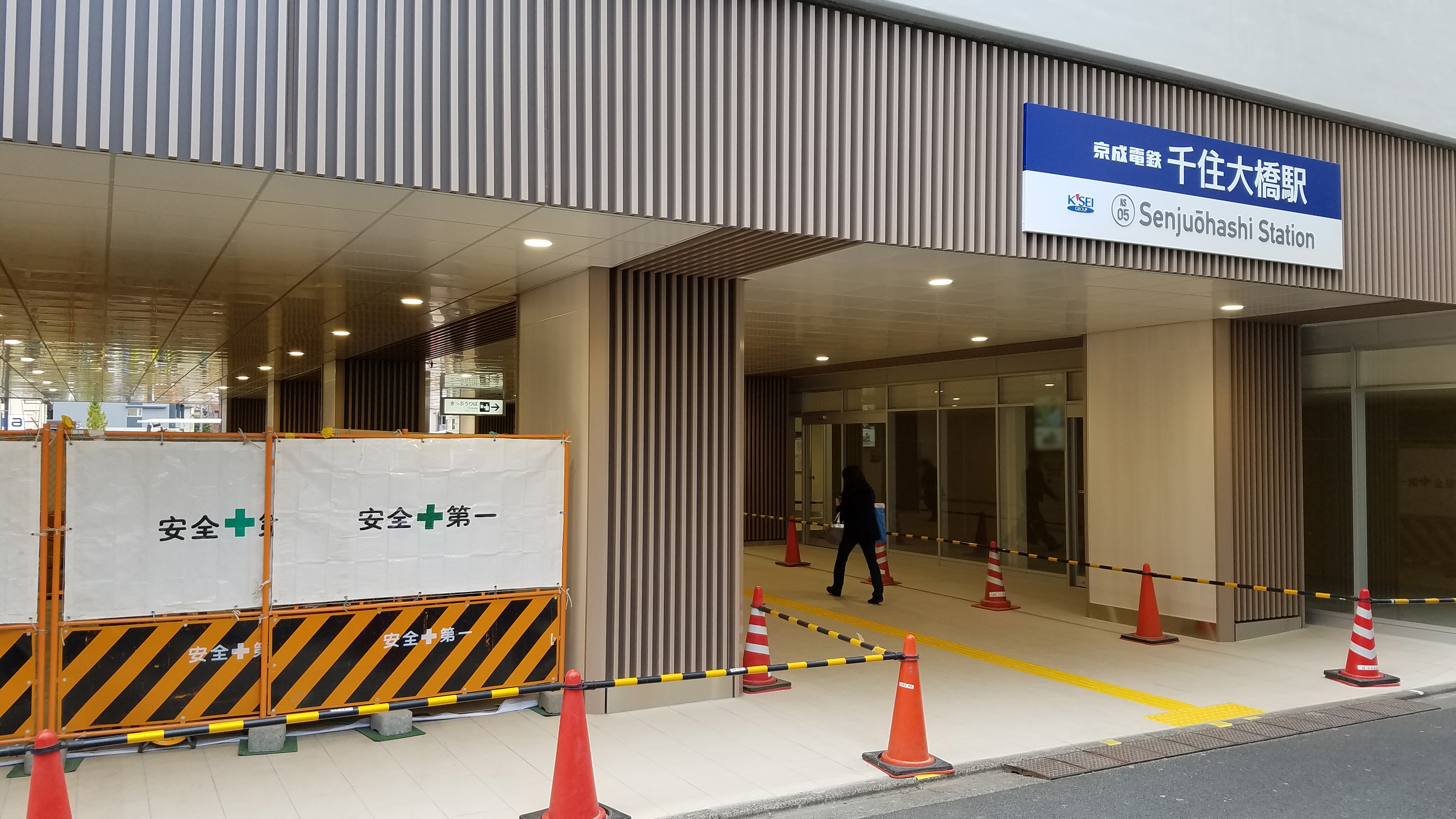
The north entrance in March 2017

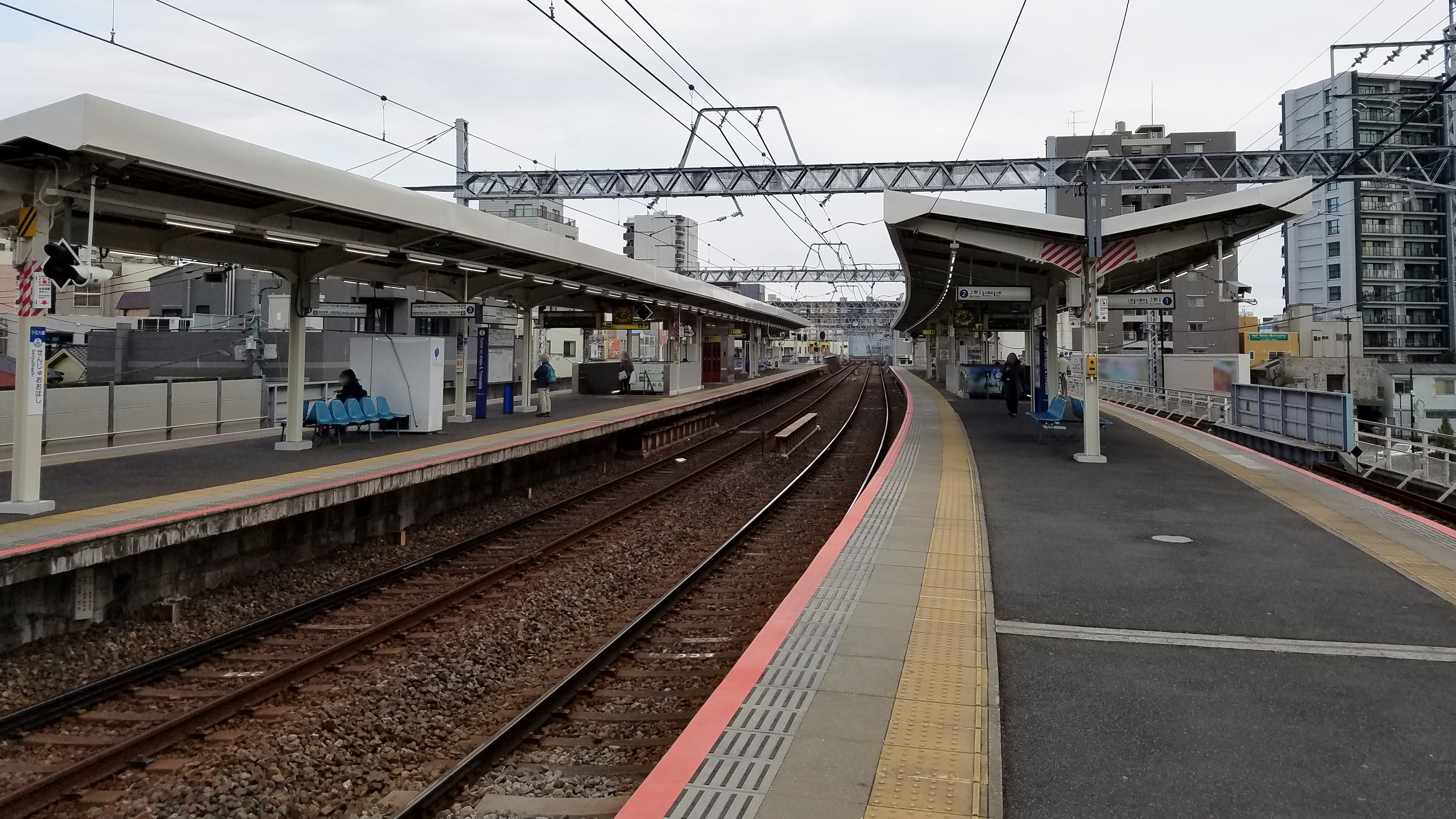
The platforms in March 2017

== History ==
The station opened on 19 December 1931.

Station numbering was introduced to all Keisei Line stations on 17 June 2010. Senjuōhashi was assigned station number KS05.

== Surrounding area ==
- Tokyo University of the Arts

== See also ==
- List of railway stations in Japan
