= Minowabashi Station =

Tram station in Tokyo, Japan

Coordinates: 35°43′56″N 139°47′30″E

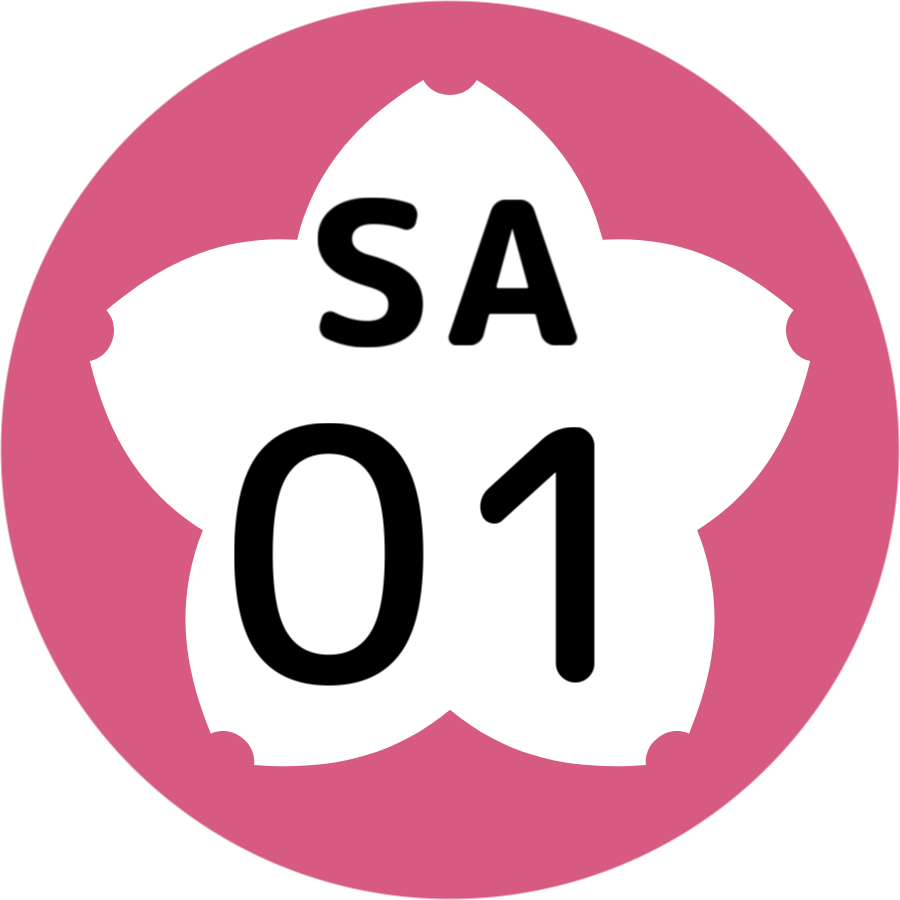
Minowabashi Station 三ノ輪橋停留場

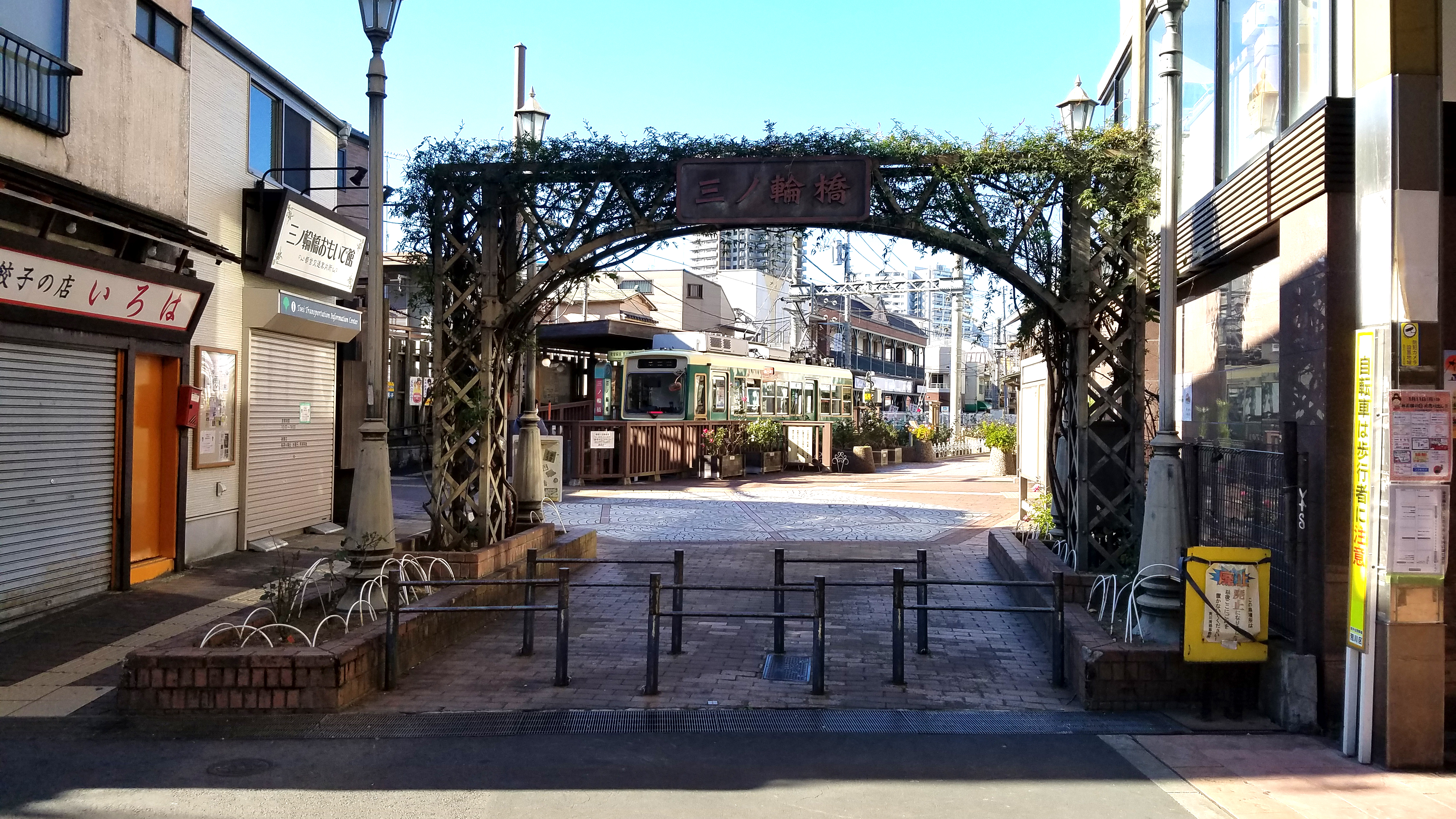
- The entrance in January 2021

General information
- Location: Arakawa, Tokyo; Japan
- Operator: Toei
- Line: Toden Arakawa Line
- Platforms: 2 side platforms
- Tracks: 2
- Connections: Minowa

Construction
- Structure type: At grade

Other information
- Station code: SA01

History
- Opened: 1 April 1913; 113 years ago

Services
Preceding station	Toei	Following station
Arakawa-itchumae towards Waseda	Toden Arakawa Line	Terminus
Location
- Location within Special wards of Tokyo Location within Tokyo Bay and Bōsō Peninsula Location within Tokyo Location within Japan

Minowabashi Station (三ノ輪橋停留場, Minowabashi-teiryūjō) is a station on the Tokyo Sakura Tram. This is the terminus of the line. It is close to Minowa Station on the Tokyo Metro Hibiya Line.

== Lines ==
- Tokyo Sakura Tram

== Surrounding area ==
- Minowa Station ( Tokyo Metro Hibiya Line) (approximately 5 minutes walk)
