= Arakawa, Tokyo =

Arakawa 荒川区
- Special ward
- Arakawa City
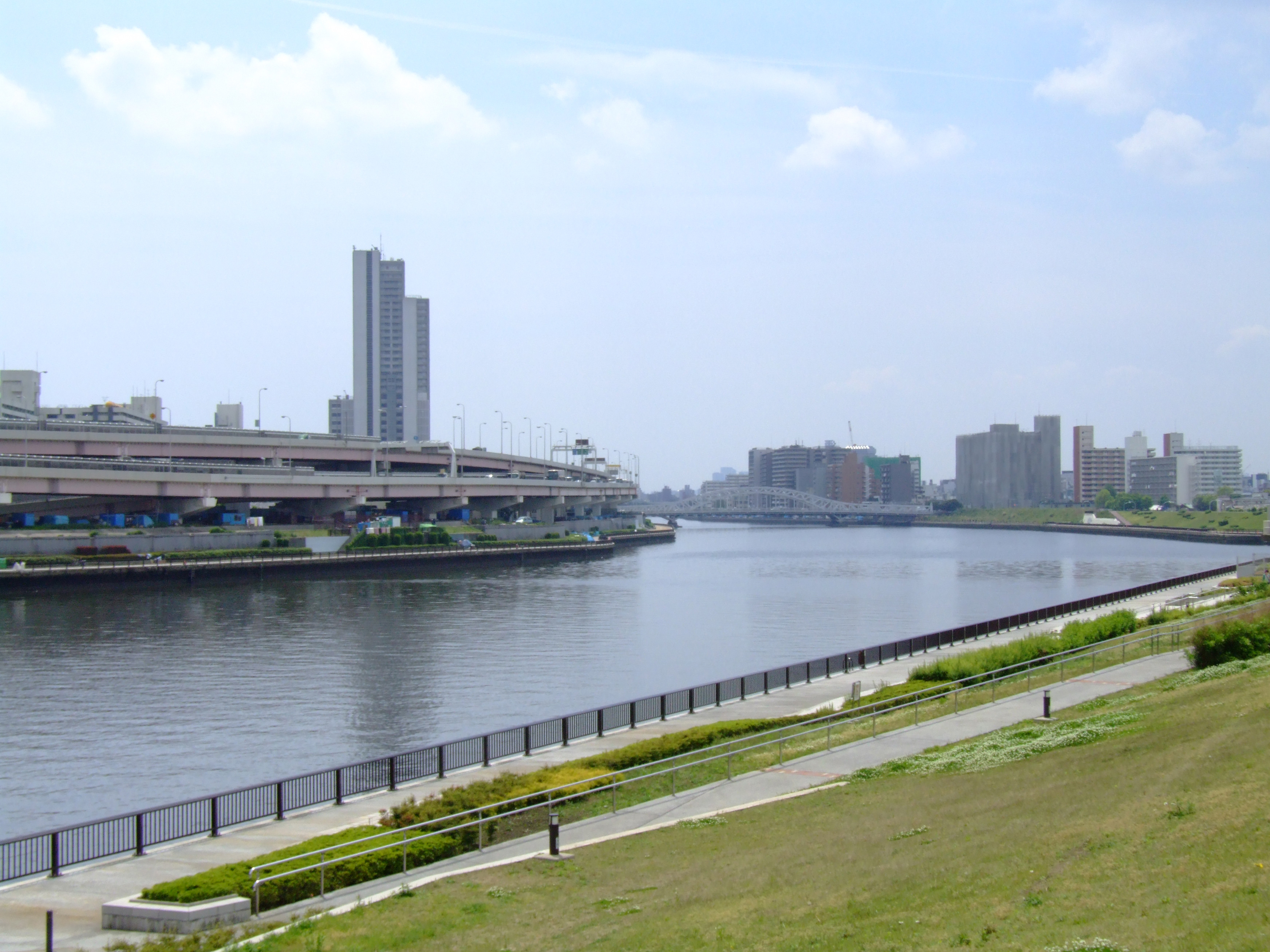
- Sumida River from Suijin Bridge in Arakawa

- Flag Emblem

- Location of Arakawa in Tokyo Metropolis

- Location in Japan
- Coordinates: 35°44′N 139°47′E
- Country: Japan
- Region: Kantō
- Prefecture: Tokyo Metropolis

Government
  - Mayor: Gaku Takiguchi (since November 2024)

Area
  - Total: 10.16 km^{2} (3.92 sq mi)

Population (December 1, 2022)
  - Total: 216,900
  - Density: 21,348/km^{2} (55,290/sq mi)
- Time zone: UTC+09:00 (JST)
- City hall address: Arakawa 2-2-3, Arakawa-ku, Tokyo; 116-8501
- Website: www.city.arakawa.tokyo.jp
- Symbols
- Flower: Azalea
- Tree: Cherry blossom

Arakawa (荒川区, Arakawa-ku; Japanese pronunciation: [ä̀.ɾä́.kä́.β̞ä́(.kɯ̈̀)]) is a special ward in the Tokyo Metropolis in Japan. The ward takes its name from the Arakawa River, though the river does not run through or touch the ward. The ward borders the Sumida River, which was once the lower section of the Arakawa River. Neighboring wards are Adachi, Kita, Bunkyo, Taito and Sumida. In English, the ward's official name is Arakawa City.

Arakawa has sister-city relationships with Donaustadt in Vienna, Austria, and with Corvallis, Oregon, U.S. Domestically, it has similar relationships with nine cities, towns and villages.

As of May 1, 2015, the ward has an estimated population of 208,763, and a population density of about 20,550 persons per km^{2}. The total area is 10.16 km^{2}.

== Geography ==
Arakawa is in the northeastern part of Tokyo. The shape is long and narrow, stretching from west to east. The Sumida River forms the northern boundary.

The ward is surrounded by five other special wards. To the north lies Adachi; to the west, Kita; to the southwest, Bunkyo. South of Arakawa is Taito, and southeast is Sumida.

== Demographics ==
Historical population
Year	Pop.	±%
1920	121,419	—
1930	280,616	+131.1%
1940	351,281	+25.2%
1945	87,327	−75.1%
1950	201,248	+130.5%
1960	285,480	+41.9%
1970	247,013	−13.5%
1980	198,126	−19.8%
1990	184,809	−6.7%
2000	180,468	−2.3%
2010	203,296	+12.6%
2020	217,475	+7.0%
Source: Censuses (Note: For years prior to 1930, figures cover the area of present-day Arakawa-ku.)

== History ==
The area was mainly agricultural in the Edo period. In 1651, Kozukappara, the Tokugawa's largest execution ground (now located next to Minami-Senju station), was built. Beginning in the Meiji era, the area became industrial as factories were built on the waterfront. In 1932, it became one of the 35 wards of Tokyo City.

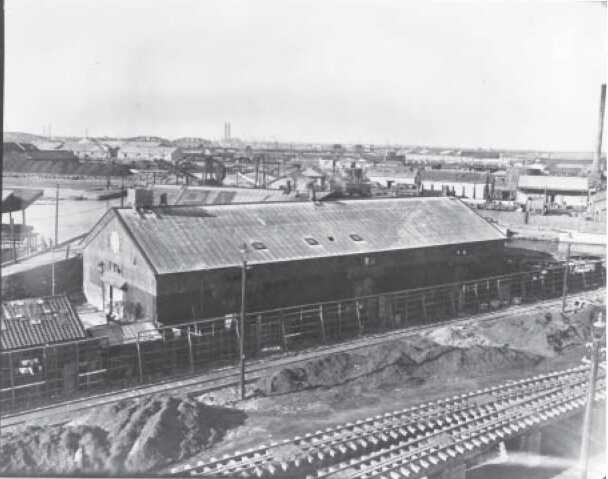
Tokyo #10-B Prisoner of War Camp

On 1 July 1944, during World War II, the Imperial Japanese Army established the #20-B prisoner-of-war camp on the grounds near Hashiba Bridge, Minami-Senju, at the current day location with the address of 3-41 Minami-Senju, Arakawa. The camp was renamed to #10-B in August 1945. The prisoners were liberated in September 1945. At the time, there were 256 prisoners of war (87 British, 64 American, 55 Canadian and 50 Dutch) held at the camp. Two prisoners died during their imprisonment.

Other events:

- Sada Abe incident (1936)
- Mikawashima train crash (1962)
- The attempted assassination of the head of the National Police Agency following an investigation of Aum Shinrikyo-related facilities (1995)

== Districts and neighborhoods ==
Mikawashima Area

- Arakawa
- Higashinippori^{a}
- Machiya^{b}

Minamisenju Area

- Minamisenju

Nippori Area

- Nishinippori
- Higashinippori^{c}

Ogu Area

- Higashiogu
- Nishiogu
- Machiya^{d}

Notes:

^{a} - (1-chōme)
^{b} - (1, 2, 3, 4 & 8-chōme)
^{c} - (2, 3, 4, 5, 6, 7, 8-chōme)
^{d} - (5, 6, 7-chōme)

== Notable people ==
- Kosuke Kitajima (Olympic gold-medalist in swimming)
- Kanako Watanabe (Olympic athlete in swimming)
- Hibari Misora (singer)
- Momoe Yamaguchi (singer, actress)
- Eri Kamei (singer)
- Toru Yano (Professional wrestler)
- Seiya Suzuki (MLB Player)
- Akira Yoshimura (Writer)
- Setsuko Tsumura (Writer)

== Economy ==
MIAT Mongolian Airlines's Tokyo Branch Office is on the fifth floor in the Tachibana Building in Arakawa. Iseki, a tractor and engine equipment manufacturer has its Tokyo head office in the ward. Nippori Fabric Town, is known for a concentration of shops specializing in fabric and textiles.

== Landmarks ==
- Arakawa Nature Park
- Shimogoindenbashi Bridge - A notable viewing point for trains and rail enthusiasts
- Shushoin Temple
- Seiunji Temple
- Honyoji Temple

== Education ==
Metropolitan high schools are operated by the Tokyo Metropolitan Government Board of Education.

- Arakawa Technical High School
- Takenodai High School

Private schools:

- Kaisei Academy
- Kitatoshima Junior and Senior High School

Public elementary and junior high schools are operated by the Arakawa City Board of Education (荒川区教育委員会).

Municipal junior high schools:

- No. 1 Junior High School (第一中学校)
- No. 3 Junior High School (第三中学校)
- No. 4 Junior High School (第四中学校)
- No. 5 Junior High School (第五中学校)
- No. 7 Junior High School (第七中学校)
- No. 9 Junior High School (第九中学校)
- Hara Junior High School (原中学校)
- Minamisenju No. 2 Junior High School (南千住第二中学校)
- Ogu Hachiman Junior High School (尾久八幡中学校)
- Suwadai Junior High School (諏訪台中学校)

Municipal elementary schools:

- No. 2 Haketa Elementary School (第二峡田小学校)
- No. 3 Haketa Elementary School (第三峡田小学校)
- No. 4 Haketa Elementary School (第四峡田小学校)
- No. 5 Haketa Elementary School (第五峡田小学校)
- No. 7 Haketa Elementary School (第七峡田小学校)
- No. 9 Haketa Elementary School (第九峡田小学校)
- No. 1 Nippori Elementary School (第一日暮里小学校)
- No. 2 Nippori Elementary School (第二日暮里小学校)
- No. 3 Nippori Elementary School (第三日暮里小学校)
- No. 6 Nippori Elementary School (第六日暮里小学校)
- No. 2 Zuiko Elementary School (第二瑞光小学校)
- No. 3 Zuiko Elementary School (第三瑞光小学校)
- No. 6 Zuiko Elementary School (第六瑞光小学校)
- Akado Elementary School (赤土小学校)
- Daimon Elementary School (大門小学校)
- Haketa Elementary School (峡田小学校)
- Higurashi Elementary School (ひぐらし小学校)
- Ogu Elementary School (尾久小学校)
- Ogu No. 6 Elementary School (尾久第六小学校)
- Ogu Miyamae Elementary School (尾久宮前小学校)
- Ogu Nishi Elementary School (尾久西小学校)
- Shioiri Elementary School (汐入小学校)
- Shioiri Higashi Elementary School (汐入東小学校)
- Zuiko Elementary School (瑞光小学校)

The Tokyo First Korean Elementary and Junior High School (東京朝鮮第一初中級学校), a North Korean school, is in the ward.

The metropolis operated the Tokyo Metropolitan College of Aeronautical Engineering in Arakawa until 2010.

== Transportation ==
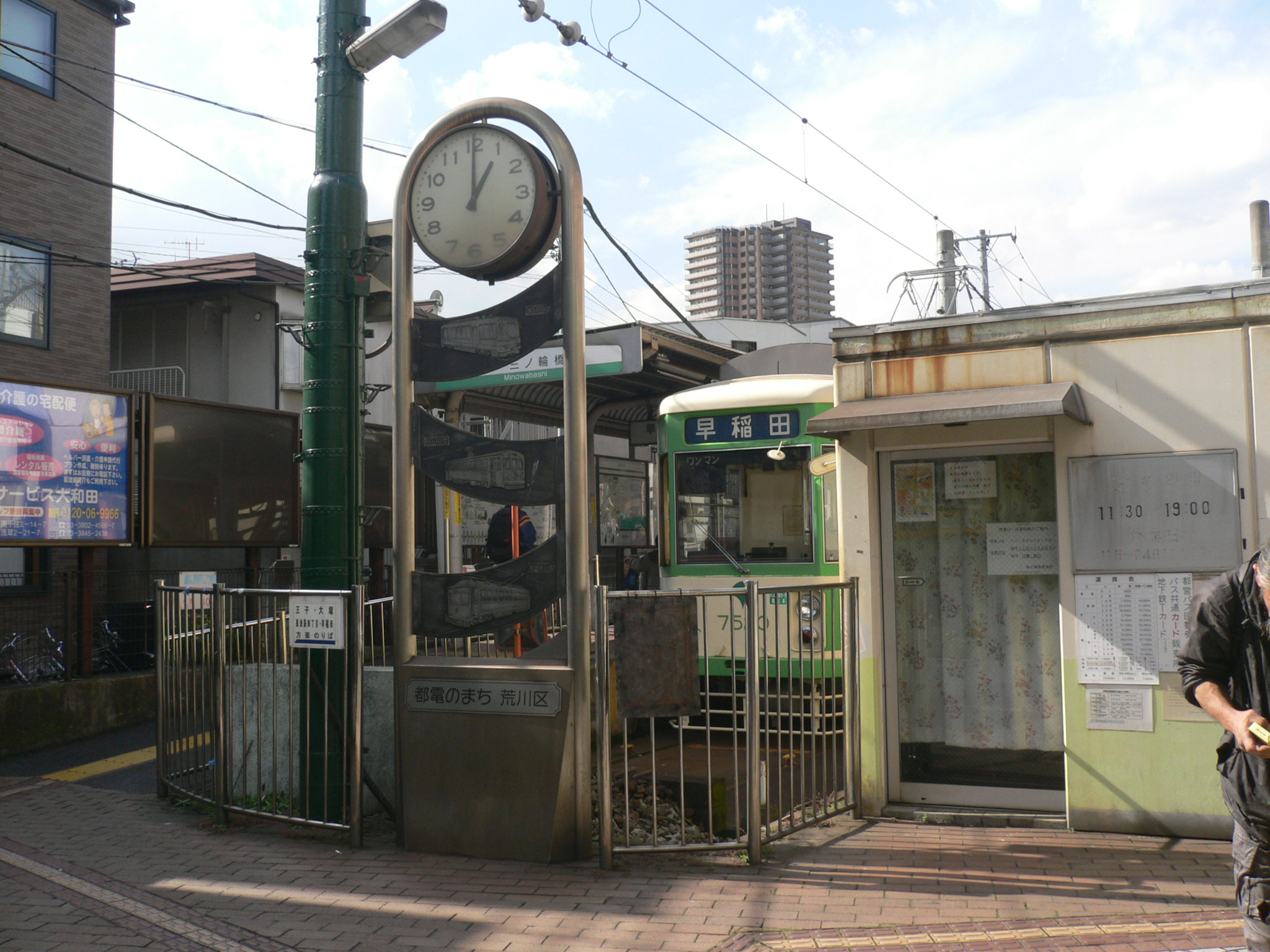
Minowabashi Station

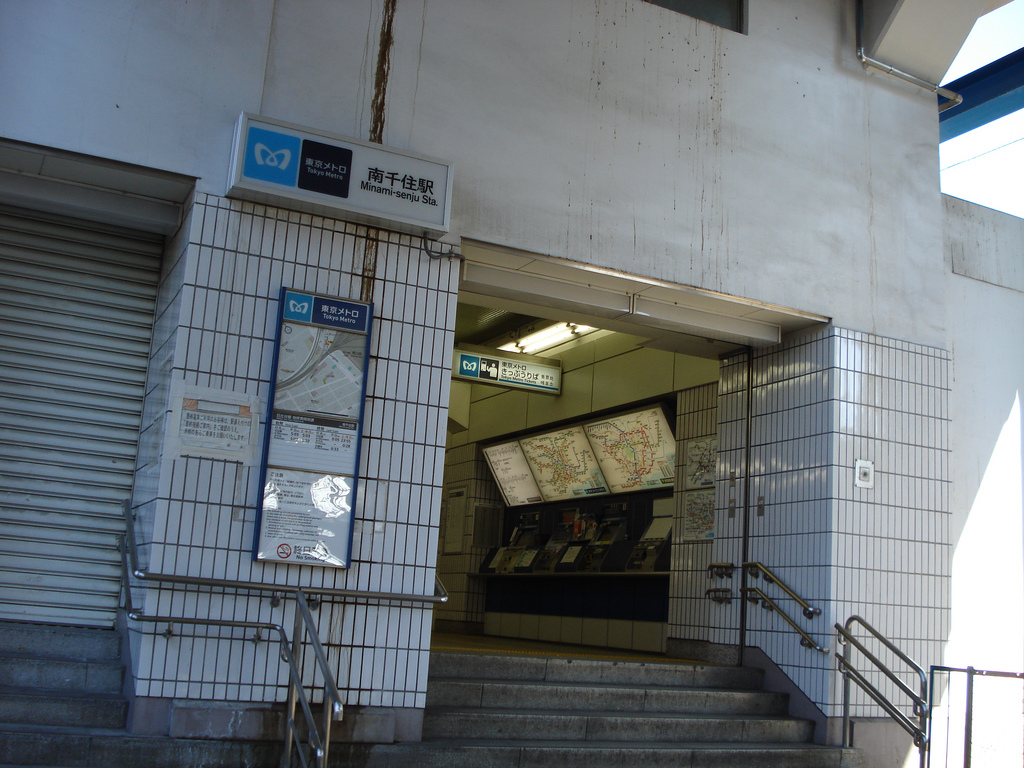
Minami-Senju Station

=== Rail ===
- JR East
  - Yamanote Line, Keihin Tohoku Line: Nishi Nippori, Nippori Stations
  - Joban Line: Nippori, Mikawashima, Minami-Senju Stations
- Tokyo Metropolitan Bureau of Transportation
  - Tokyo Sakura Tram (13 stations, including Minowabashi Station)
  - Nippori-Toneri Liner: Nippori, Nishi-Nippori, Akado-Shōgakkō-mae, Kumano-mae
- Tokyo Metro
  - Chiyoda Line: Nishi Nippori, Machiya Stations
  - Hibiya Line: Minami Senju Station
- Keisei Electric Railway Keisei Main Line: Nippori, Shin-Mikawashima, Machiya Stations
- Metropolitan Intercity Railway Company Tsukuba Express: Minami-Senju Station

Additional facilities are under construction.

=== Major roads ===
- Route 4 (the Nikkō Kaidō)
- Meiji Street
- Ogubashi Street
- Otakebashi Street
