= Toei 8800 series =

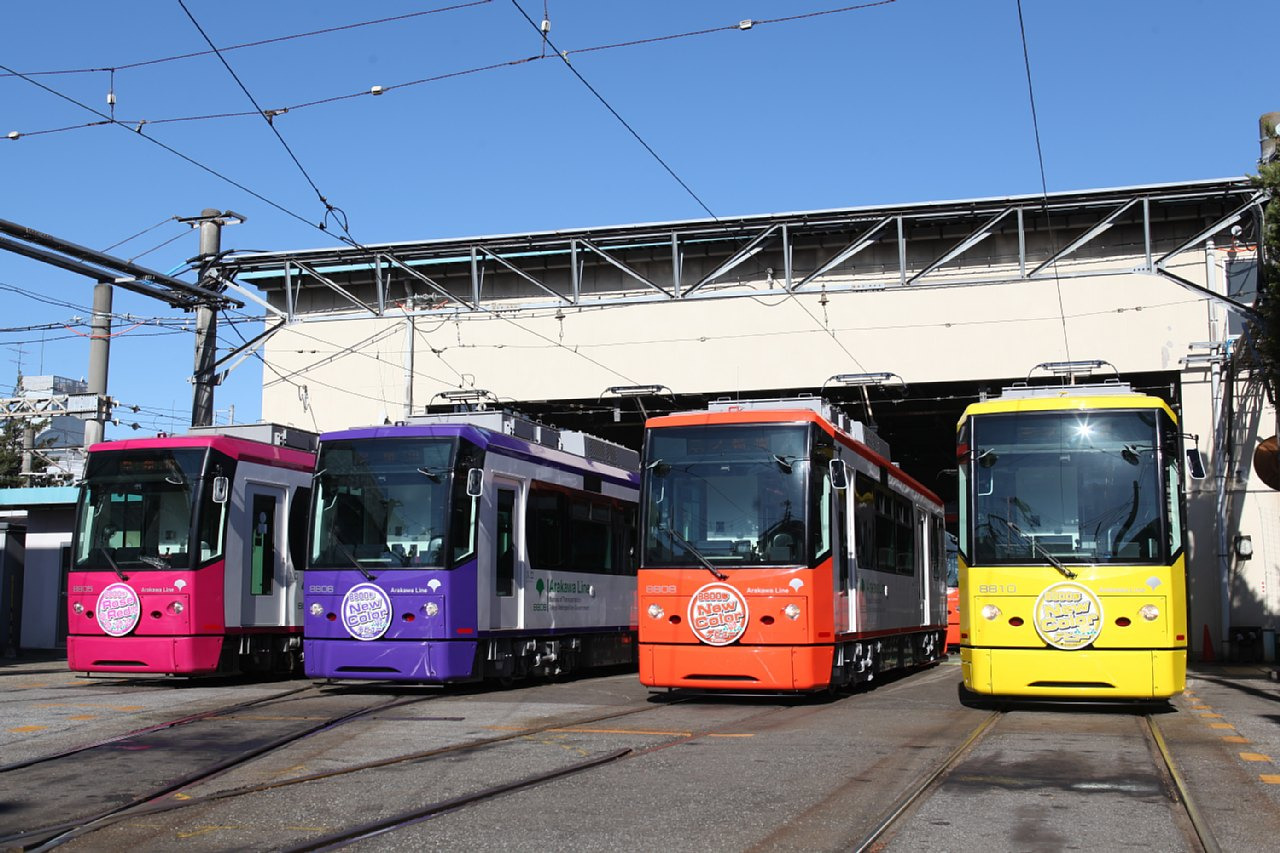
- Four 8800 series cars in December 2010
- In service: April 2009 –
- Manufacturer: Alna Sharyo
- Replaced: Toei 7500 series
- Constructed: 2009–2010
- Number built: 10 vehicles
- Number in service: 10 vehicles
- Formation: Single car
- Fleet numbers: 8801–8810
- Operator: Tokyo Metropolitan Bureau of Transportation
- Depot: Arakawa
- Line served: Toden Arakawa Line

Specifications
- Car body construction: Steel
- Car length: 13 m (42 ft 8 in)
- Width: 2.2 m (7 ft 3 in)
- Height: 3.8 m (12 ft 6 in)
- Floor height: 786 mm (2 ft 6.9 in)
- Doors: 2 per side
- Maximum speed: 40 km/h (25 mph)
- Electric system: 600 V DC Overhead wire
- Current collection: Pantograph
- Track gauge: 1,372 mm (4 ft 6 in)

The Toei 8800 series (東京都交通局8800形) is a tramcar type operated by Tokyo Metropolitan Bureau of Transportation (Toei) on the Toden Arakawa Line in Tokyo, Japan, since April 2009.

== Operations ==
The fleet of ten cars is based at Arakawa Depot, and operates on the sole remaining tram line in Tokyo, the Toden Arakawa Line.

== Liveries ==
The tramcars are finished in a white livery with coloured ends and a roofline stripe. The colours used on individual cars are as follows.

Car No.	Colour
8801	Rose red
8802	Rose red
8803	Rose red
8804	Rose red
8805	Rose red
8806	Violet
8807	Violet
8808	Orange
8809	Orange
8810	Yellow

Examples of toei 8800 series

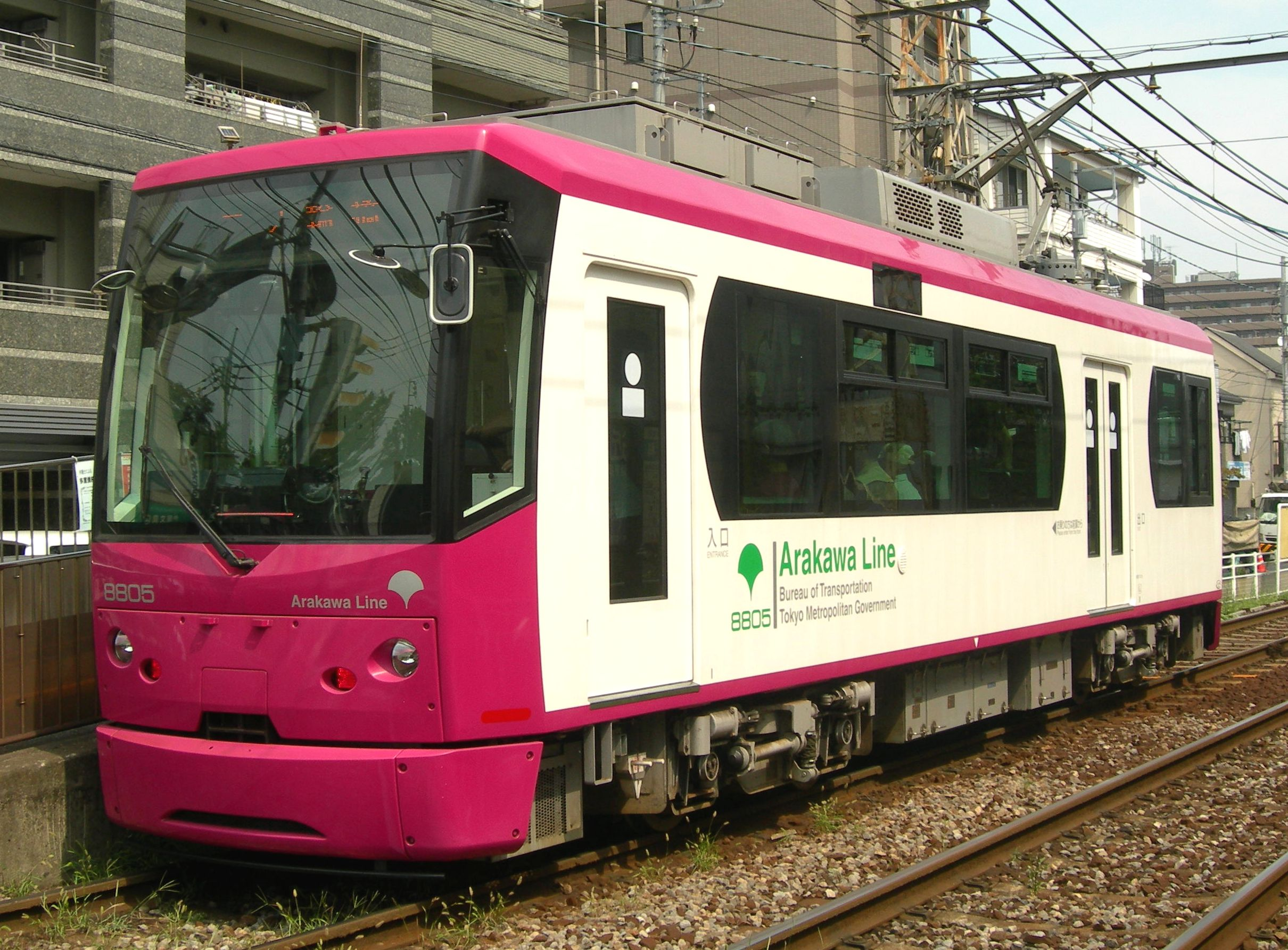
8805 in "rose red" livery

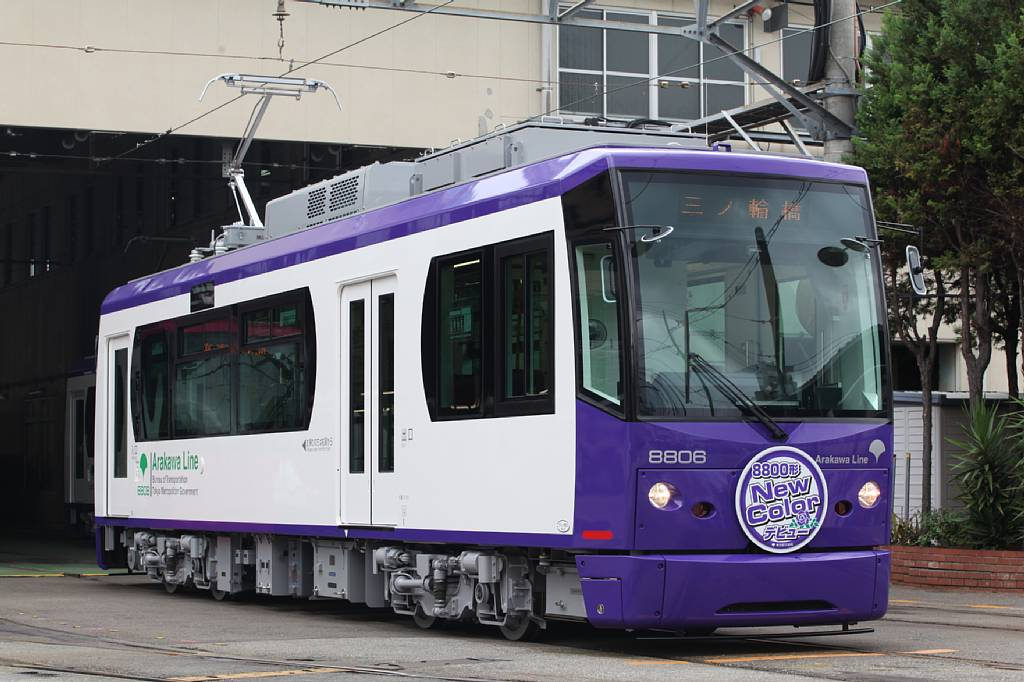
8806 in violet livery

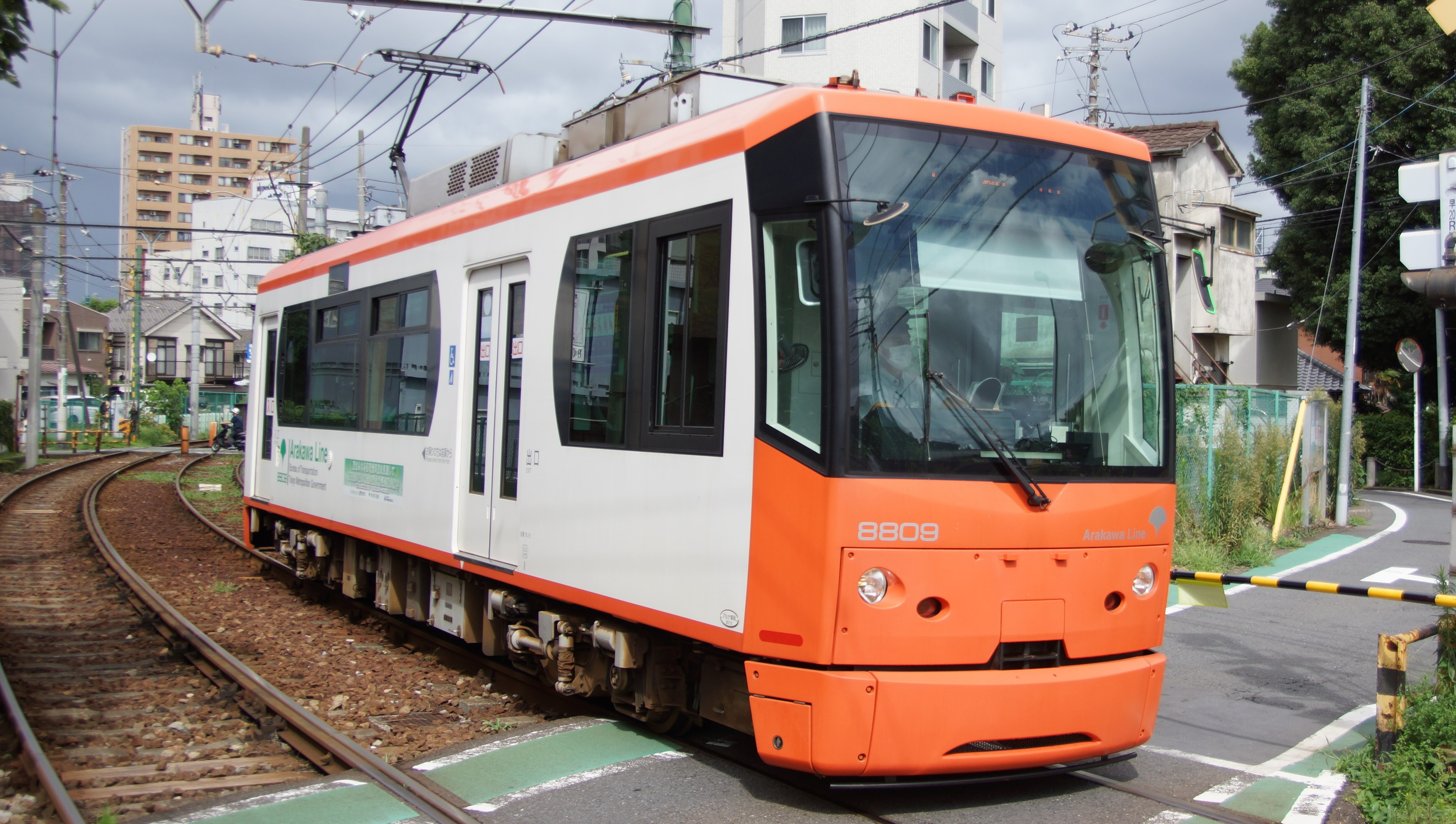
8809 in orange livery in August 2016

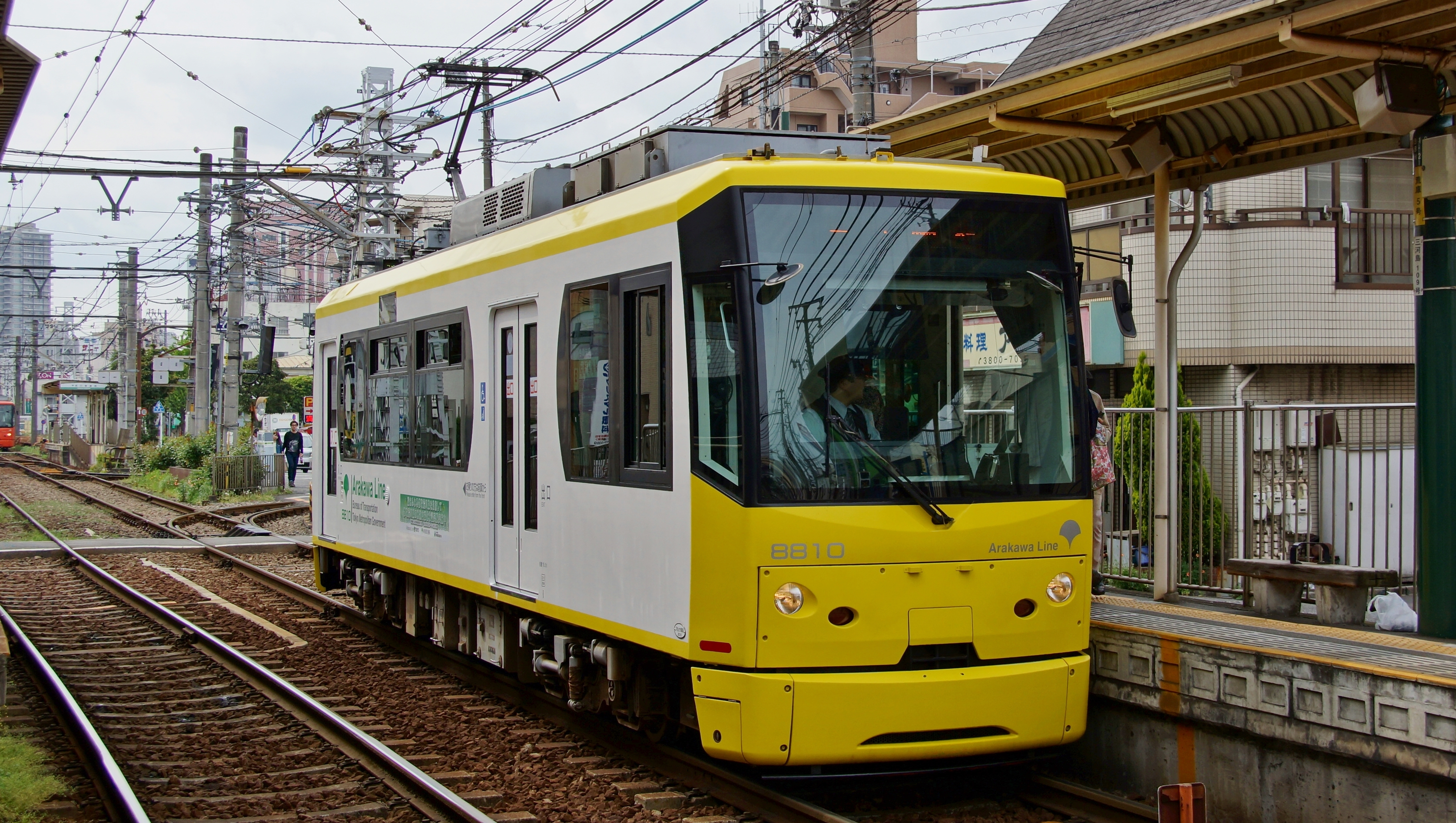
8810 in yellow livery in April 2016

== History ==
The first two cars, 8801 and 8802, entered revenue service on 26 April 2009. The last car built, yellow-liveried 8810, was delivered in December 2010.

== Fleet build details ==
The individual car build histories are as follows.

Car No.	Manufacturer	Date manufactured
8801	Alna Sharyo	6 March 2009
8802	Alna Sharyo	9 March 2009
8803	Alna Sharyo	19 February 2010
8804	Alna Sharyo	18 February 2010
8805	Alna Sharyo	16 February 2010
8806	Alna Sharyo	13 October 2010
8807	Alna Sharyo	12 October 2010
8808	Alna Sharyo	17 December 2010
8809	Alna Sharyo	16 December 2010
8810	Alna Sharyo	15 December 2010
