= Ōji Station =

Ōji Station is the name of two train stations in Japan:

- Ōji Station (Nara) (王寺駅), in Oji, Kitakatsuragi District, Nara Prefecture
- Ōji Station (Tokyo) (王子駅), in Kita, Tokyo
