= Asukayama Station =

Tram station in Tokyo

Coordinates: 35.7503°N 139.7373°E

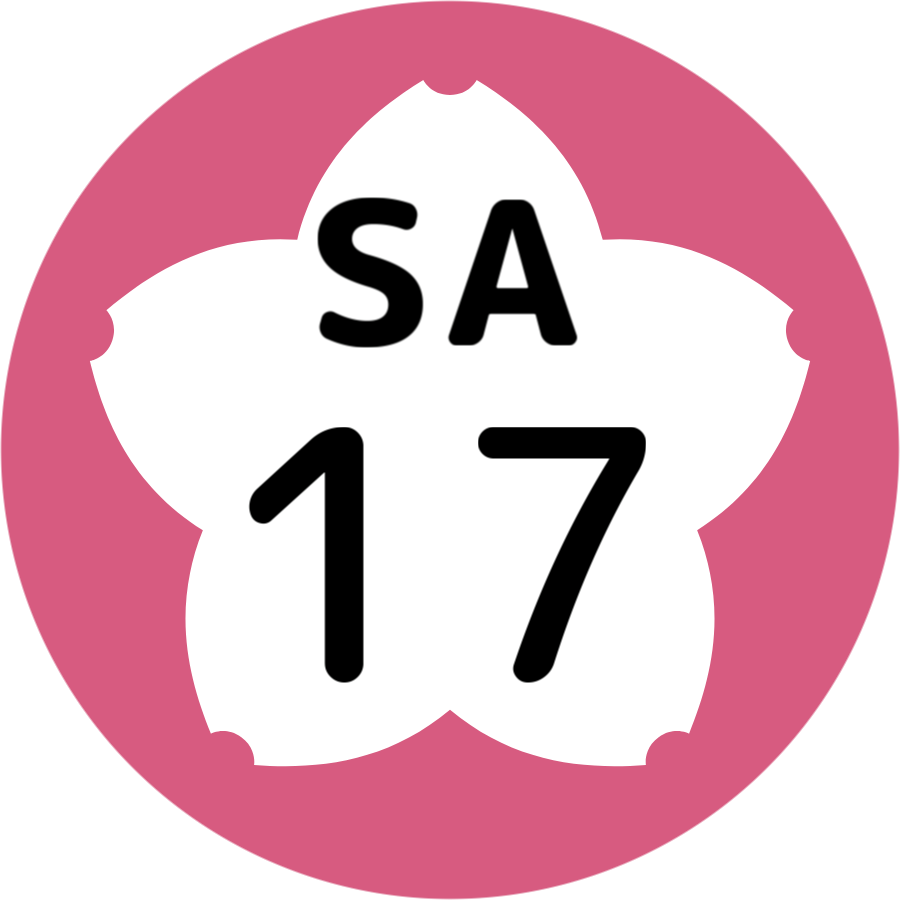
Asukayama Station 飛鳥山停留場

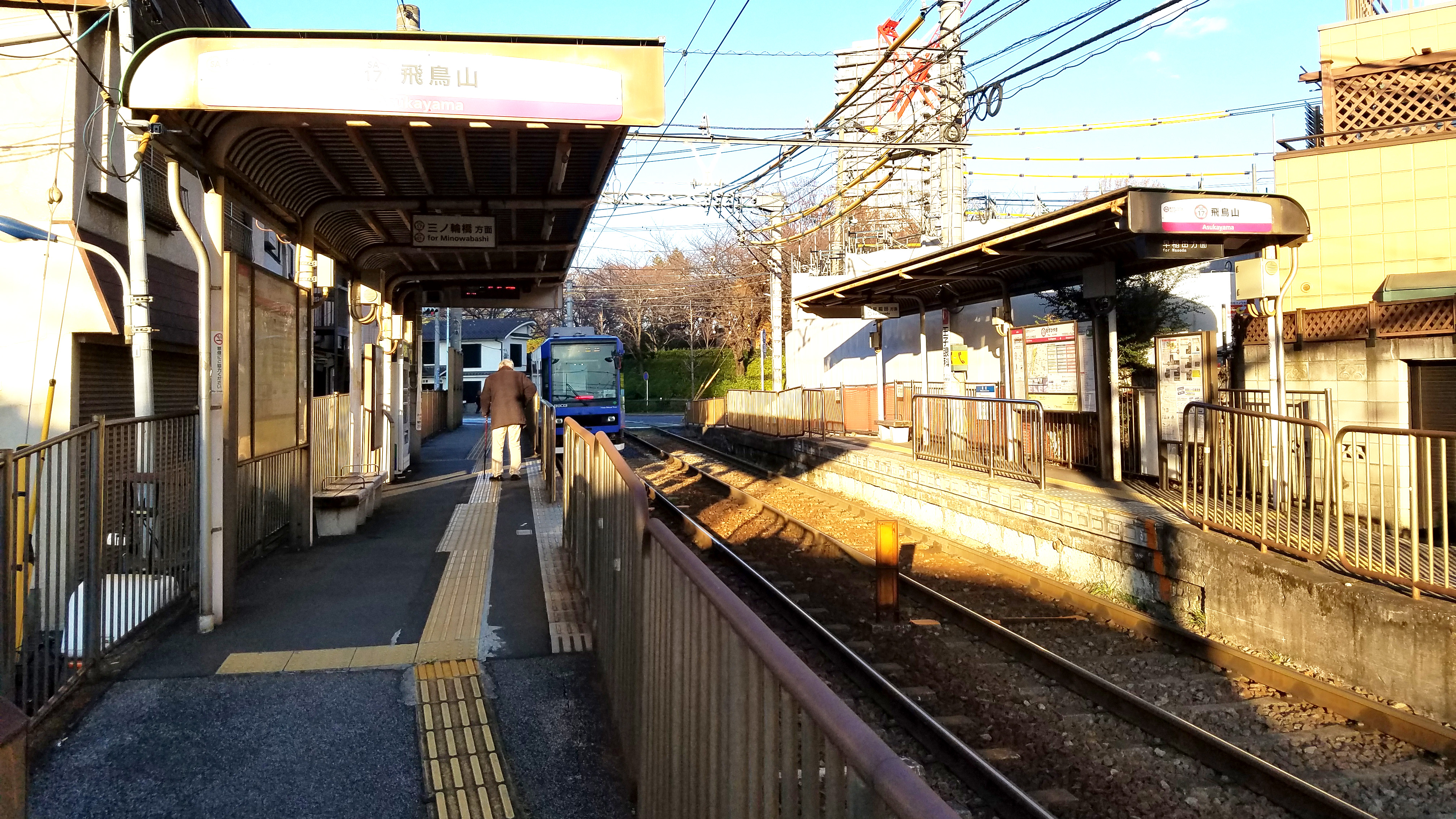
- Station platforms in December 2018

General information
- Location: Tokyo Sakura Tram; Japan
- Operator: Toei
- Line: Toden Arakawa Line
- Platforms: 2 side platforms
- Tracks: 2

Construction
- Structure type: At grade

Other information
- Station code: SA17

History
- Opened: August 20, 1911

Services
Preceding station	Toei	Following station
Takinogawa-itchōme towards Waseda	Toden Arakawa Line	Ōji-ekimae towards Minowabashi
Location
- Location within Special wards of Tokyo Location within Tokyo Bay and Bōsō Peninsula Location within Tokyo Location within Japan

Asukayama Station (飛鳥山停留場, Asukayama teiryūjō) is a station in the Tokyo Sakura Tram. It is located in Kita, Tokyo. The section between here and Oji-ekimae Station is shared with other vehicles with it being on Meiji-dōri Street.

== Lines ==
Asukayama Station is served by the Tokyo Sakura Tram.

== Surroundings ==
- Asukayama Park
