= Takinogawa-itchōme Station =

Tram station in Tokyo, Japan

Coordinates: 35.7474°N 139.7350°E

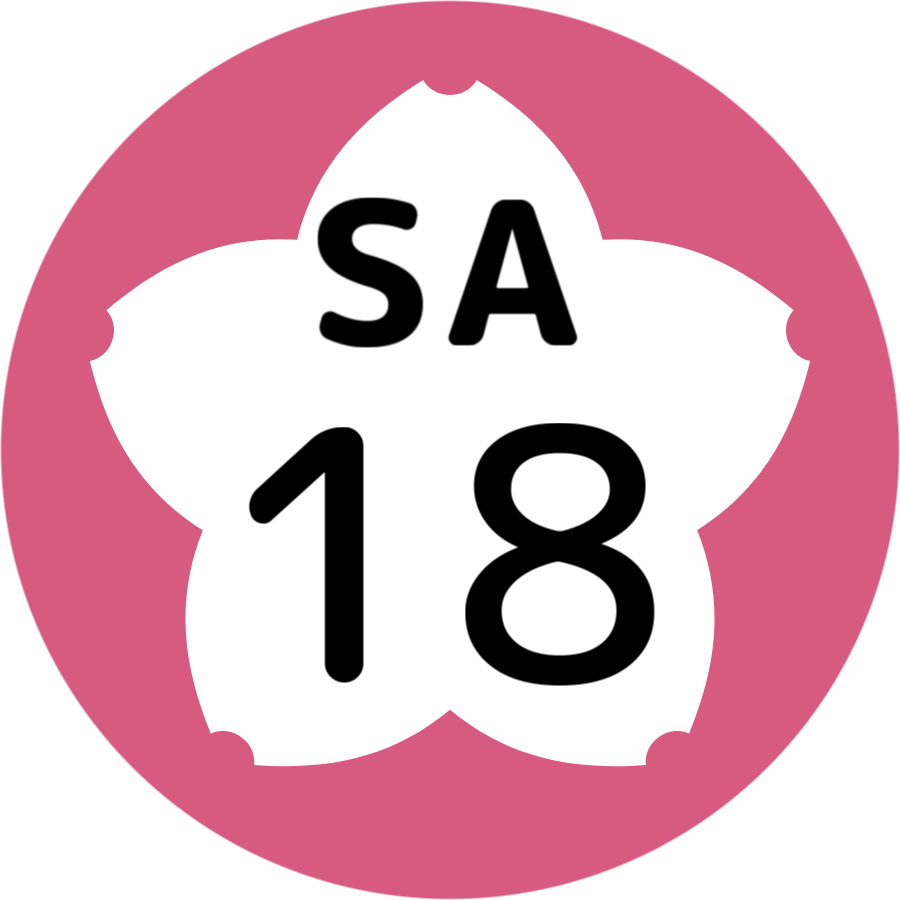
Takinogawa-itchome Station 滝野川一丁目停留場

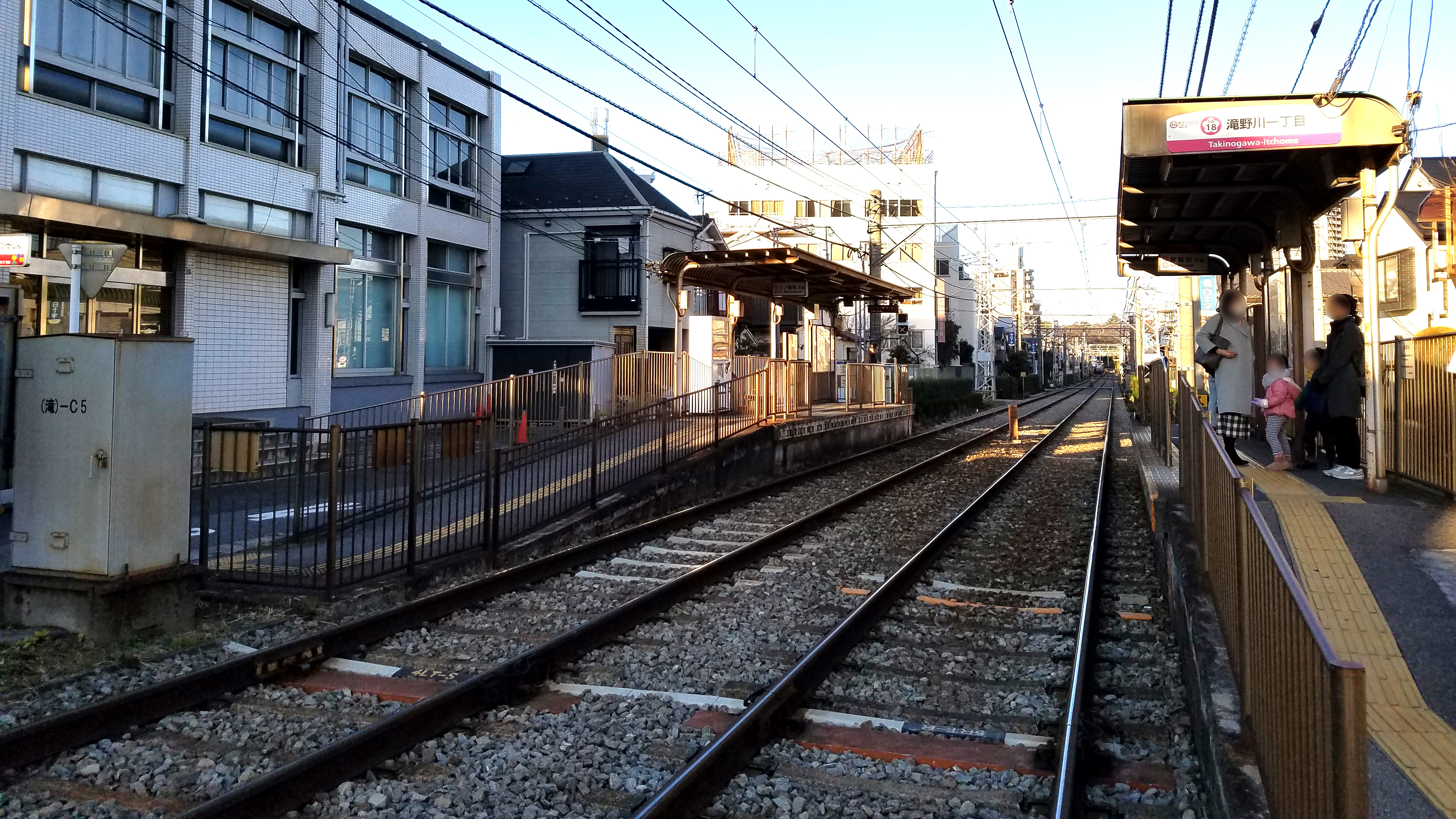
- Station platforms in December 2018

General information
- Location: Takinogawa 1-chome, Kita Ward, Tokyo; Japan
- Operator: Toei
- Line: Toden Arakawa Line
- Platforms: 2 side platforms
- Tracks: 2

Construction
- Structure type: At grade

Other information
- Station code: SA18

History
- Opened: 20 August 1911; 115 years ago

Services
Preceding station	Toei	Following station
Nishigahara-yonchōme towards Waseda	Toden Arakawa Line	Asukayama towards Minowabashi
Location
- Location within Special wards of Tokyo Location within Tokyo Bay and Bōsō Peninsula Location within Tokyo Location within Japan

Takinogawa-itchome Station (滝野川一丁目停留場, Takinogawa-itchōme-teiryūjō) is a tram station operated by Tokyo Metropolitan Bureau of Transportation's Tokyo Sakura Tram located in Kita, Tokyo, Japan. It is 6.9 kilometres from the terminus of the Tokyo Sakura Tram at Minowabashi Station.

== Layout ==
Takinogawa-itchome Station has two opposed side platforms.

== Surrounding area ==
- National Route 122
- Inner Circular Route

== History ==
- August 20, 1911: Station opened
