= Toei 8500 series =

Tramcar type operated in Tokyo, Japan

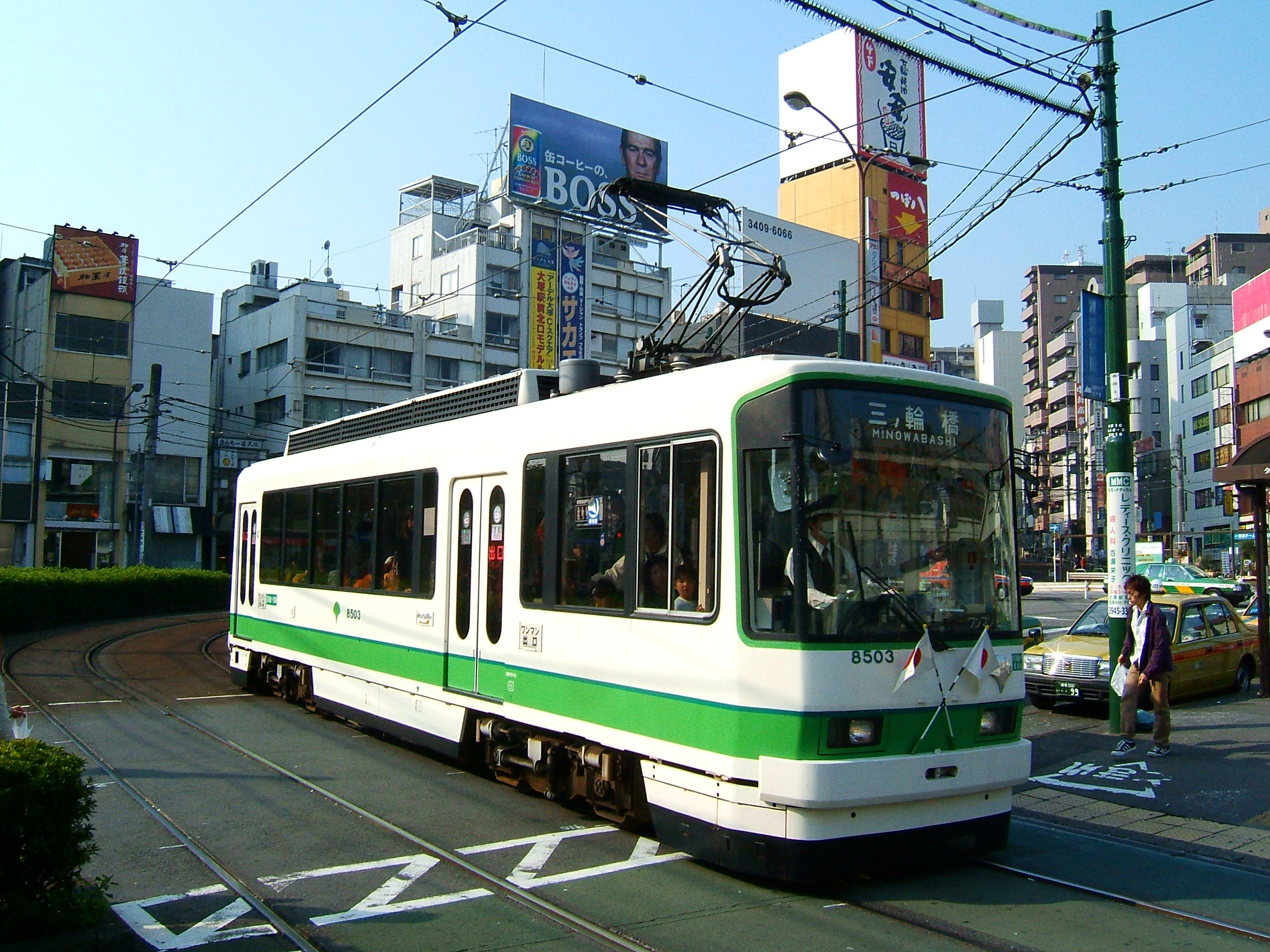
- 8500 series number 8503 in November 2006
- In service: 1990–
- Manufacturer: Alna Koki
- Constructed: 1990–1993
- Number in service: 5 vehicles (as of 1 April 2015)
- Formation: Single car
- Fleet numbers: 8501–8505
- Operator: Tokyo Metropolitan Bureau of Transportation
- Depot: Arakawa
- Line served: Toden Arakawa Line

Specifications
- Car body construction: Steel
- Doors: 2 sliding doors per side
- Electric system: 600 V DC Overhead wire
- Current collection: Pantograph
- Track gauge: 1,372 mm (4 ft 6 in)

The Toei 8500 series (東京都交通局8500形) is a tramcar type operated by Tokyo Metropolitan Bureau of Transportation (Toei) on the Toden Arakawa Line in Tokyo, Japan, since 1990.

== Operations ==
The fleet is based at Arakawa Depot, and operates on the sole remaining tram line in Tokyo, the Toden Arakawa Line.

== History ==
The five cars in the fleet were built between 1990 and 1993 by Alna Sharyo. The individual car build histories are as follows.

Car No.	Manufacturer	Build date
8501	Alna Sharyo	16 April 1990
8502	Alna Sharyo	23 April 1992
8503	Alna Sharyo	23 April 1992
8504	Alna Sharyo	6 April 1993
8505	Alna Sharyo	6 April 1993
