= Ōji Station (Tokyo) =

Railway, metro, and tram station in Tokyo, Japan

Coordinates: 35°45′09″N 139°44′17″E

Ōji Station Oji-ekimae Station 王子駅 王子駅前停留場
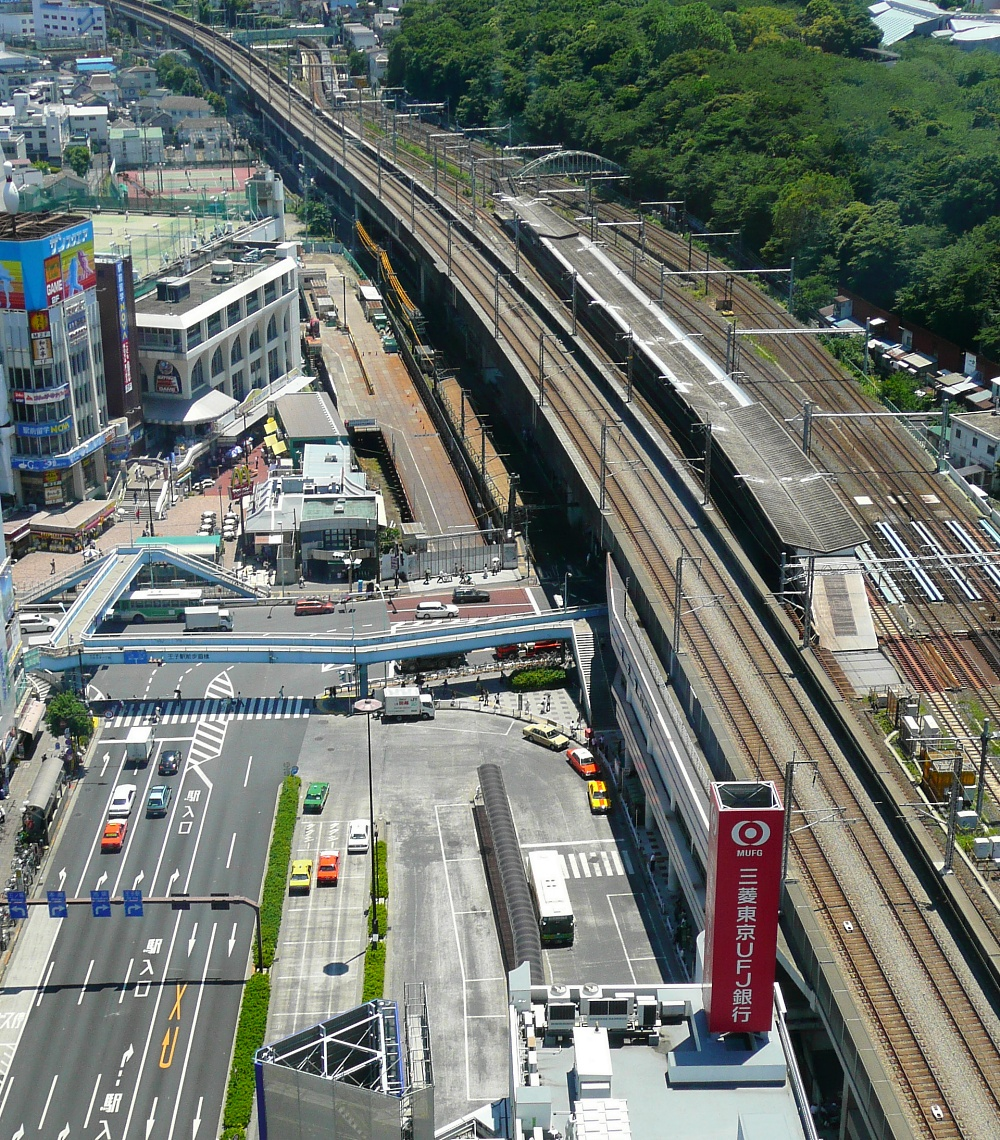
- Ōji Station from Hokutopia

General information
- Location: Kita-ku, Tokyo; Japan
- Operator: JR East; Tokyo Metro; Toei
- Lines: Keihin-Tōhoku Line (Tōhoku Main Line); Namboku Line; Toden Arakawa Line

History
- Opened: 1883
Location

Ōji Station (王子駅, Ōji-eki) is a railway station on the Keihin-Tōhoku Line and the Tokyo Metro Namboku Line, located in the Ōji area of Kita, Tokyo. It is also a tram stop on the Tokyo Sakura Tram named Oji-ekimae Station (王子駅前停留場, Ōji-ekimae Teiryūjō).

== Lines ==
- JR East - Ōji Station
  - Tōhoku Main Line (Keihin-Tōhoku Line)
- Tokyo Metro - Oji Station
  - Namboku Line
- Toei - Oji-ekimae Station
  - Tokyo Sakura Tram

== JR East ==
JK36 Ōji Station 王子駅
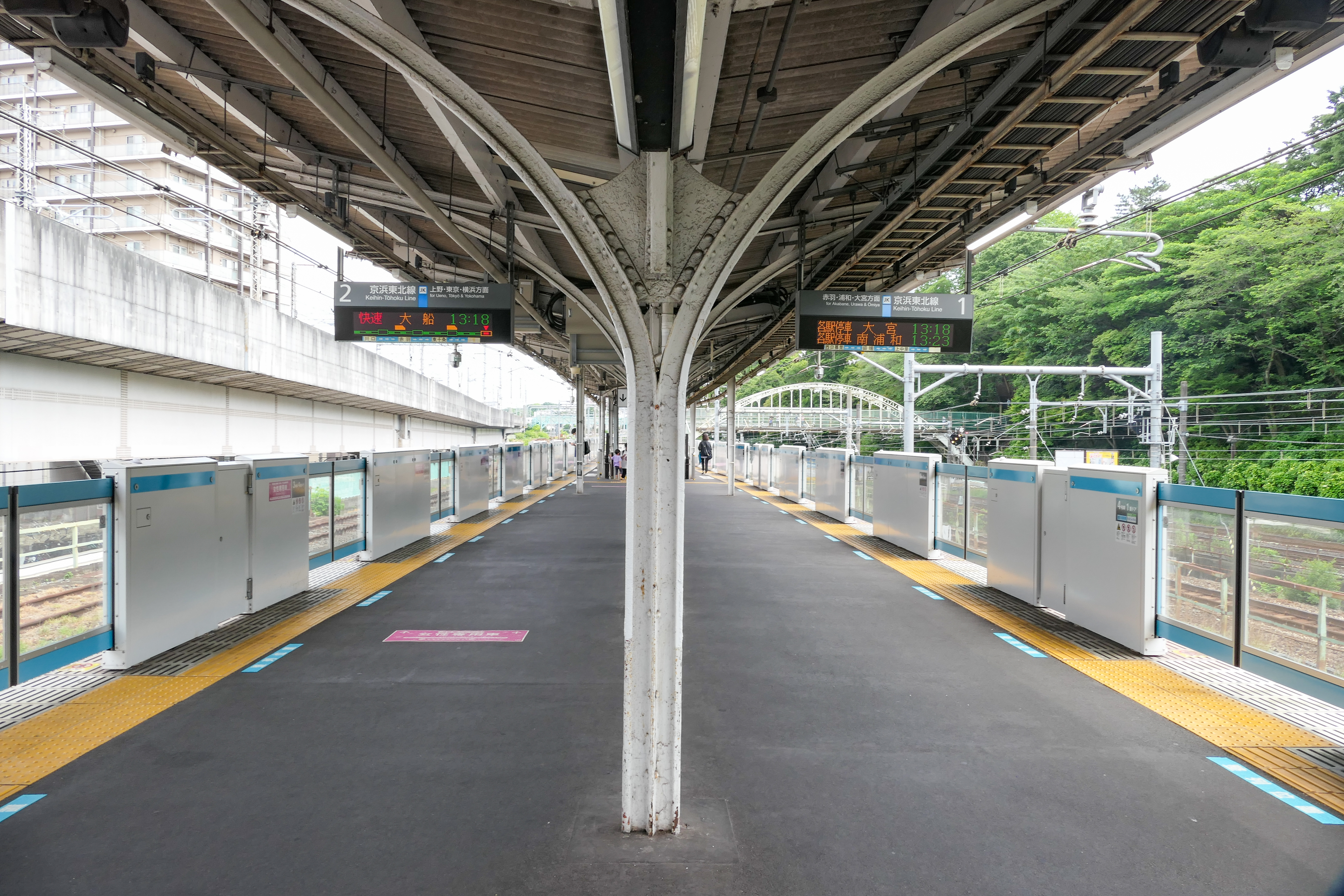
- JR station platform in May 2023

General information
- Location: 1-3 Ōji, Kita-ku, Tokyo; Japan
- Operator: JR East
- Line: Keihin-Tōhoku Line

Other information
- Station code: JK36

History
- Opened: 28 July 1883; 143 years ago

Services
Preceding station	JR East	Following station
Kami-Nakazato JK35 towards Yokohama	Keihin–Tōhoku Line Rapid Local	Higashi-Jūjō JK37 towards Ōmiya
Location

The Keihin-Tōhoku Line station consists of a single island platform serving two tracks.

=== Platforms ===
1	Keihin-Tōhoku Line	for Akabane, Minami-Urawa, and Ōmiya
2	Keihin-Tōhoku Line	for Ueno, Tokyo, Yokohama and Ōfuna

== Tokyo Metro ==
Oji Station 王子駅

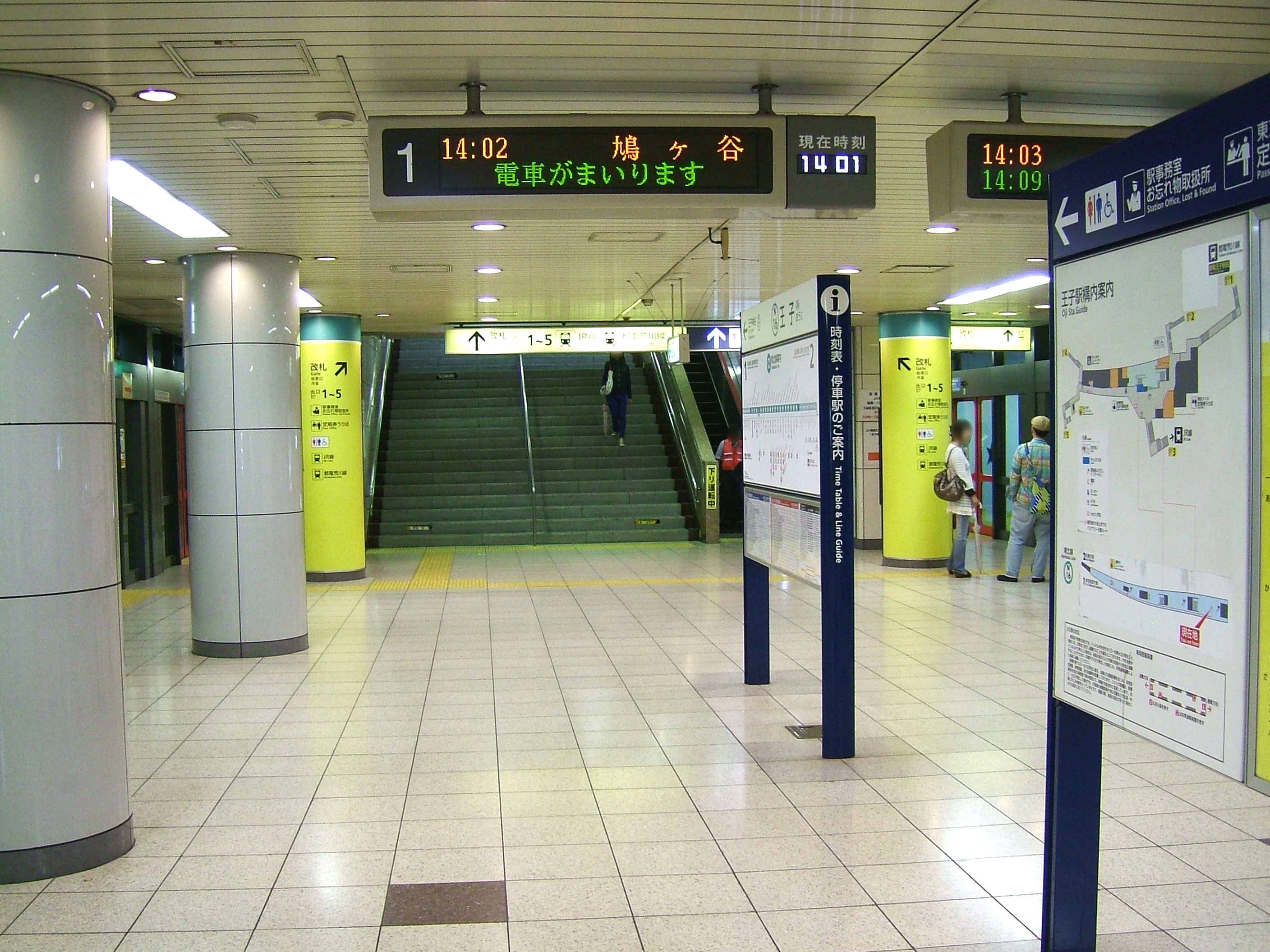
- Tokyo Metro station platform in June 2008

General information
- Location: 1-10-18 Ōji, Kita-ku, Tokyo; Japan
- Operator: Tokyo Metro
- Line: Namboku Line
- Distance: 17.4 km (10.8 mi) from Meguro
- Platforms: 1 island platform
- Tracks: 2

Construction
- Structure type: Underground

Other information
- Station code: N-16
- Website: www.tokyometro.jp/lang_en/station/oji/index.html

History
- Opened: 29 November 1991; 34 years ago

Services
Preceding station	Tokyo Metro	Following station
Nishigahara towards Meguro	Namboku Line	Oji-kamiya towards Akabane-iwabuchi
Location

The Namboku Line station consists of a single island platform serving two tracks.

=== Platforms ===
1
Namboku Line
for Akabane-iwabuchi
Saitama Rapid Railway Line for Urawa-misono
2
- for Shirokane-takanawa and Meguro
- Meguro Line for Hiyoshi
- Tokyu Shin-Yokohama Line for Shin-Yokohama Station
- Sotetsu Main Line for Ebina via the Tokyu/Sotetsu Shin-Yokohama Line

== Toei ==
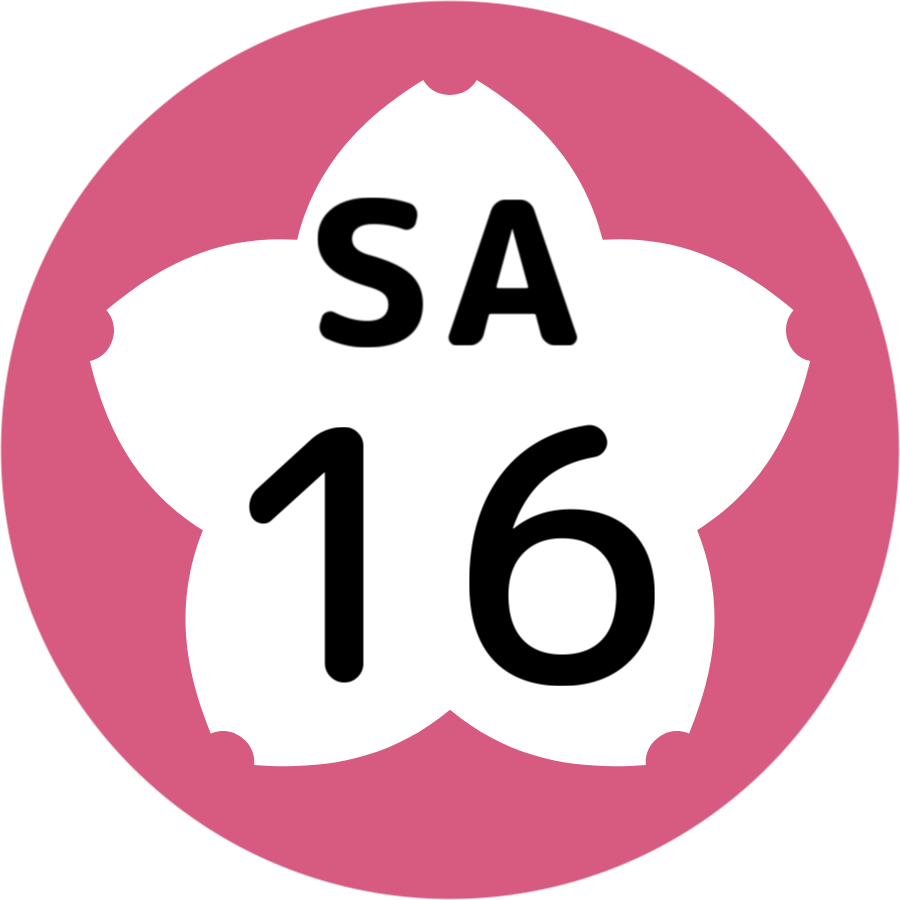
Oji-ekimae Station 王子駅前停留場

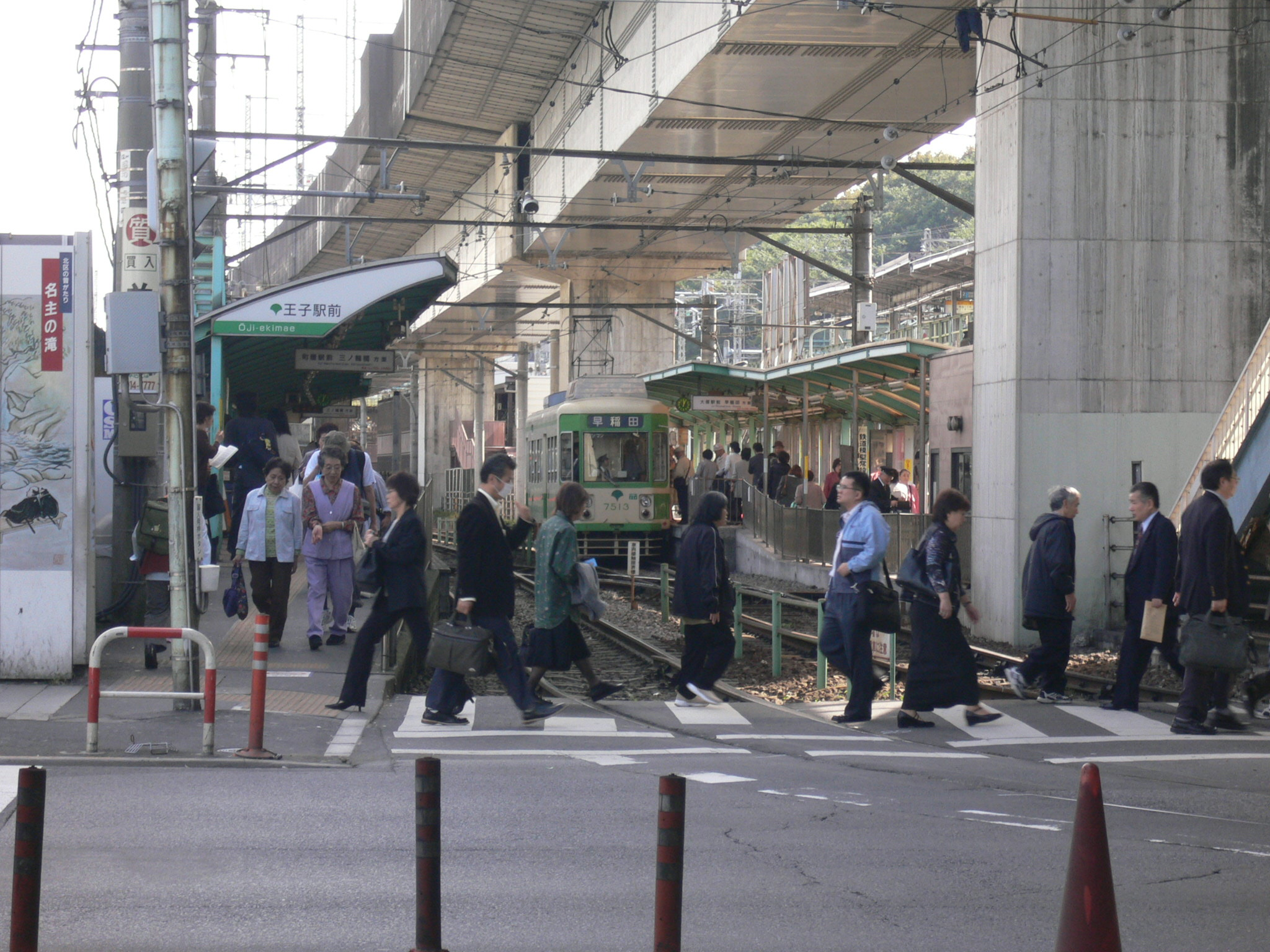
- Tokyo Sakura Tram station in October 2005

General information
- Location: 1 Ōji, Kita Ward, Tokyo; Japan
- Operator: Toei
- Line: Toden Arakawa Line
- Distance: 6.0 km (3.7 mi) from Minowabashi
- Platforms: 2 side platforms
- Tracks: 2

Construction
- Structure type: At grade

Other information
- Website: www.kotsu.metro.tokyo.jp/eng/services/streetcar/stations/oji-ekimae.html

History
- Opened: 17 April 1915; 111 years ago

Services
Preceding station	Toei	Following station
Asukayama towards Waseda	Toden Arakawa Line	Sakaechō towards Minowabashi
Location

The Tokyo Sakura Tram station consists of two side platforms serving two tracks.

== History ==
The station opened on 28 July 1883.

What is now the Toden Arakawa Line begins operation on 17 April 1915.

The Namboku Line subway station opened on 29 November 1991. It was inherited by Tokyo Metro after the privatization of the Teito Rapid Transit Authority (TRTA) in 2004.
