= Toei 9000 series =

Tramcar type operated in Tokyo, Japan

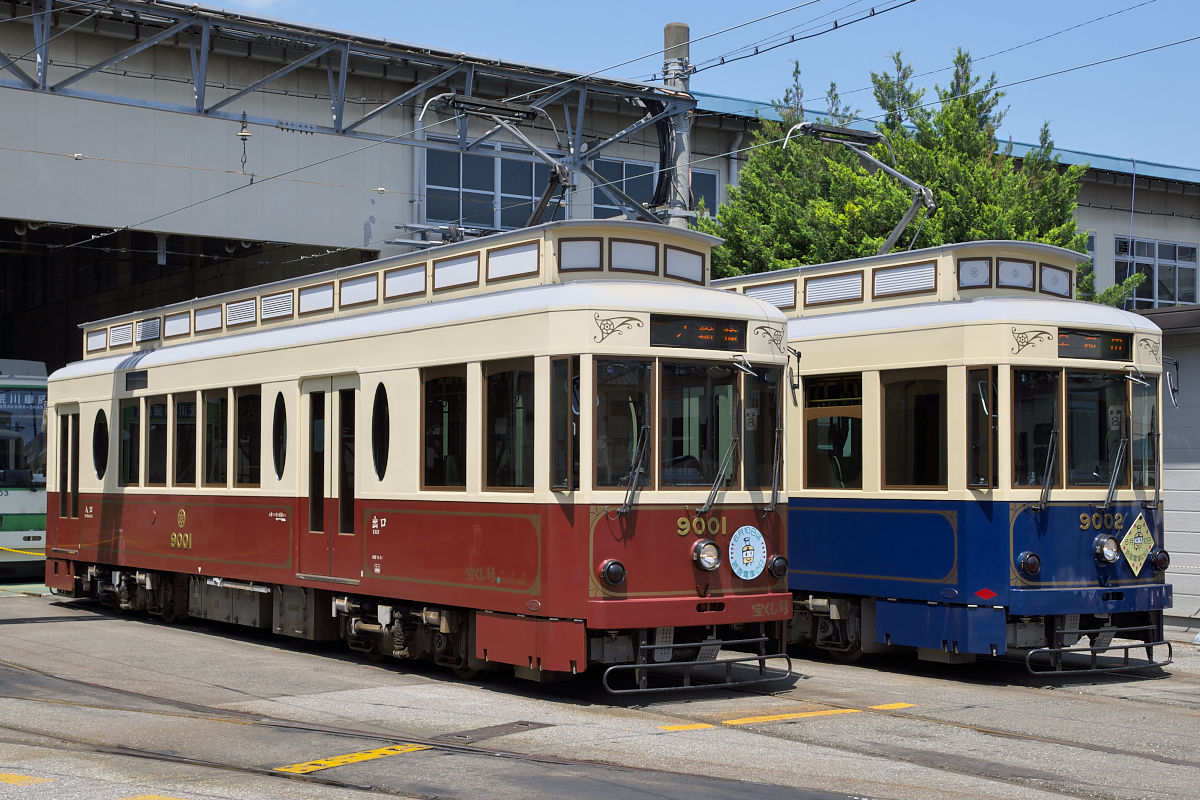
- The two 9000 series cars, 9001 and 9002, in June 2009
- In service: May 2007–
- Manufacturer: Alna Sharyo
- Constructed: 2007–2009
- Number in service: 2 vehicles (as of 1 April 2015)
- Formation: Single car
- Fleet numbers: 9001–9002
- Capacity: 64
- Operator: Tokyo Metropolitan Bureau of Transportation
- Depot: Arakawa
- Line served: Toden Arakawa Line

Specifications
- Car body construction: Steel
- Car length: 13 m (42 ft 8 in)
- Width: 2.21 m (7 ft 3 in)
- Height: 3.8 m (12 ft 6 in)
- Floor height: 500 mm (1 ft 8 in)
- Doors: 2 sliding doors per side
- Maximum speed: 40 km/h (25 mph)
- Weight: 18.5 t (18.2 long tons; 20.4 short tons)
- Acceleration: 3.0 km/(h⋅s) (1.9 mph/s)
- Deceleration: 4.5 km/(h⋅s) (2.8 mph/s)
- Electric system: 600 V DC Overhead wire
- Current collection: Pantograph
- Track gauge: 1,372 mm (4 ft 6 in)

The Toei 9000 series (東京都交通局9000形) is a type of tramcar operated by the Tokyo Metropolitan Bureau of Transportation (Toei) on the Toden Arakawa Line in Tokyo, Japan, since 2007.

== Design ==
The two 9000 series cars have a retro-style exterior and interior. Car 9001 is finished in a maroon and cream livery, while car 9002 features a blue and cream livery.

== Operations ==
The fleet of two cars is based at Arakawa Depot and operates on the Toden Arakawa Line, which is the last remaining tram line in Tokyo

== History ==
The 9000 series cars were built by Alna Sharyo between 2007 and 2009, with the first car entering service in May 2007.

== Fleet details ==
The individual car build histories are as follows.

Car No.	Manufacturer	Build date	Livery
9001	Alna Sharyo	29 March 2007	Maroon & cream
9002	Alna Sharyo	29 January 2009	Blue & cream
