= Toden Arakawa Line =

Hybrid light rail/tram line in Tokyo, Japan

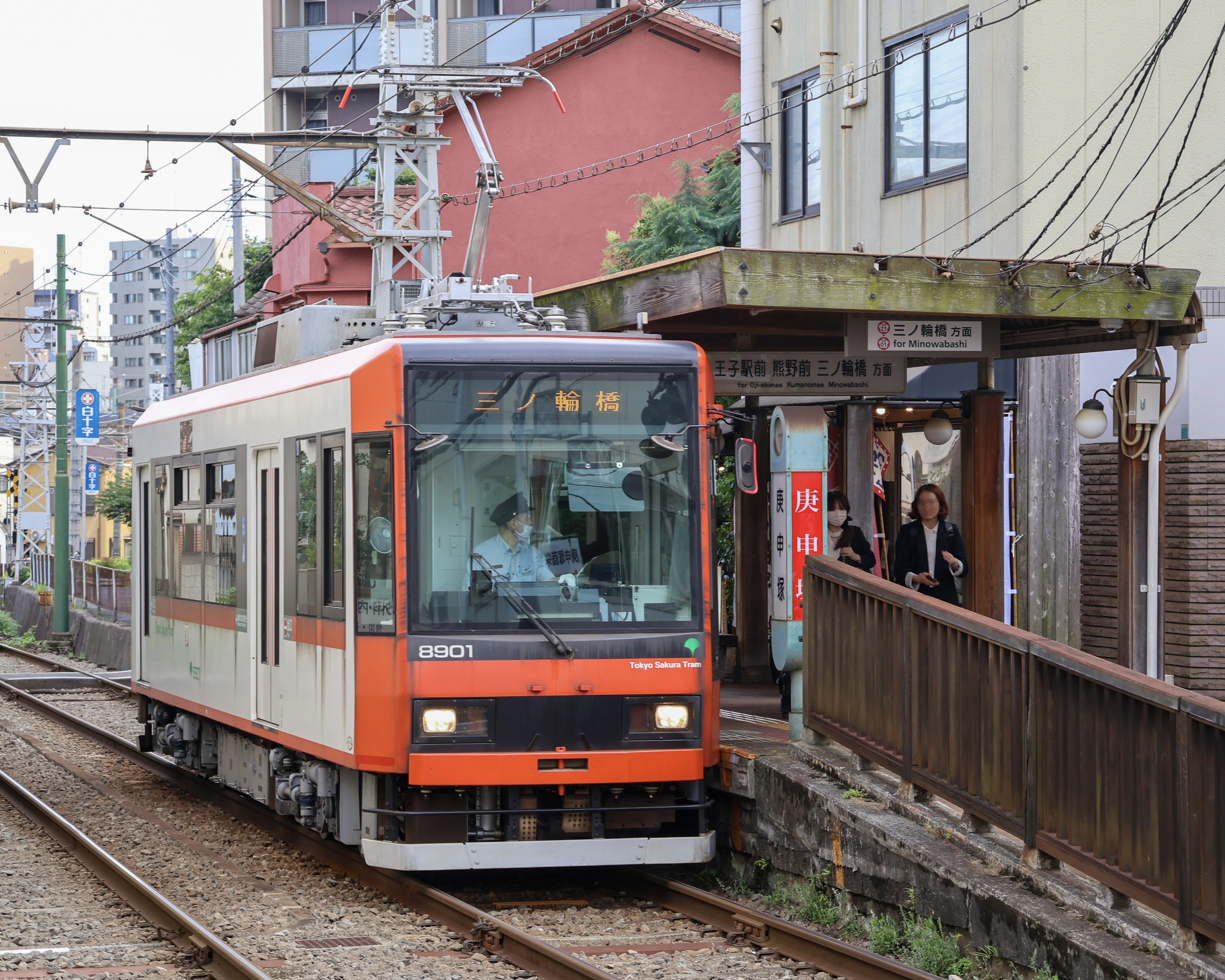
- A Toei 8900 series tram at Kōshinzuka in June 2026

Overview
- Other name: Tokyo Sakura Tram
- Native name: 都電荒川線
- Owner: Tokyo Metropolitan Bureau of Transportation (Toei)
- Locale: Tokyo
- Termini: Waseda; Minowabashi
- Stations: 30

Service
- Type: Tram / light rail

History
- Opened: 1911; 115 years ago (Ōji Electric Tram Company, Otsuka-ekimae – Asukayama); 1974; 52 years ago (Arakawa Line)

Technical
- Line length: 12.2 km (7.6 mi)
- Track gauge: 1,372 mm (4 ft 6 in)
- Electrification: Overhead line, 600 V DC

The Toden Arakawa Line, (Note: Japanese: 都電荒川線, Hepburn: Toden Arakawa-sen) branded as the Tokyo Sakura Tram, (Note: 東京さくらトラム, Tōkyō Sakura Toramu) is a hybrid tram/light rail line in Tokyo, Japan, operated by the Tokyo Metropolitan Bureau of Transportation (Toei). The line is the sole survivor of Tokyo's once-extensive Tokyo Toden tram system and one of the only two light rail lines in Tokyo, besides the Setagaya Line.

== Station list ==
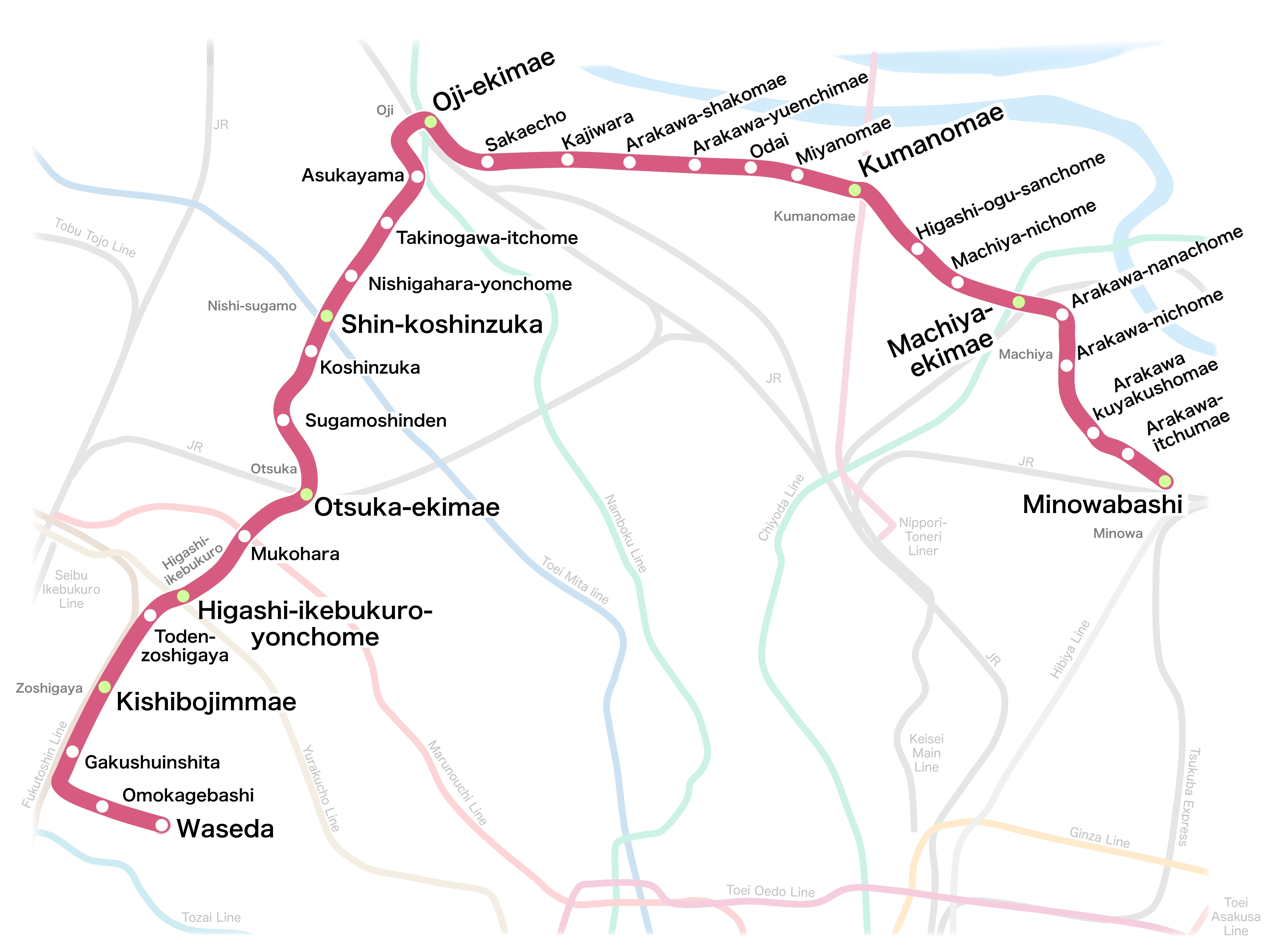
Map

All stations are located in Tokyo.

No.	Station	Distance in km (mi)		Transfers	Location
No.	Station	Between stations	Total	Transfers	Location
SA01	Minowabashi 三ノ輪橋	—N/a	0 (0)	Hibiya Line (Minowa: H-20)	Arakawa
SA02	Arakawa-itchūmae 荒川一中前	0.3 (0.19)			Arakawa
SA03	Arakawa-kuyakushomae 荒川区役所前	0.3 (0.19)	0.6 (0.37)		Arakawa
SA04	Arakawa-nichōme 荒川二丁目	0.4 (0.25)	1.0 (0.62)		Arakawa
SA05	Arakawa-nanachōme 荒川七丁目	0.4 (0.25)	1.4 (0.87)		Arakawa
SA06	Machiya-ekimae 町屋駅前	0.4 (0.25)	1.8 (1.1)	Main Line (Machiya: KS04); Chiyoda Line (Machiya: C-17)	Arakawa
SA07	Machiya-nichōme 町屋二丁目	0.4 (0.25)	2.2 (1.4)		Arakawa
SA08	Higashi-ogu-sanchōme 東尾久三丁目	0.3 (0.19)	2.5 (1.6)		Arakawa
SA09	Kumanomae 熊野前	0.6 (0.37)	3.1 (1.9)	Nippori–Toneri Liner (NT04)	Arakawa
SA10	Miyanomae 宮ノ前	0.4 (0.25)	3.5 (2.2)		Arakawa
SA11	Odai 小台	0.3 (0.19)	3.8 (2.4)		Arakawa
SA12	Arakawa-yūenchimae 荒川遊園地前	0.3 (0.19)	4.1 (2.5)		Arakawa
SA13	Arakawa-shakomae 荒川車庫前	0.5 (0.31)	4.6 (2.9)		Arakawa
SA14	Kajiwara 梶原	0.4 (0.25)	5.0 (3.1)		Kita
SA15	Sakaechō 栄町	0.5 (0.31)	5.5 (3.4)		Kita
SA16	Ōji-ekimae 王子駅前	0.5 (0.31)	6.0 (3.7)	Keihin–Tōhoku Line (Ōji: JK36); Namboku Line (Oji: N-16)	Kita
SA17	Asukayama 飛鳥山	0.5 (0.31)	6.5 (4.0)		Kita
SA18	Takinogawa-itchōme 滝野川一丁目	0.4 (0.25)	6.9 (4.3)		Kita
SA19	Nishigahara-yonchōme 西ヶ原四丁目	0.4 (0.25)	7.3 (4.5)		Kita
SA20	Shin-kōshinzuka 新庚申塚	0.4 (0.25)	7.7 (4.8)	Mita Line (Nishi-sugamo: I-16)	Toshima
SA21	Kōshinzuka 庚申塚	0.2 (0.12)	7.9 (4.9)		Toshima
SA22	Sugamoshinden 巣鴨新田	0.5 (0.31)	8.4 (5.2)		Toshima
SA23	Ōtsuka-ekimae 大塚駅前	0.5 (0.31)	8.9 (5.5)	Yamanote Line (Ōtsuka: JY12)	Toshima
SA24	Mukōhara 向原	0.5 (0.31)	9.4 (5.8)		Toshima
SA25	Higashi-ikebukuro-yonchōme 東池袋四丁目	0.6 (0.37)	10.0 (6.2)	Yūrakuchō Line (Higashi-ikebukuro: Y-10)	Toshima
SA26	Toden-zōshigaya 都電雑司ヶ谷	0.2 (0.12)	10.2 (6.3)		Toshima
SA27	Kishibojimmae 鬼子母神前	0.5 (0.31)	10.7 (6.6)	Fukutoshin Line (Zoshigaya: F-10)	Toshima
SA28	Gakushūinshita 学習院下	0.5 (0.31)	11.2 (7.0)		Toshima
SA29	Omokagebashi 面影橋	0.5 (0.31)	11.7 (7.3)		Shinjuku
SA30	Waseda 早稲田	0.5 (0.31)	12.2 (7.6)		Shinjuku

== Rolling stock ==
- 7700 series (since 31 May 2016)
- 8500 series
- 8800 series
- 8900 series (since 18 September 2015)
- 9000 series
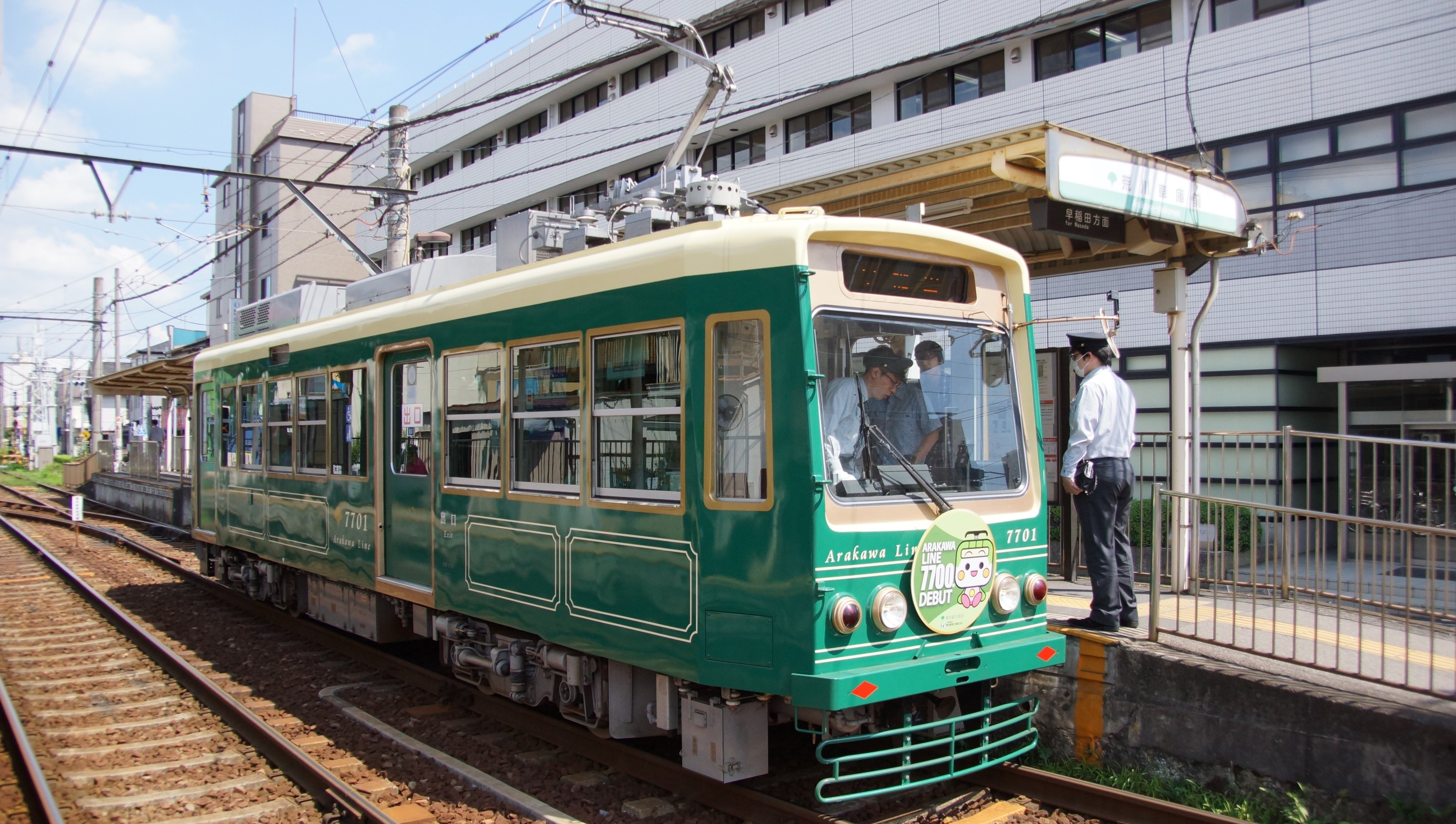
7700 series tram 7701 in July 2016

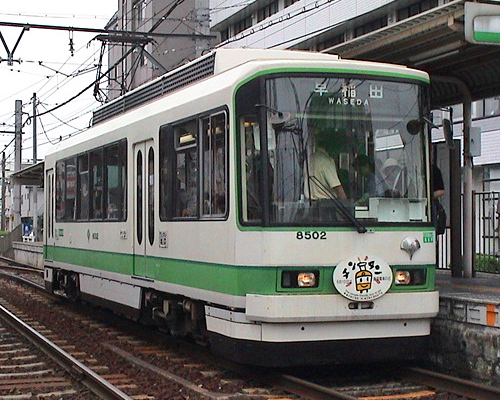
8500 series tram 8502 in June 2003

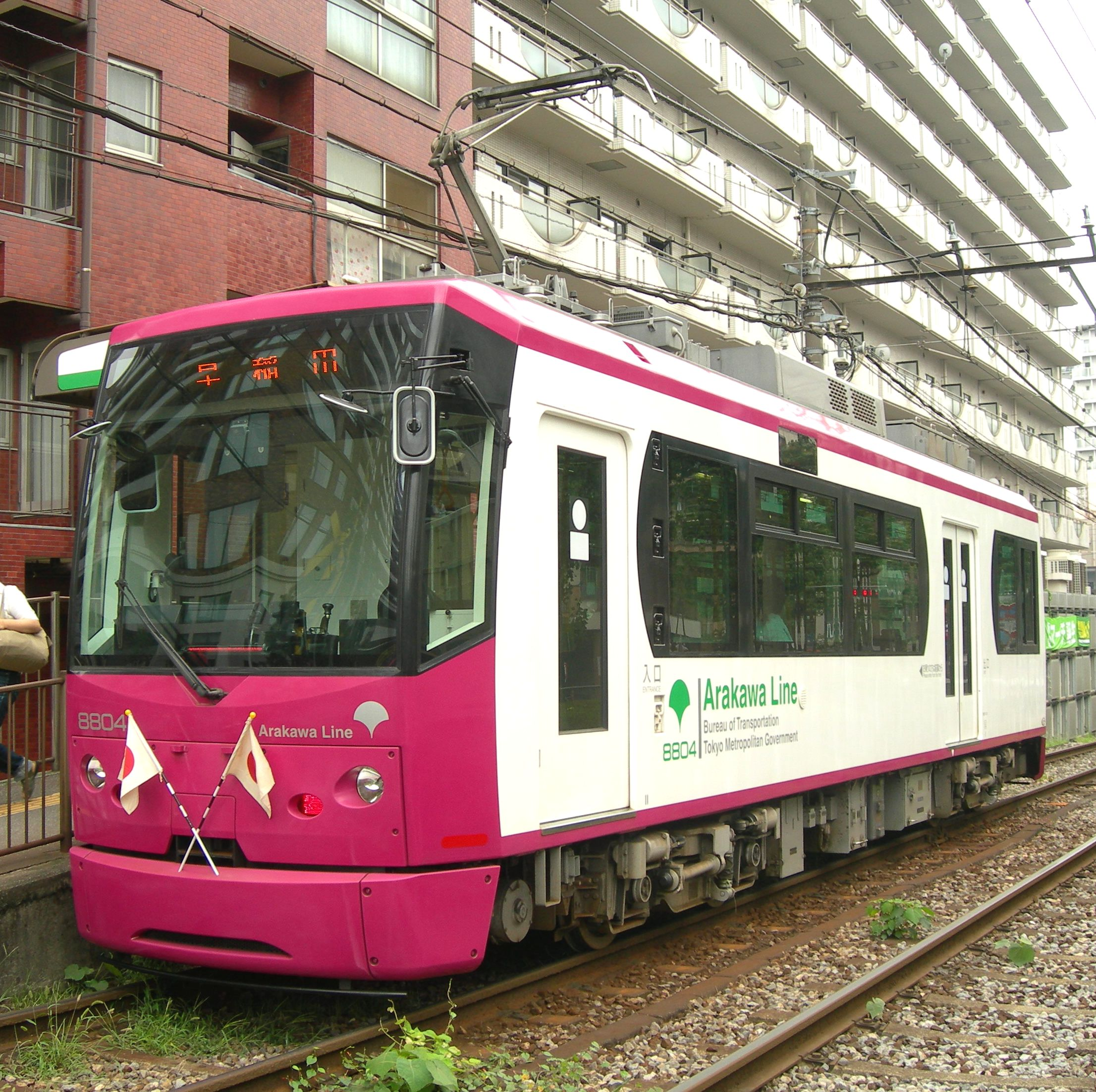
8800 series tram 8804 in September 2010

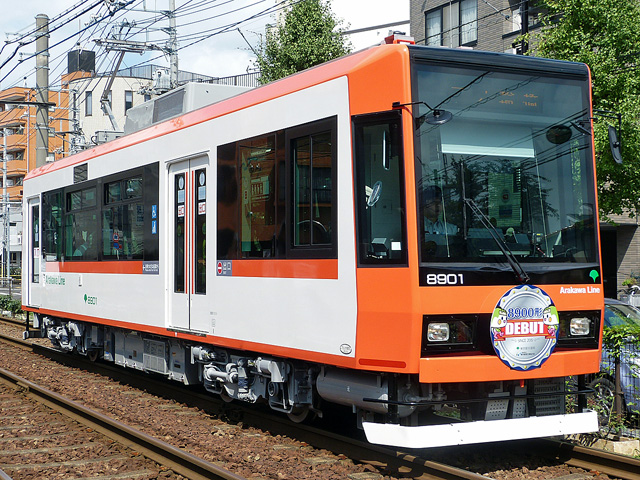
8900 series tram 8901 in September 2015

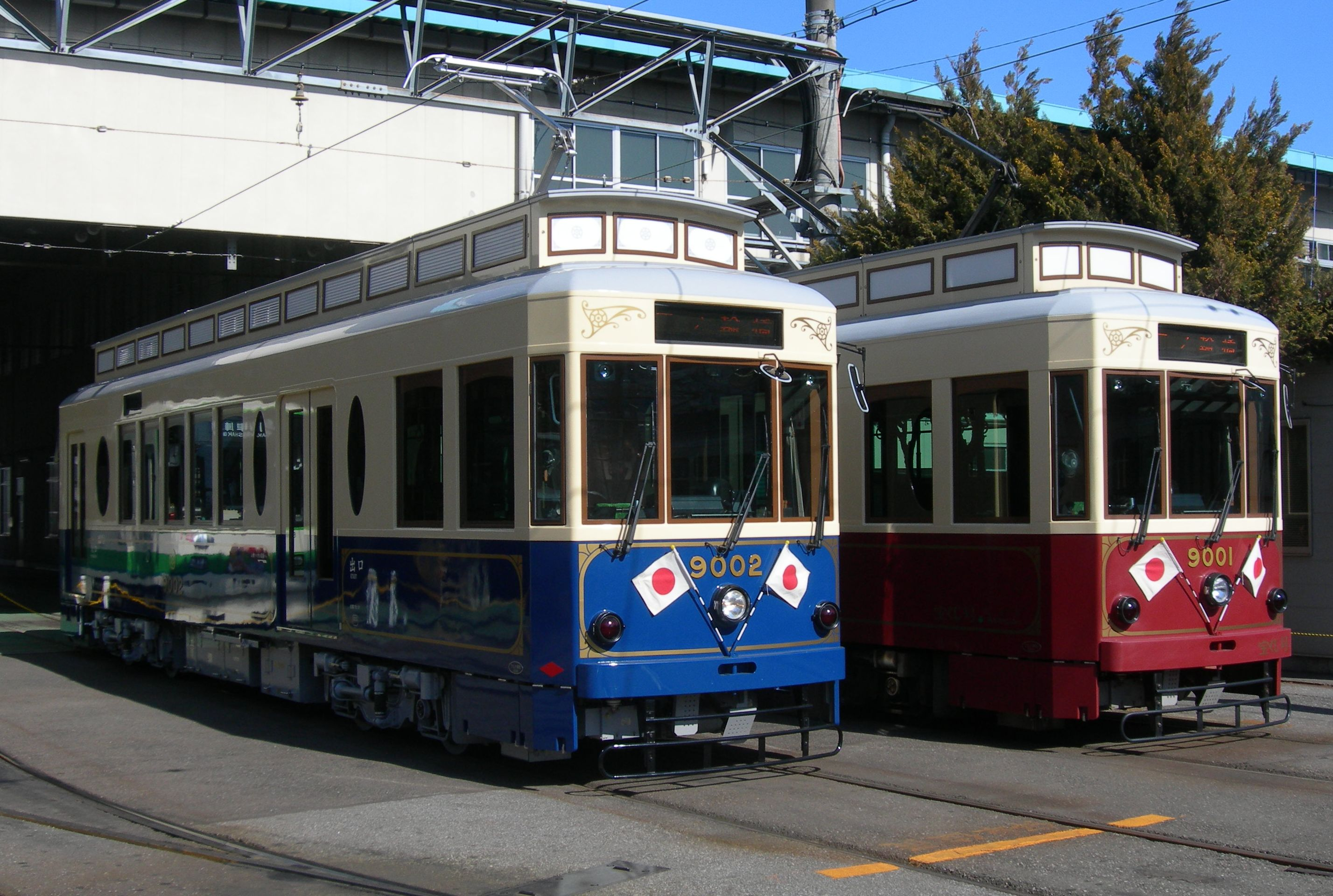
9000 series trams 9001 and 9002 in February 2009

=== Former rolling stock ===
- 7000 series (1955 until 10 June 2017)
- 7500 series (1962 until 13 March 2011)
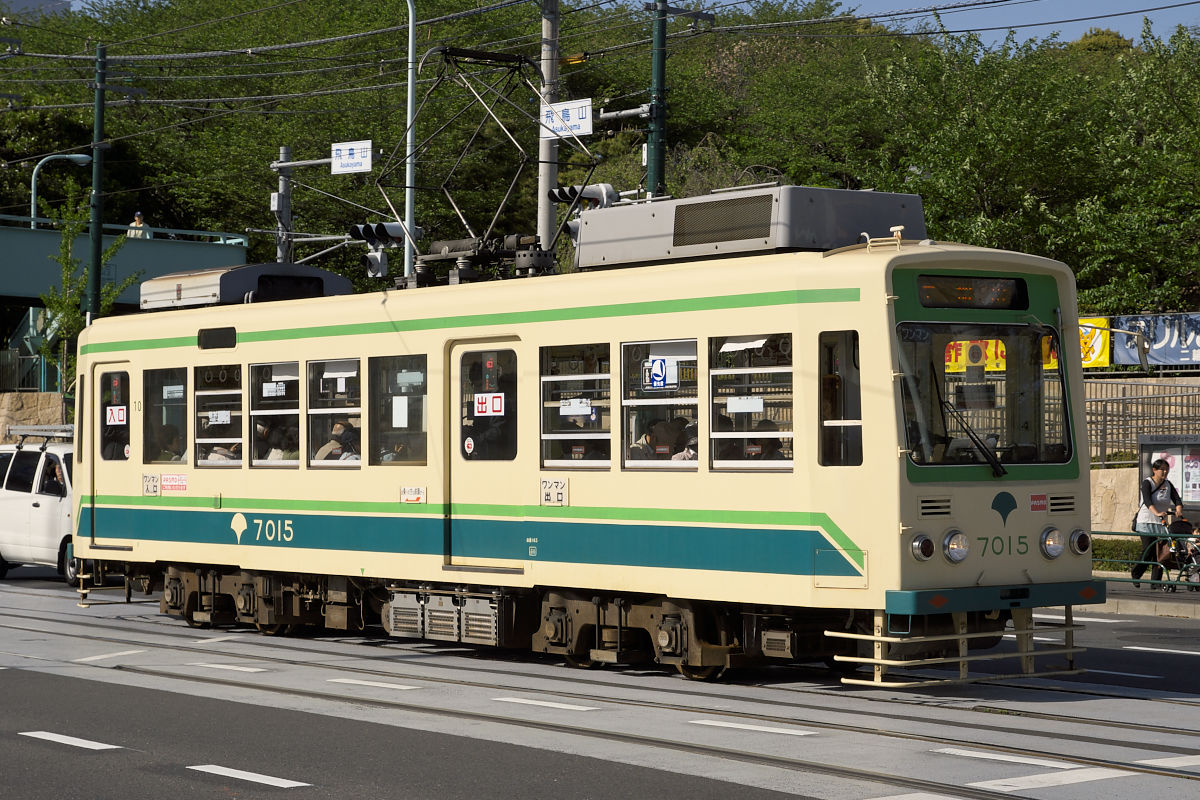
7000 series tram 7015 in June 2009

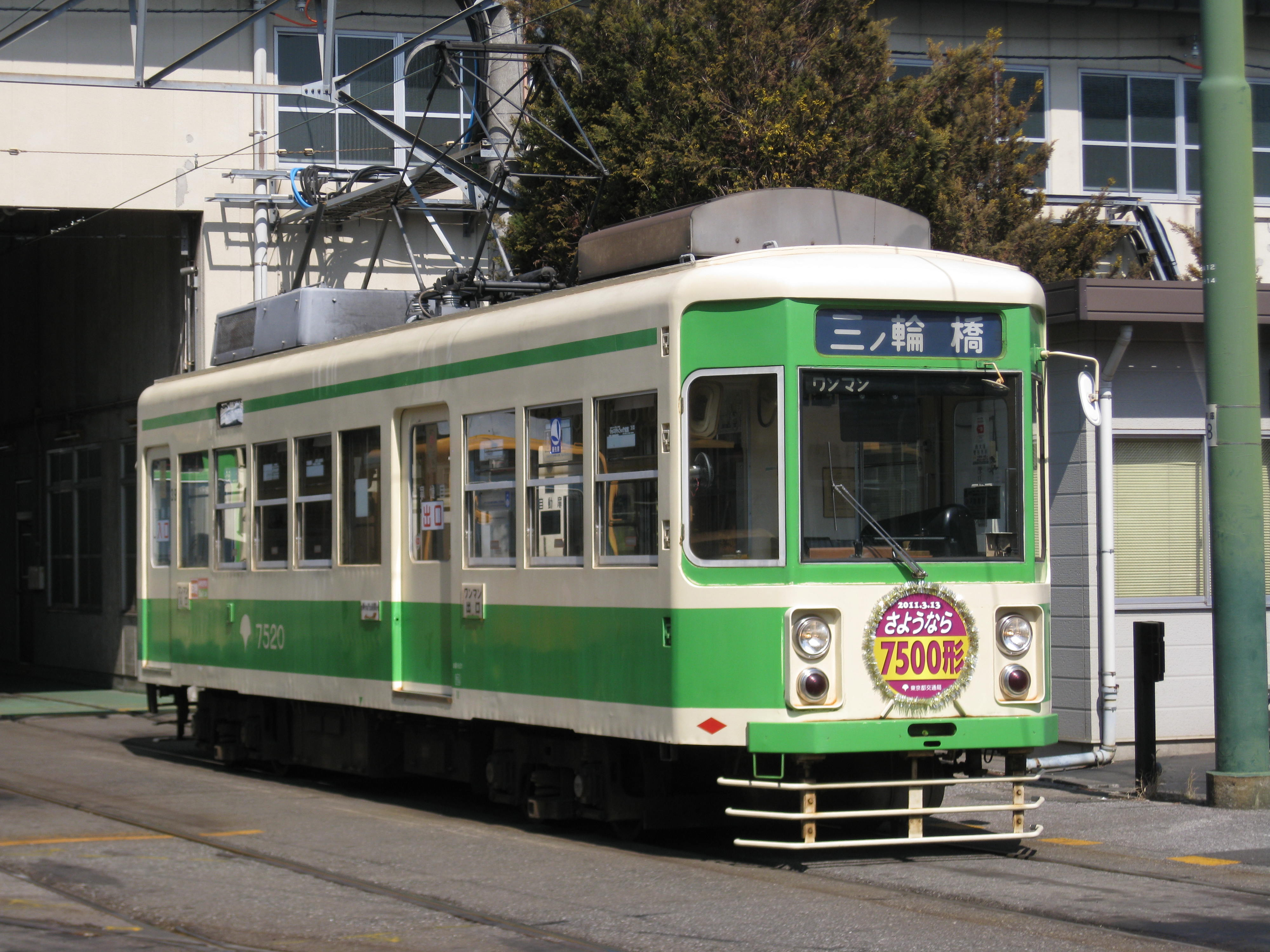
7500 series tram 7520 in March 2011

== History ==
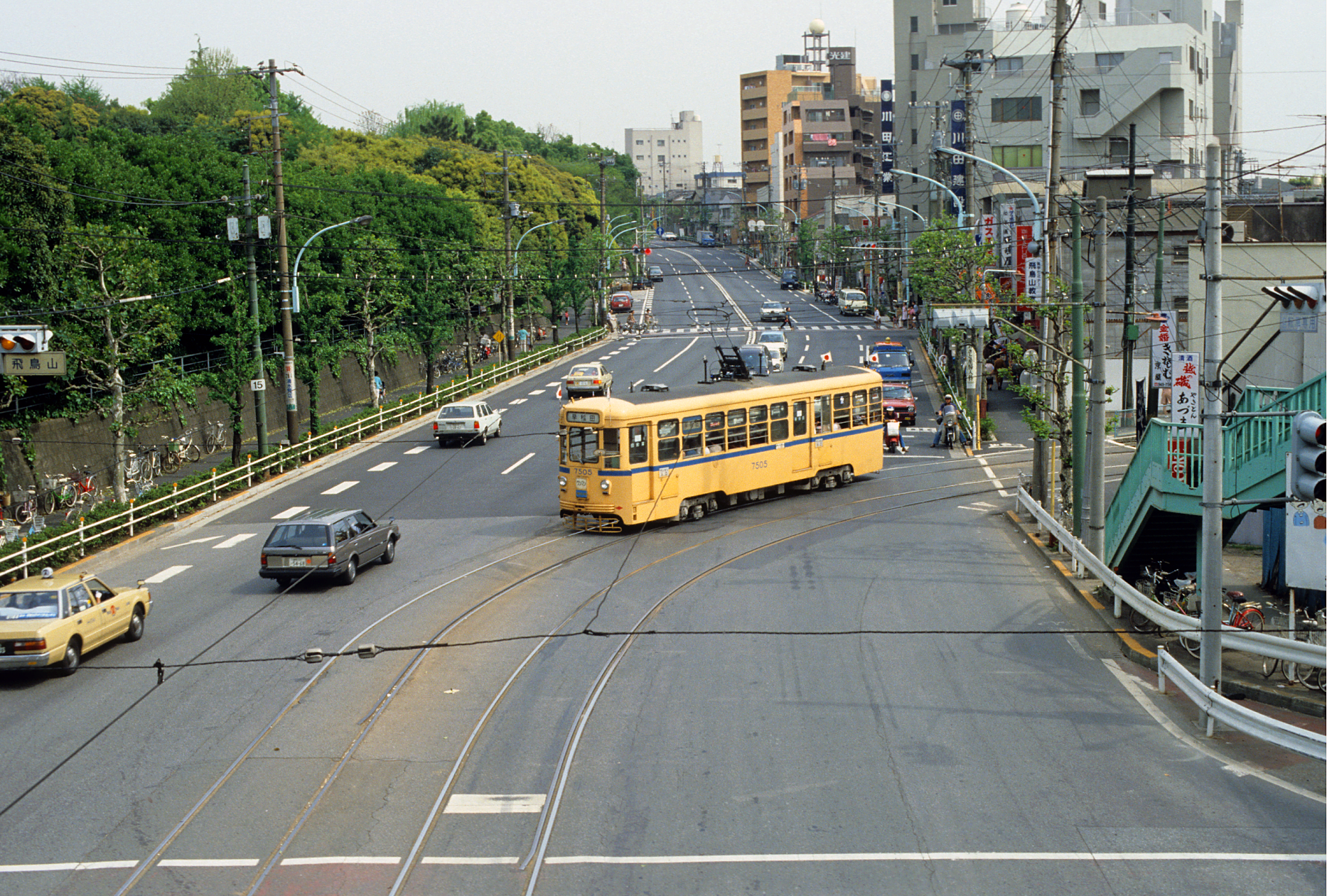
A tram near Asukayama Station in 1985.

The line was originally constructed by the Ōji Electric Tram Company (王子電気軌道, Ōji-denki-kidō) as a part of their extensive network, with the oldest section still operating today opened in 1913. The line was at threat of being shut down along with the rest of Tokyo's streetcar system in the 1960s, but concerted opposition from residents prevented this and parts of lines 27 (Minowabashi-Akabane) and 32 (Arakawa-Waseda) were merged to form the line as it is today. The line was sold to the Tokyo Metropolitan Bureau of Transportation in 1974, which renamed it the Toden Arakawa Line.

The Toden Arakawa Line operates between the terminals at Minowabashi Station and Waseda Station. It runs along Meiji Street between Asuka-yama Station and Oji Eki-mae Station. Otherwise, it operates on its own tracks. Presently, single driver-operated cars make the 12.2 km (7.6 mi) trip in 50 minutes. The gauge is 1,372 mm (4 ft 6 in). The line is fully double-track, and draws 600 V electrical supply.

Two Toden Arakawa trams (one in revenue earning service, the other undergoing brake testing) collided on 13 June 2006 near the Minowabashi terminus, injuring 27 people.

In 2017, the Tokyo Metropolitan Bureau of Transportation held a consultation for nicknames to promote the appeal of the Arakawa line both domestically and internationally. The name "Tokyo Sakura Tram" received the most public support, and was selected because it was "approachable for tourists".

== Sights ==
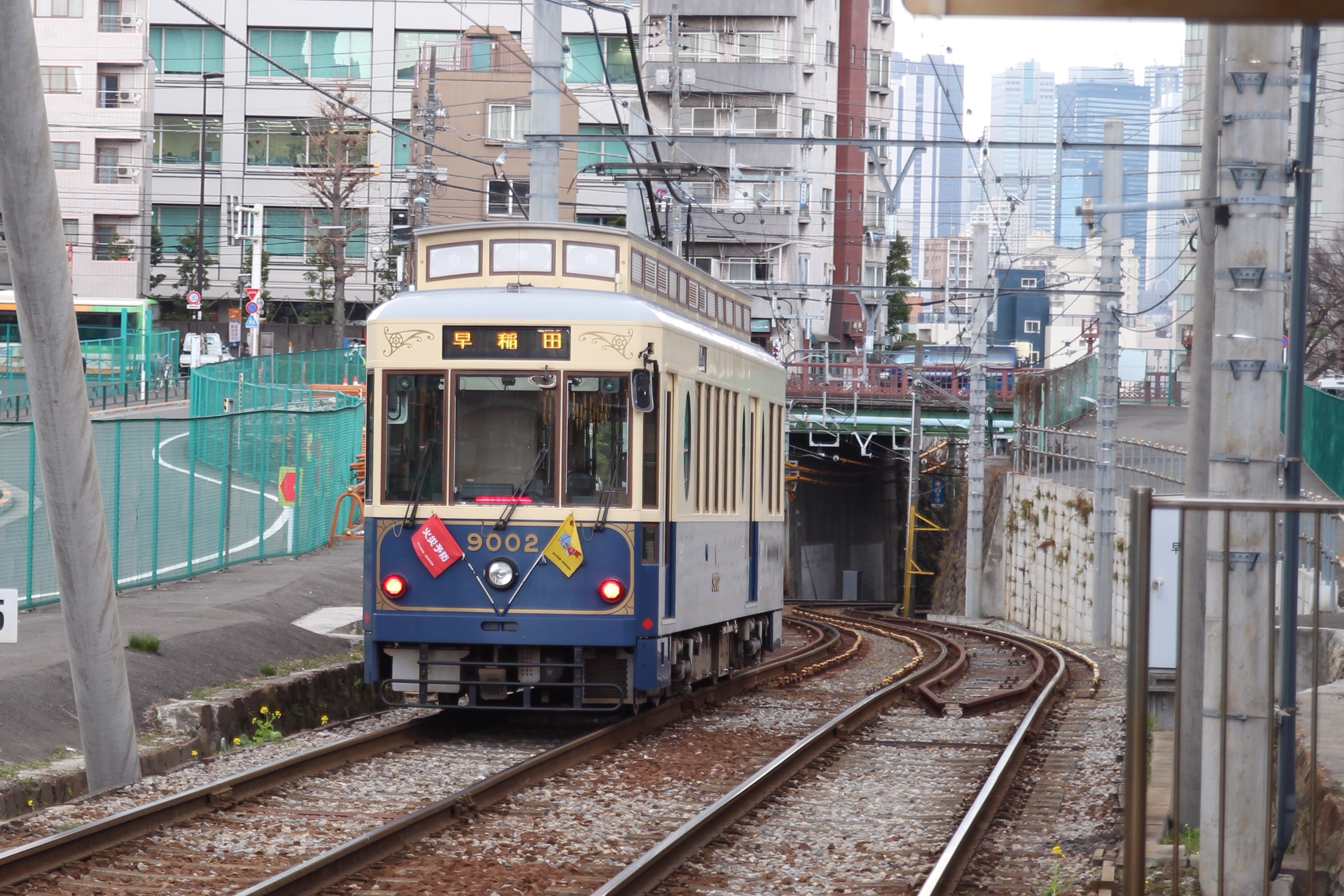
A Toden Arakawa line tram, near Kishibojinmae Station

The Toden Arakawa Line operates in northern and eastern Tokyo outside the main tourist areas. The terminus at Minowabashi is near the historical site of Edo's red-light district Yoshiwara which features a completely covered shopping street, several blocks long, in the once common "Ameyoko" style (a shōtengai).

== In literature ==
In Haruki Murakami's novel Norwegian Wood, protagonist Toru Watanabe takes the line to near Ōtsuka Station: "I sat in the last seat and watched the ancient houses passing close to the window. The tram almost touched the overhanging eaves.... The tram snaked its way through this private back-alley world."
