= Toei 7500 series =

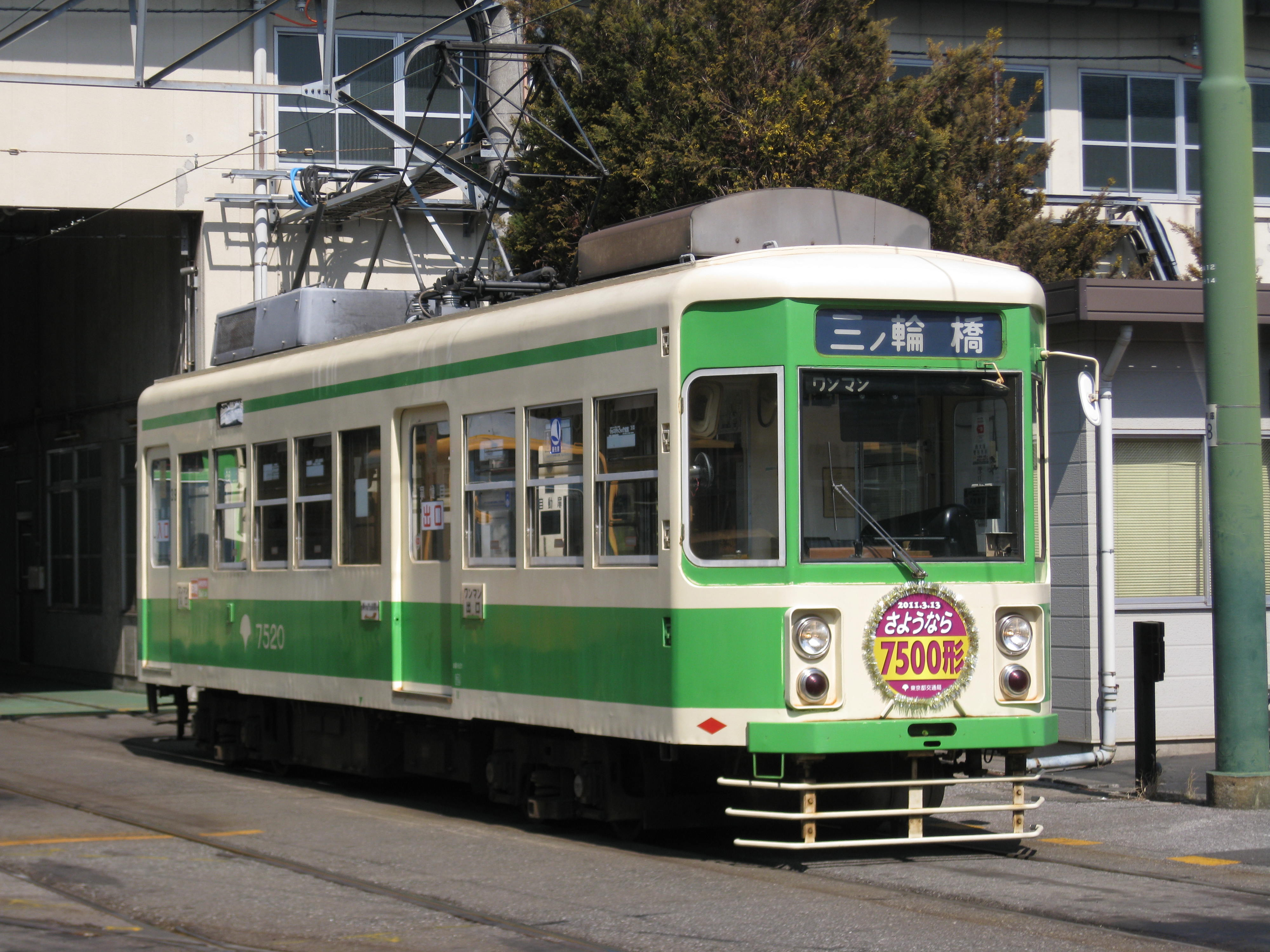
- 7500 series car 7520 on display following withdrawal in March 2011
- In service: 1962 – March 2011
- Manufacturers: Nippon Sharyo, Niigata Tekko
- Number built: 20 vehicles
- Number in service: None
- Formation: Single car
- Fleet numbers: 7501–7520
- Operator: Tokyo Metropolitan Bureau of Transportation
- Depot: Arakawa
- Line served: Toden Arakawa Line

Specifications
- Car body construction: Steel
- Doors: 2 sliding doors per side
- Electric system: 600 V DC Overhead wire
- Current collection: Pantograph
- Track gauge: 1,372 mm (4 ft 6 in)

The Toei 7500 series (東京都交通局7500形) was a tramcar type operated by Tokyo Metropolitan Bureau of Transportation (Toei) on the Toden Arakawa Line in Tokyo, Japan from 1962 until March 2011.

== Operations ==
The fleet was based at Arakawa Depot, operating on the sole remaining tram line in Tokyo, the Toden Arakawa Line.

== History ==
20 7500 series tramcars were introduced from 1962.

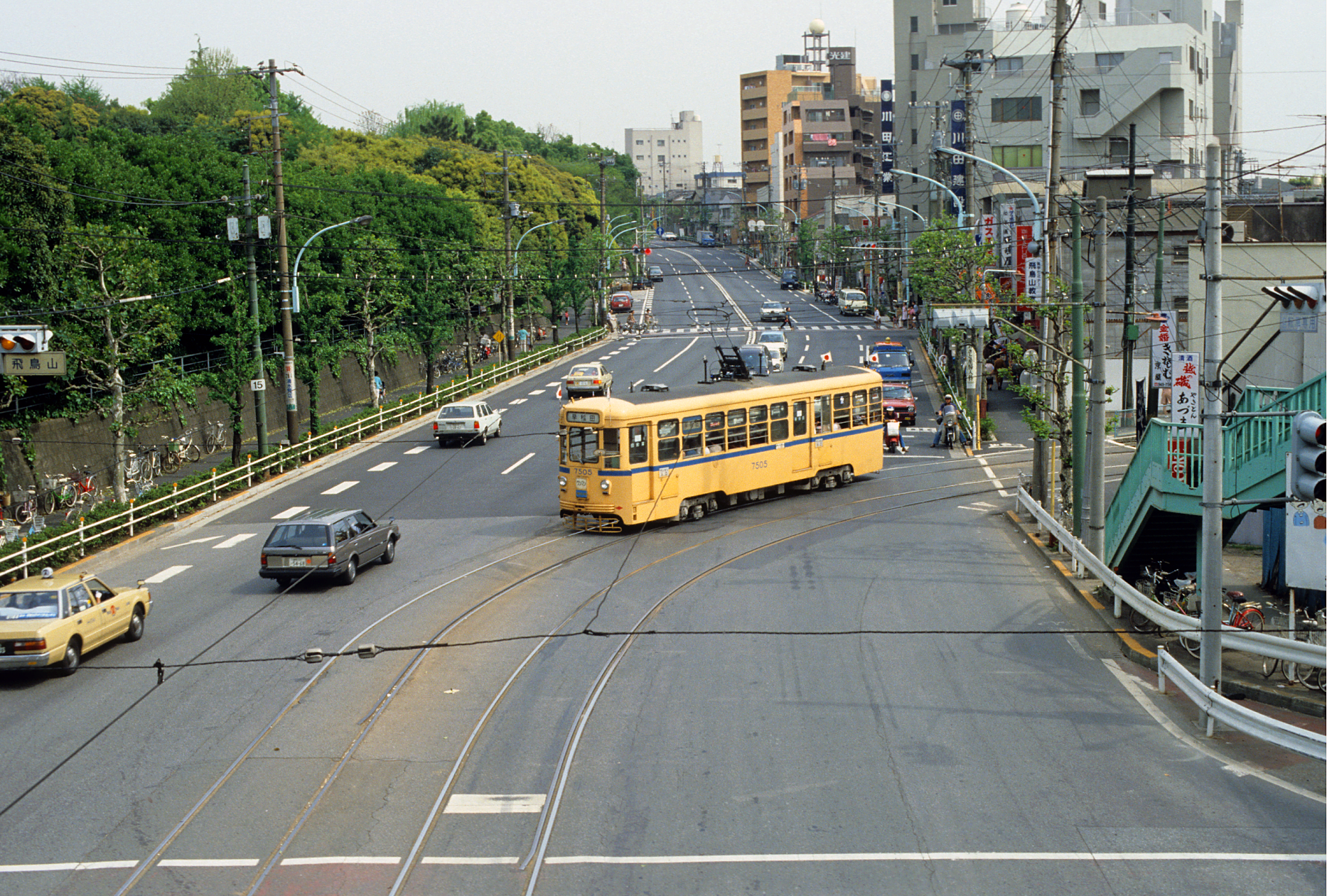
7505 in 1985 before rebuilding

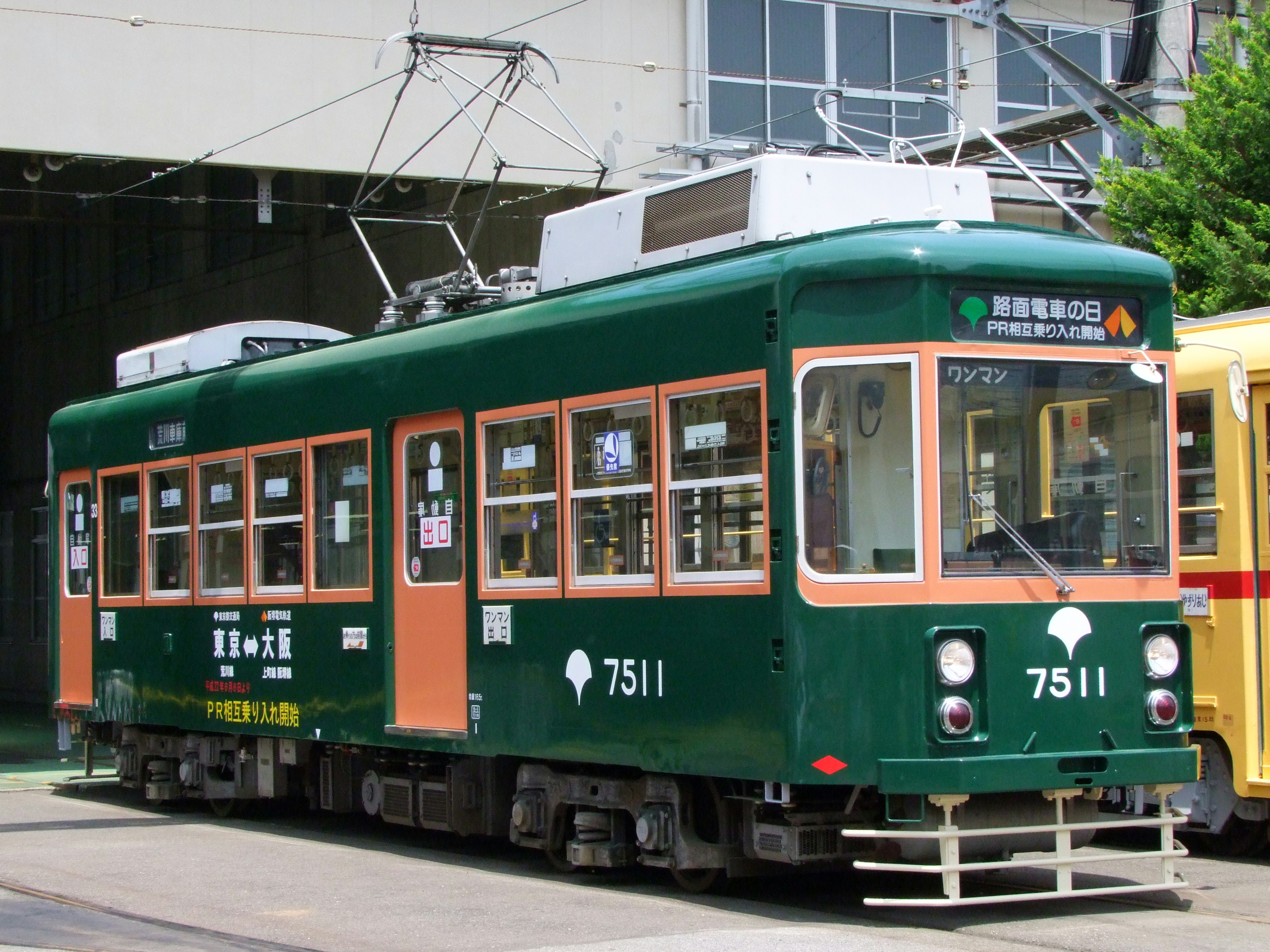
7511 in former Hankai livery in June 2010

The last two remaining 7500 series cars in service were withdrawn on 13 March 2011.

== Preserved examples ==
- 7506, at Ikenohata Park in Taito Ward, Tokyo
- 7514, at the Edo-Tokyo Open Air Architectural Museum
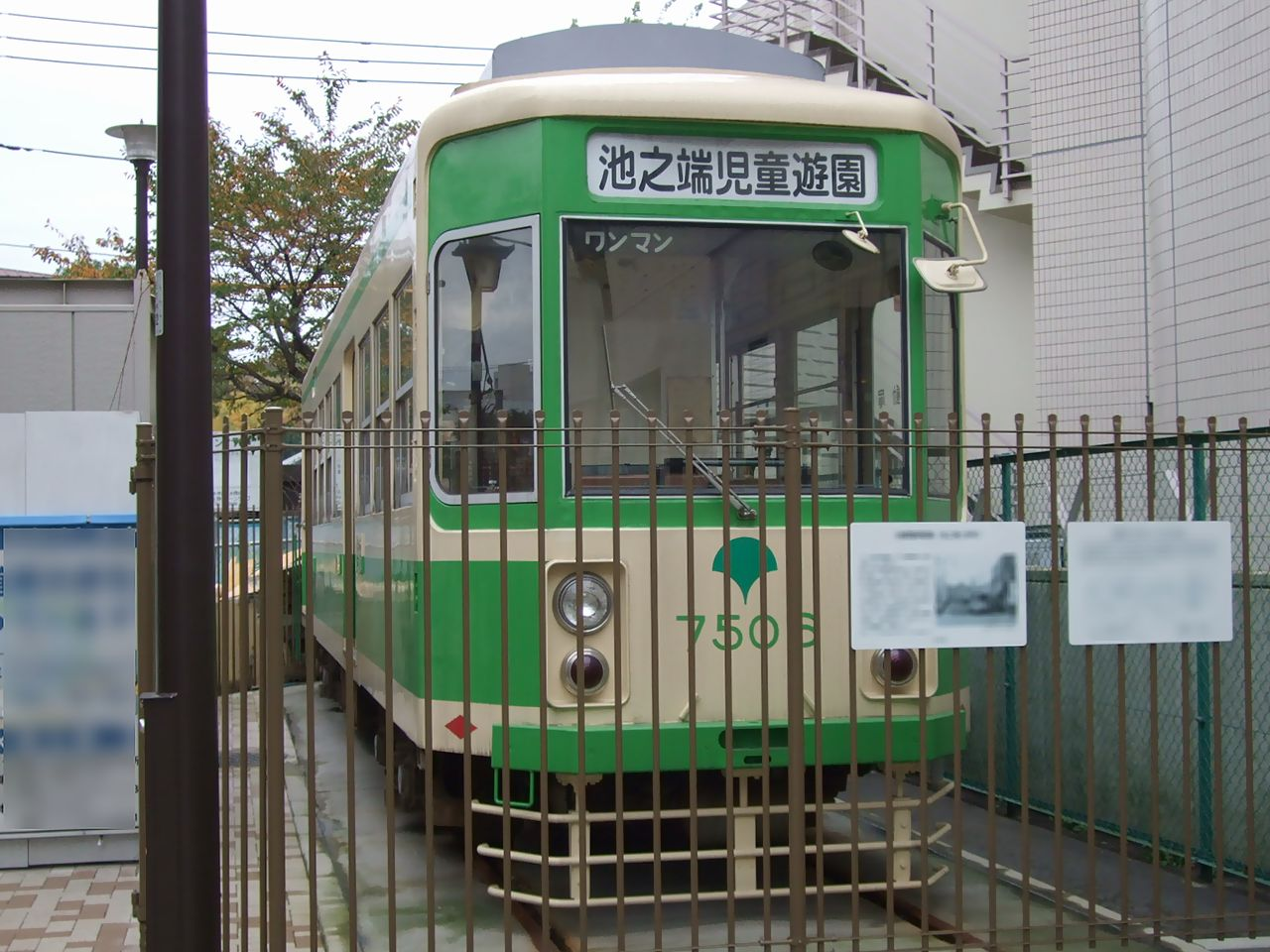
Preserved car 7506

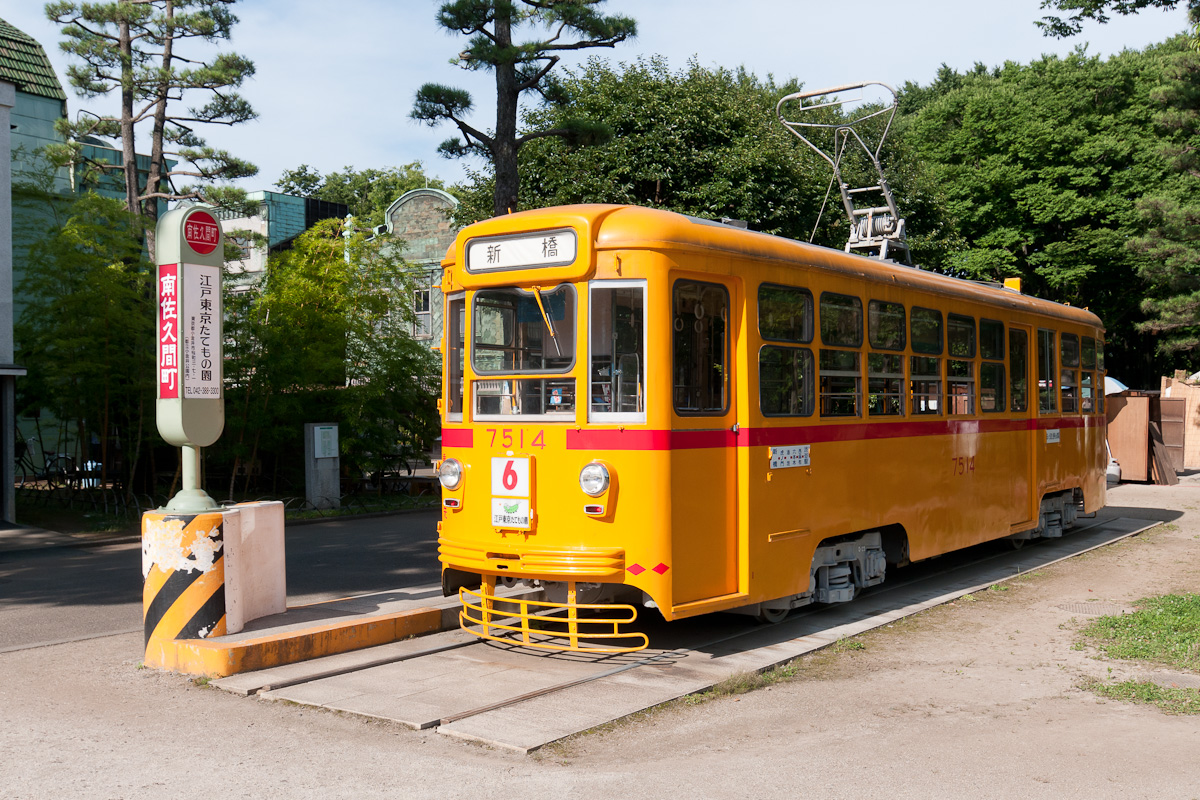
Preserved car 7514
