= Waseda Station (Toden) =

Tram station in Tokyo, Japan

Coordinates: 35°42′43″N 139°43′09″E

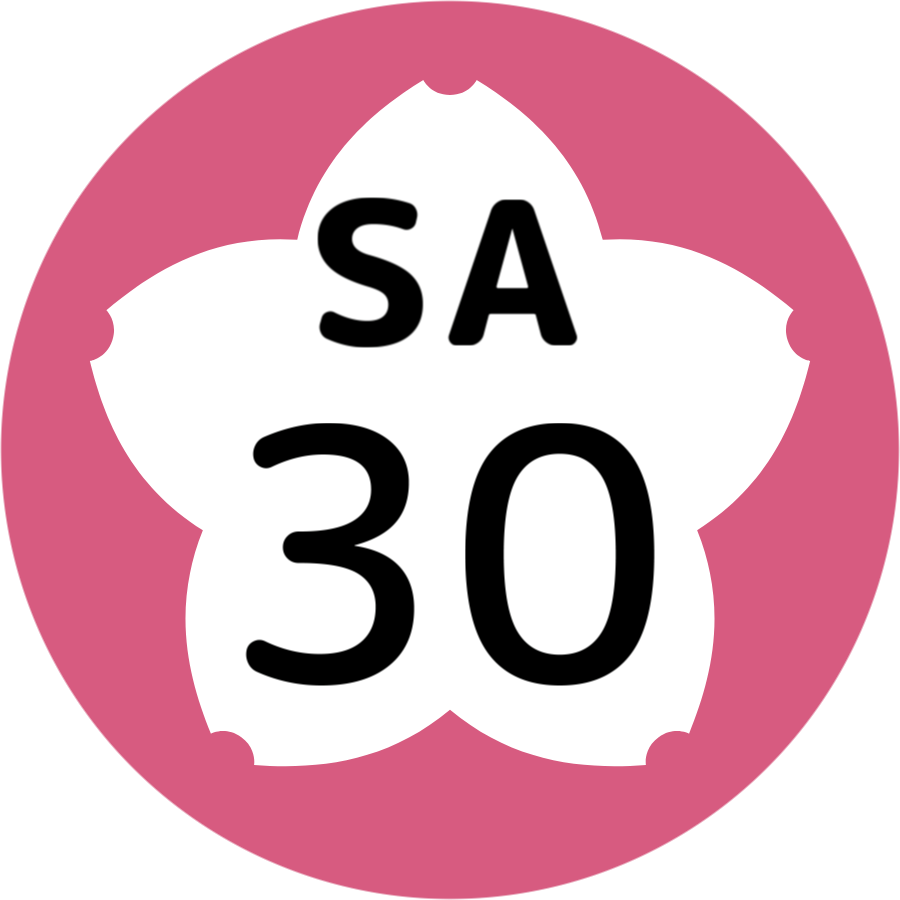
Waseda Station 早稲田停留場

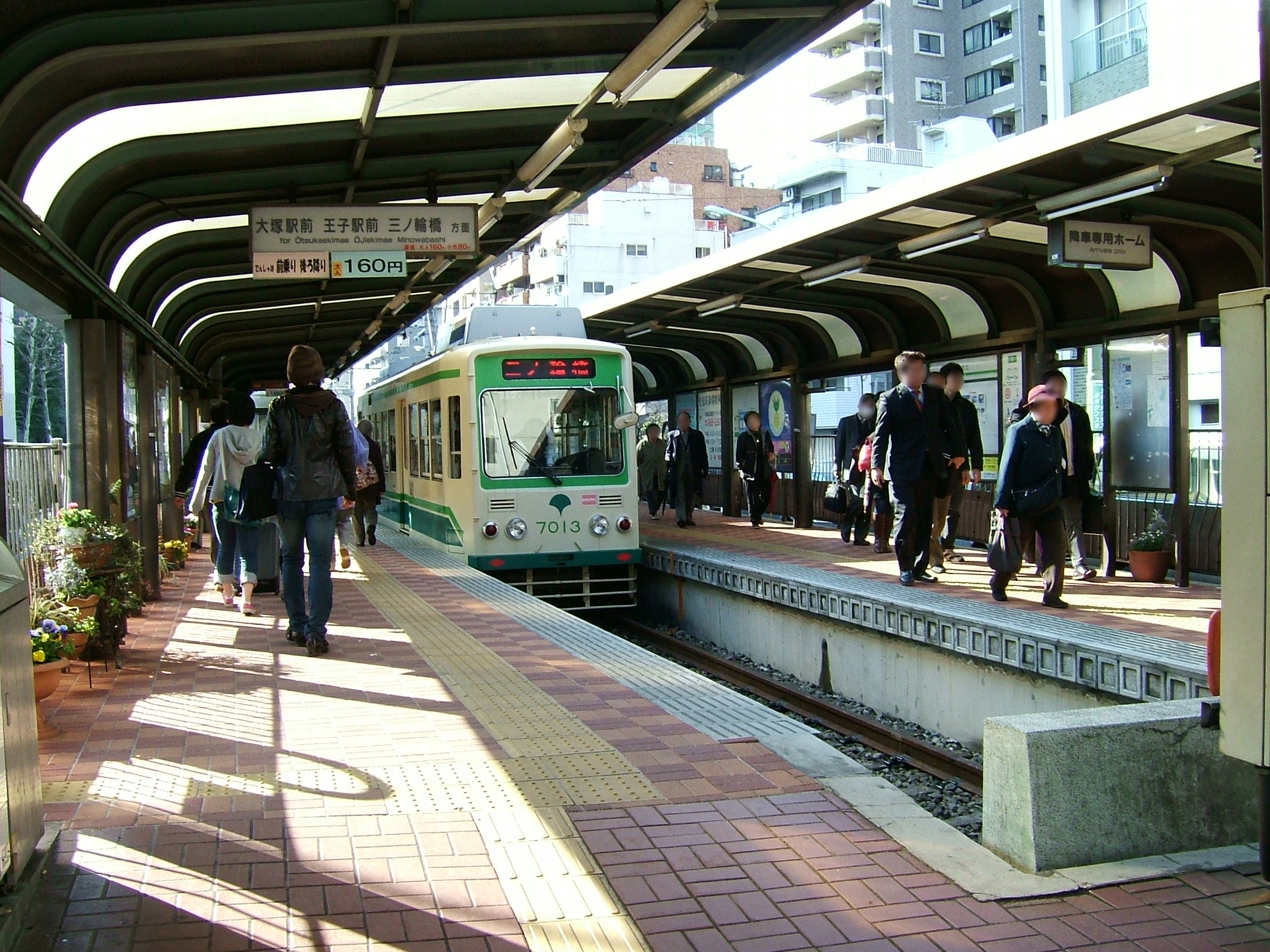

General information
- Location: Nishi-Waseda 1-chome, Shinjuku Ward, Tokyo; Japan
- Operator: Toei
- Line: Toden Arakawa Line
- Platforms: 1 bay platform
- Tracks: 1

Construction
- Structure type: At grade

Other information
- Station code: SA30

History
- Opened: 6 July 1918; 108 years ago

Passengers
- 2019: 3,179

Services
Preceding station	Toei	Following station
Terminus	Toden Arakawa Line	Omokagebashi towards Minowabashi
Location
- Location within Tokyo Yamanote Loop Location within Special wards of Tokyo Location within Japan

Waseda Station (Japanese: 早稲田停留場, Hepburn: Waseda teiryūjō) is a tram stop in Tokyo, Japan, operated by the Tokyo Metropolitan Bureau of Transportation on the Toden Arakawa Line (branded as the Tokyo Sakura Tram). Located in Nishiwaseda 1-chome, Shinjuku Ward, it is the terminus of the Toden Arakawa Line, located on Shin-Mejiro-dori Avenue. It is unconnected to Waseda Station, 600 metres away, on the Tokyo Metro Tozai Line.

== History ==
The Edogawa Line, originally opened by the Tokyo Municipal Electric Bureau (predecessor to the Tokyo Metropolitan Bureau of Transportation), existed at the site of the current station, along with a streetcar depot. The Oji Electric Tramway subsequently extended its operations to the station. Later, the Oji Electric Tramway's line was incorporated into the municipal streetcar network; the Edogawa Line was eventually discontinued, leading to the current configuration.

=== Timeline ===
- 6 July 1918: Opened concurrently with the launch of the Tokyo Municipal Streetcar Edogawa Line section between Edogawabashi and Waseda.
- 30 March 1930: Oji Electric Tramway opened the section between Omokagebashi and Waseda.
- 17 January 1932: The Oji Electric Tramway stop was relocated.
- 1 February 1942: Tokyo City acquired the Oji Electric Tramway; the line became the Tokyo Municipal Streetcar Waseda Line (currently the Arakawa Line).
- 1 December 1949: The Edogawa Line and Waseda Line were connected.
- 29 September 1968: The Edogawa Line was discontinued. The Waseda Depot was closed at the same time, and the site was converted into the Toei Bus Waseda Office.

== Station Layout ==
A surface-level station featuring two platforms serving a single track (a bay platform). Platforms are located on the north and south sides of the track; the north platform is for alighting only, while the south platform is for boarding only. Within the station premises, the Arakawa Line transitions from double tracks to a single track heading toward the terminus; the alighting platform extends into the double-track section. At this stop, trams begin boarding passengers after completing the disembarkation process; however, if a following tram arrives while this is underway, the following tram stops on the double-track section to allow passengers to disembark.

Boarding Platform	Line	Direction	Destination
North Side	Toden Arakawa Line (Tokyo Sakura Tram)	-	Disembarkation Only
South Side	Toden Arakawa Line (Tokyo Sakura Tram)	Inbound	Towards Minowabashi

- Before Shin-Mejiro-dori Avenue was widened, the tracks ran on a dedicated right-of-way flanked by houses; during the road expansion, the Toden tracks were relocated to the center of the road, alongside the relocation of the houses, resulting in the current layout. The former track alignment was converted into a roadway for traffic heading towards Takatobashi Bridge.
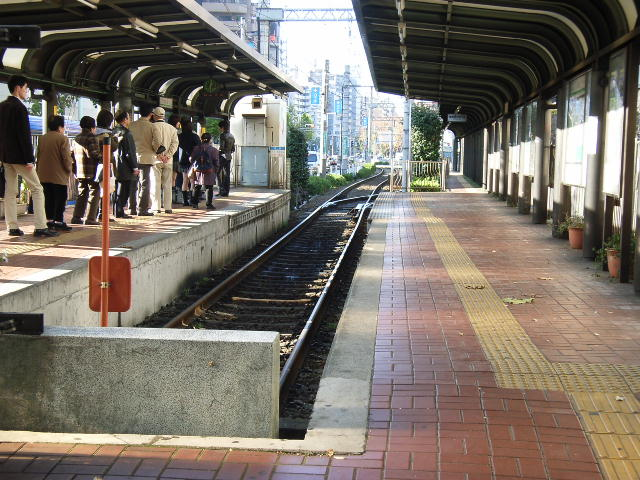
  Platform before the signage renewal (December 2004)
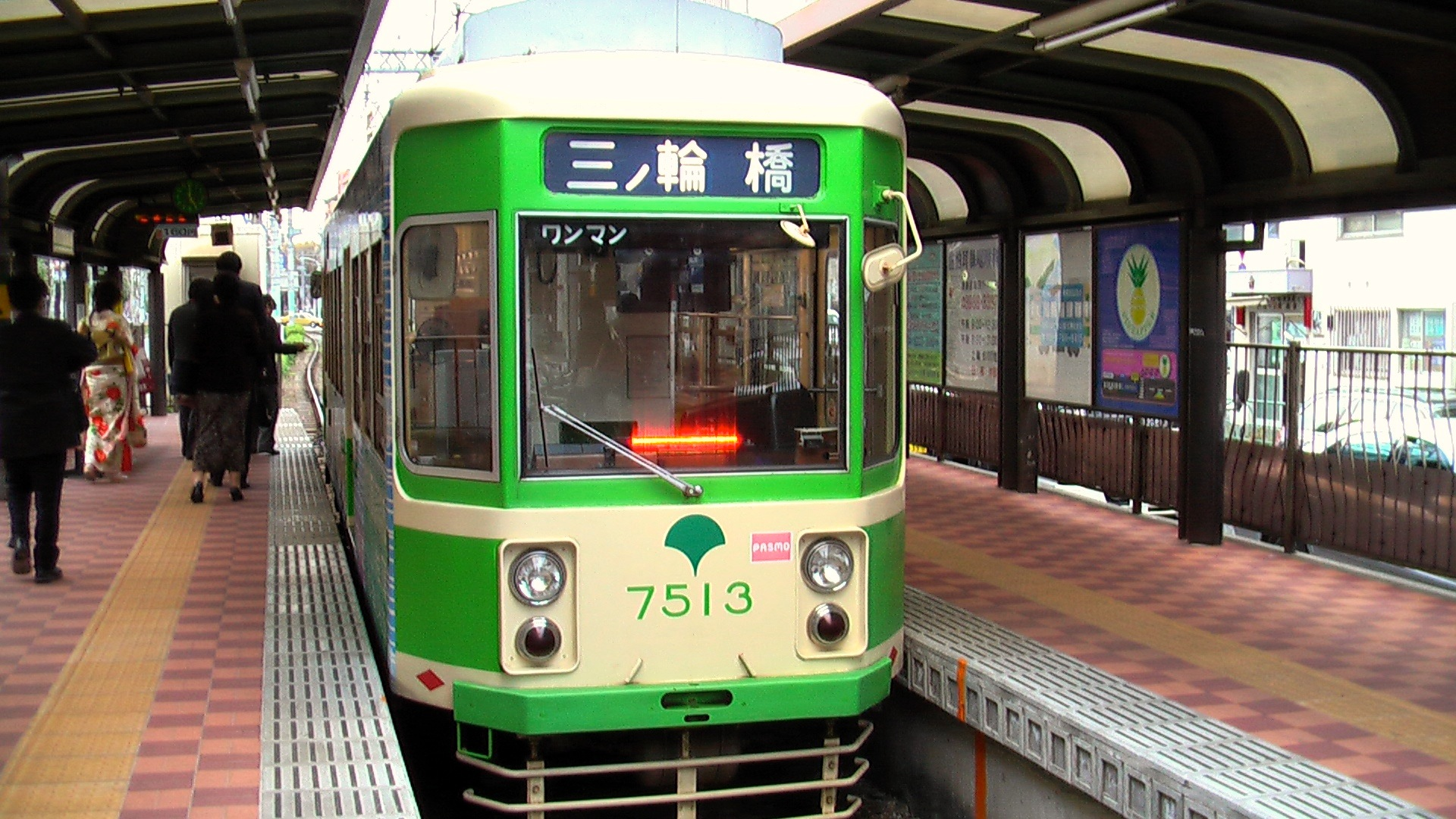
  A 7500 series tram stopped at the station (March 2008)
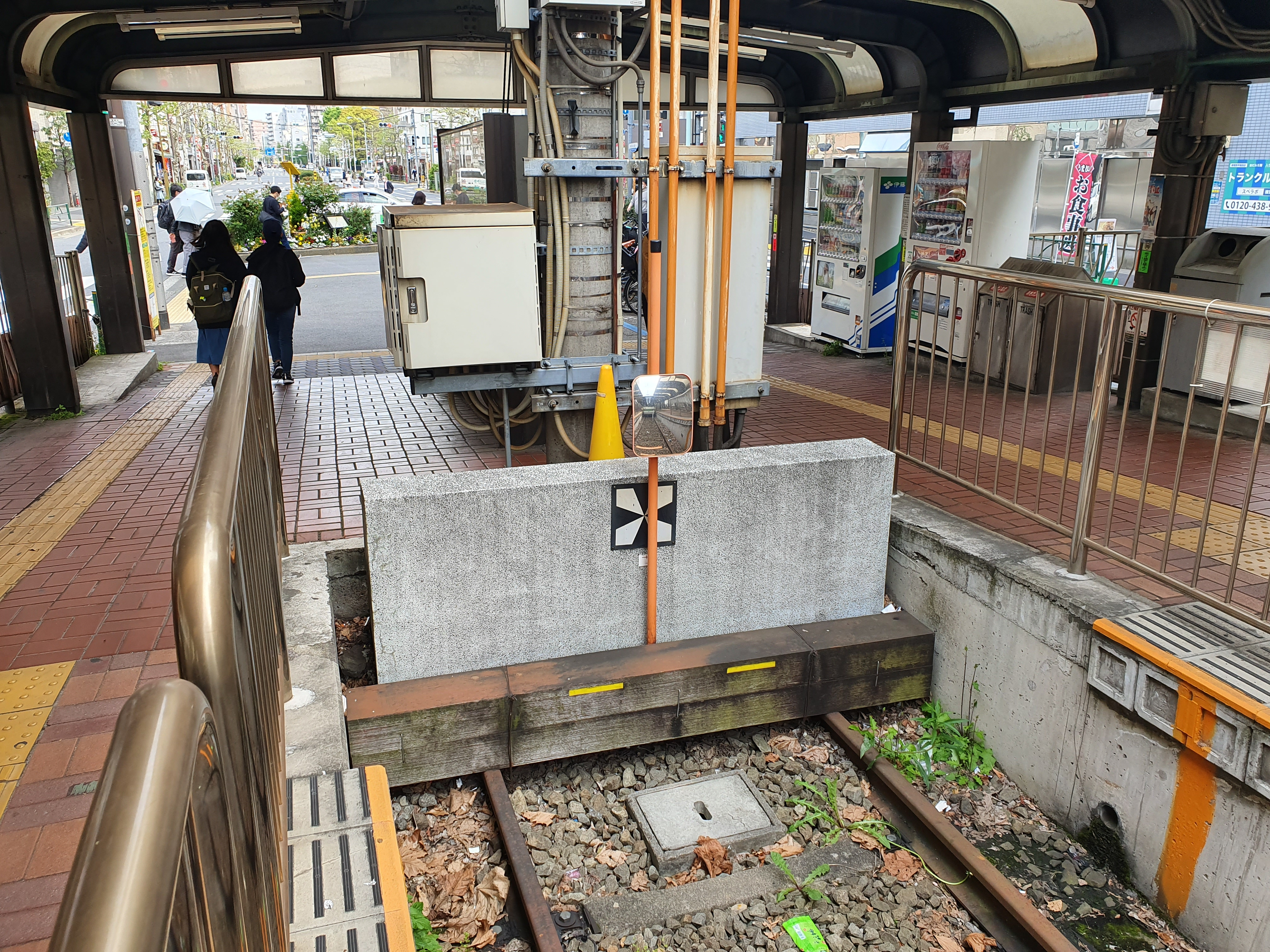
  Bumper/buffer stop

== Near the Station ==
- Waseda University Waseda Campus (University headquarters, Okuma Auditorium, etc.)
- Japan Women's University Mejiro Campus
- Hotel Chinzanso Tokyo
- Kansen-en Park
- Toei Bus Waseda Depot – Also handles sales of Arakawa Line commuter passes and distribution of timetables.
- Mejirodai 1-chome (Mejiro Goten / Former Residence of Kakuei Tanaka)

== Bus routes ==
Two bus stops, "Grand-zaka-shita" and "Waseda", are located near the Toei Bus Waseda Depot on Shin-Mejiro-dori Avenue. The "Kansen-en Koen-mae" stop, located to the southwest on Loop Route No. 4, is also nearby.

Bus stops 5 through 7 are designated as the "Waseda-daigaku Seimon" (Waseda University Main Gate) stop, while bus stops 8 through 12 are designated as the "Babashitacho" stop (near Waseda Station on the Tozai Line).
