= Waseda, Tokyo =

Area in Shinjuku, Tokyo, Japan

Waseda, Tokyo 早稲田
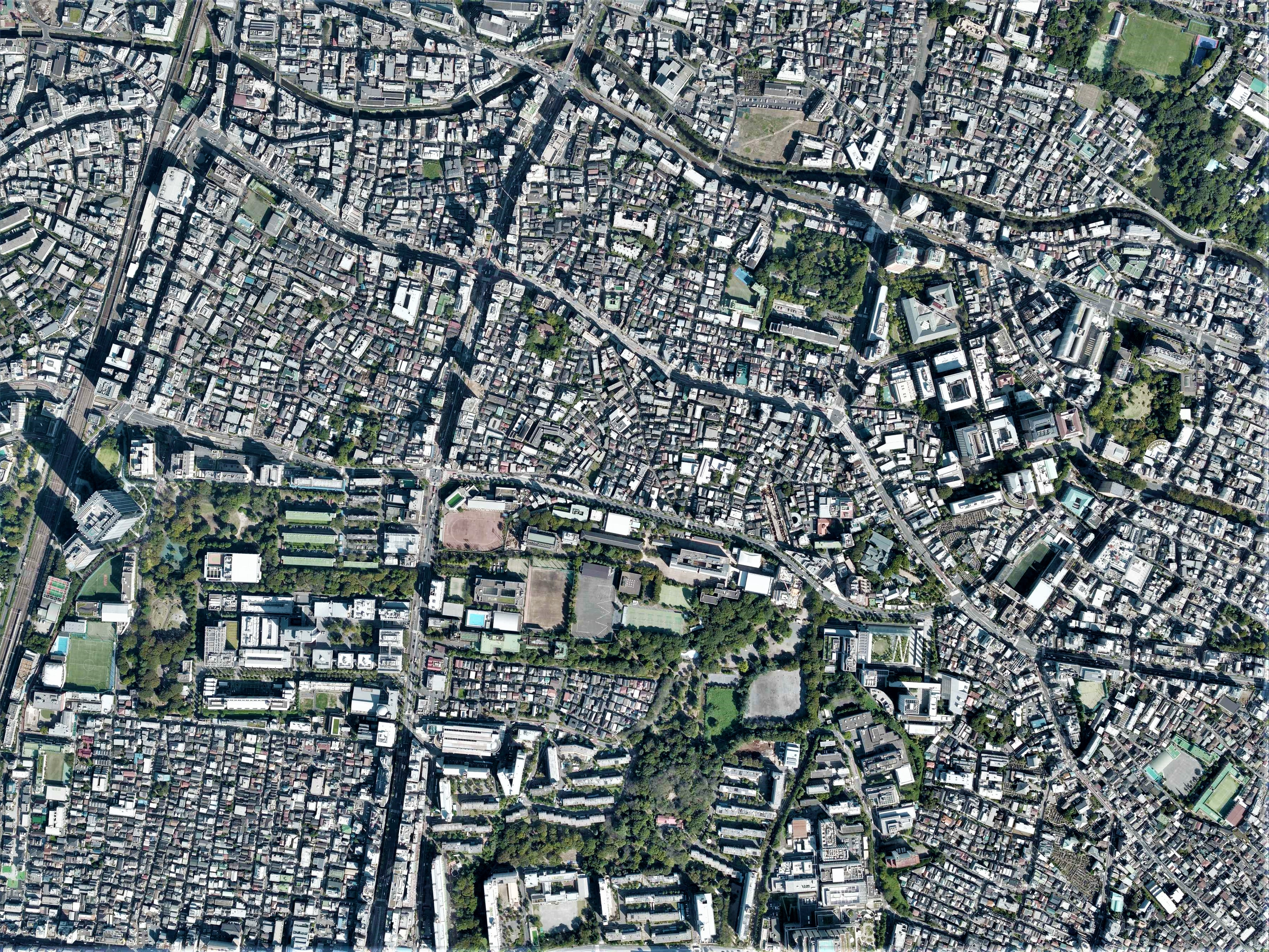
- Aerial photograph of the Waseda area in 2019.
- Country: Japan
- Prefecture: Tokyo
- Special ward: Shinjuku

Waseda (Japanese: 早稲田; lit. Early-Rice Field) is a broad geographical name referring to an area in Shinjuku, Tokyo.

== Area ==
- Nishi-Waseda
- Waseda-machi
- Waseda-minamicho
- Waseda-tsurumakicho
- Totsuka
- Babashitacho
- Toyama
- Kikuicho
- Haramachi
- Bentencho

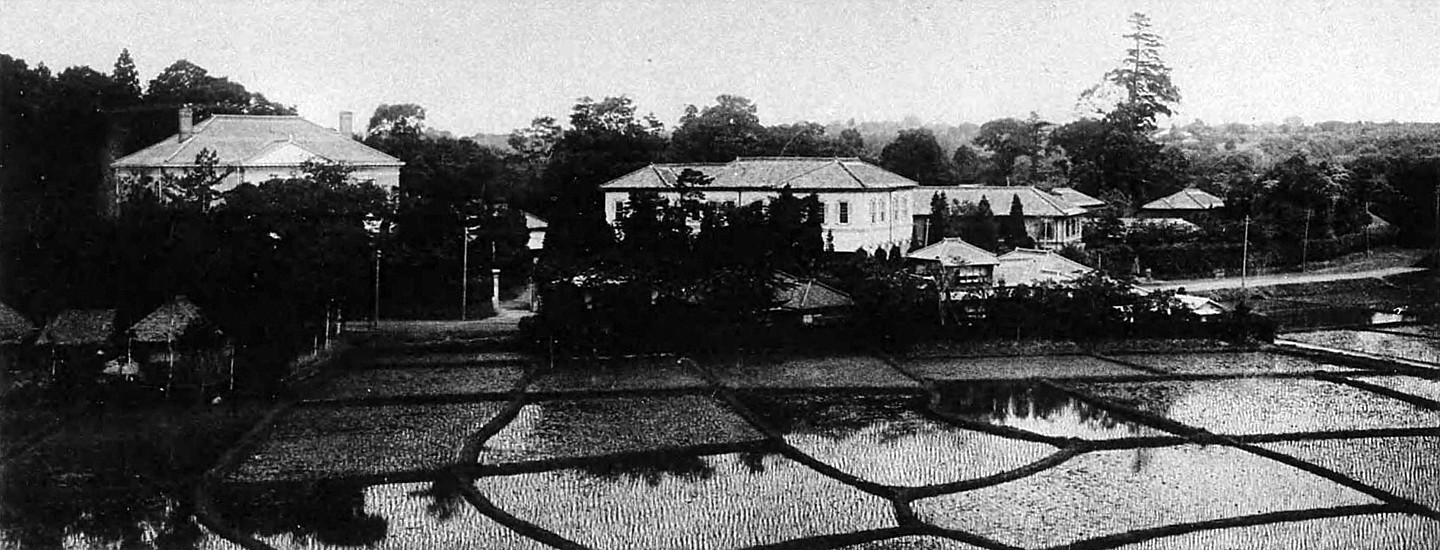
Tokyo Senmon Gakko c. 1890

Historically, the Waseda area was part of the village of Ushigome as the Waseda aza (sub-district) of Edo-Ushigome Village, but in the early Edo period, it became a separate village known as "Waseda village." Following the establishment of Tokyo Prefecture in 1868, it became Ushigome-Waseda Village in Minami-Toshima District. In 1878, Ushigome Ward was created within Tokyo Prefecture under the Law on the Organization of Counties, Wards, Towns, and Villages, and Waseda Village was placed inside Ushigome Ward. Subsequently, in 1889, with the establishment of Tokyo City following the enactment of the municipal and town/village systems, Ushigome Ward of Tokyo City incorporated Ushigome-Waseda Village of Minami-Toshima District. In 1943, with the implementation of the Tokyo Metropolis system, the area was reorganized into districts such as Waseda-machi and Waseda-Tsurumaki-cho within Ushigome Ward, Tokyo Metropolis.

Although it was originally a rural area dominated by rice paddies, it developed into a student district and an educational hub following the opening of Tōkyō Professional School (later Waseda University).

The area currently houses Waseda University's main campus (Waseda Campus), the Faculty of Letters, Arts and Sciences campus (Toyama Campus), and the Kikui-cho Campus, as well as the Faculty of Science and Engineering campus (Nishi-Waseda Campus), which is situated across Meiji-dori Avenue. The neighborhood is home to a large student population, with Gakushuin University's Toyama Campus located between the Waseda and Nishi-Waseda campuses; Japan Women's University to the north in Toshima Ward; Tokyo Women's Medical University to the south of the Toyama Campus; and various vocational schools scattered around Takadanobaba Station. Numerous businesses catering to students, such as boarding houses, restaurants, real estate agencies, and bookstores, operate in the area, and the district features one of Tokyo's largest concentrations of secondhand bookstores, particularly along Waseda-dori Avenue. While the bookbinding and printing industries once flourished here as local trades, the scale of these industries is currently in decline. Foot traffic fluctuates significantly during summer and spring breaks, and some restaurants operate only while classes are in session.

Among students, there is a tendency to regard the entire area, including Takadanobaba, as "Waseda."

Yabusame (horseback archery) has been performed at Anahachiman Shrine since the Edo period; currently, the event takes place on 10 October at nearby Toyama Park. Toyama Park is home to Mt. Hakone, the highest hill inside the area of the Tokyo Yamanote Line. Additionally, the shrine becomes crowded every year between the winter solstice and Setsubun with people seeking the "Ichiyo-Raifuku" (Return of Spring/Good Fortune) amulet.

== Transport ==
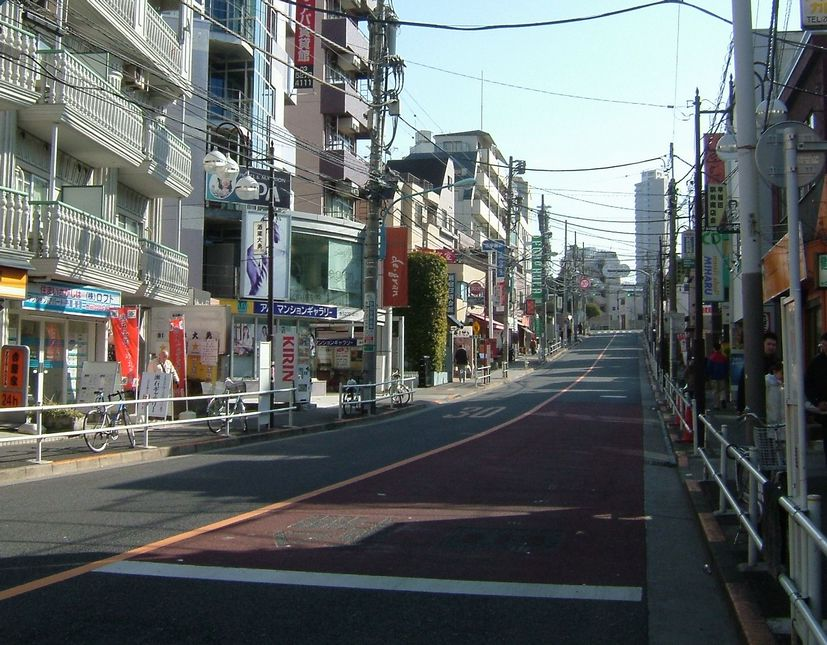
Natsume-zaka

=== Railway ===
- Tokyo Metro
  - Tozai line (Waseda Station)
  - Fukutoshin Line (Nishi-waseda Station)
- Tokyo Metropolitan Bureau of Transportation
  - Toden Arakawa Line (Waseda Station)

=== Roads ===
- Waseda-dori
- Sodai-dori
- Ground-zaka
- Suwa-dori
- Gaien-higashi-dori
- Shin-Mejiro-dori
- Natsume-zaka-dori
- Hakoneyama-dori

== Rivers ==
- Kanda River
- Kani River (underground)

== Major buildings and places ==
- Waseda University (Waseda campus, Toyama Campus, Kikui-cho Campus)
  - Ōkuma Garden
  - Okuma Auditorium
- Waseda University Junior and Senior High School
- Hotel Chinzanso Tokyo (formerly Rihga Royal Hotel Tokyo)
- Anahachiman-gu Shrine
- Toyama Park
- National Institute of Infectious Diseases
- Kansen-en Park
- Okuma Garden
- Tokyo Metropolitan Bureau of Transportation Waseda Bus Depot
- Sansho-an, Said to be the birthplace of curry udon and katsudon (closed on 31 July 2018)
- Kaihosha Headquarters
- Waseda Hoshien
- Abaco Bridal Hall
