= Nishi-Waseda =

Nishi-Waseda 西早稲田
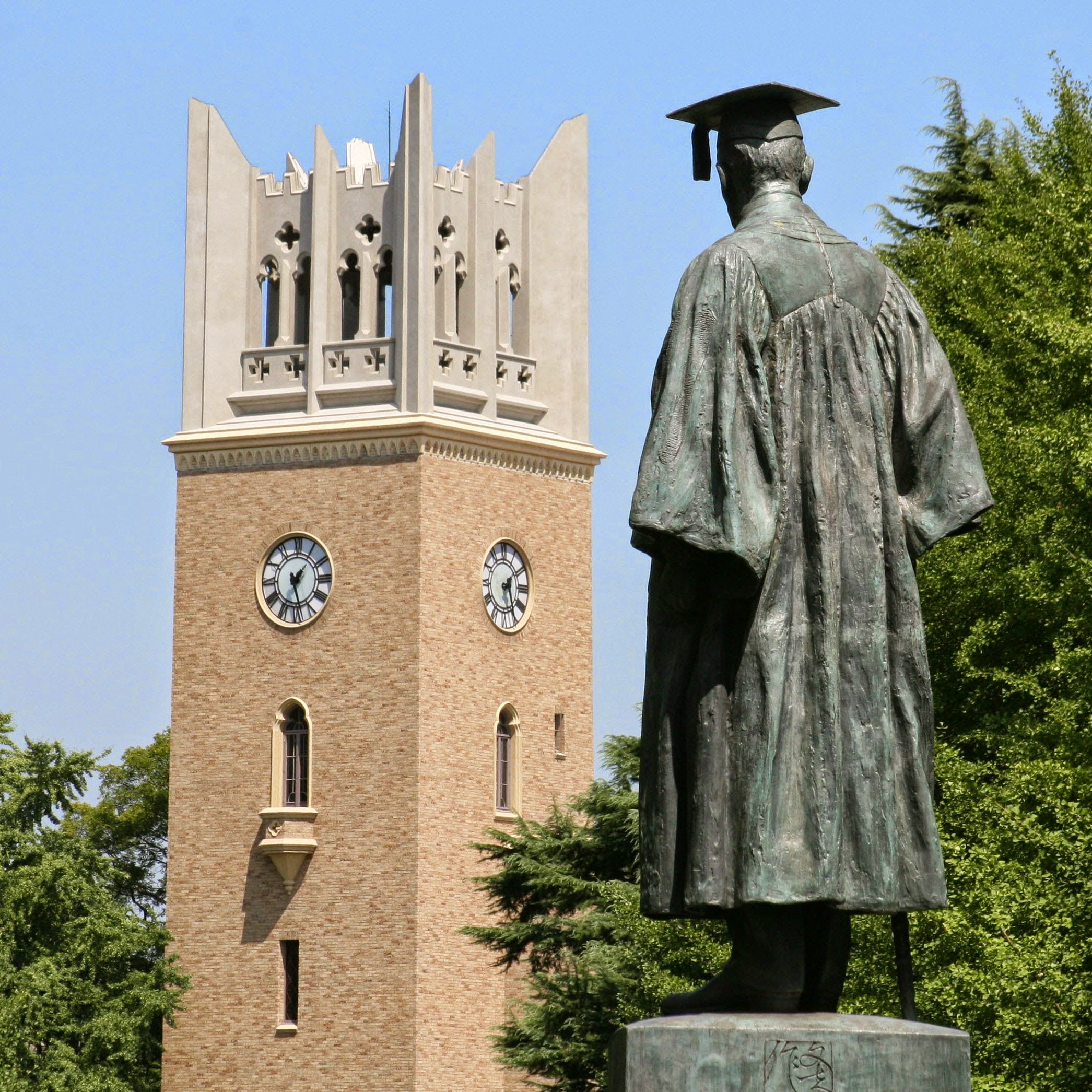
- Okuma Auditorium at Waseda University in February 2010
- Interactive map of Nishi-Waseda
- Country: Japan
- Prefecture: Tokyo
- Special ward: Shinjuku

Area
  - Land: 0.696446943 km^{2} (0.268899668 sq mi)

Population (2025)
  - Total: 18,950
- Postal codes: 162-0051 (2-chōme 1-1 to 1-23, 2-chōme 2); 169-0051 (Other areas)
- Area code: 03 (Tokyo Message Area)

Nishi-Waseda (Japanese: 西早稲田; lit. West Waseda) is a neighbourhood in Waseda, Shinjuku, comprising three chōme of Nishi-Waseda 1-chōme, 2-chōme, and 3-chōme.

== Geography ==
Nishi-Waseda is located in the northern part of Shinjuku Ward. The northern section of the district borders the Kanda River, which serves as the boundary with Takada in Toshima Ward; it also borders Sekiguchi in Bunkyo Ward to the northeast. To the east, it borders Totsuka-machi, and to the southeast, Babashita-machi (both in Shinjuku Ward). The southern boundary is Suwa-dori Avenue, separating it from Toyama in Shinjuku Ward, while the western boundary is Meiji-dori Avenue, separating it from Takadanobaba in Shinjuku Ward.

Shin-Mejiro-dori Avenue runs along the northern edge of the district near the Kanda River, while Waseda-dori Avenue traverses the central area. Grand-zaka-dori Avenue runs near Nishi-Waseda 1-chome, which is home to Waseda University's main campus (the Waseda Campus). Other facilities associated with the university are also found in the vicinity. Consequently, the area features establishments such as secondhand bookstores and eateries catering to students, giving it the atmosphere of a student district. In particular, a cluster of secondhand bookstores dealing in antiquarian and used books lines Waseda-dori Avenue; the scale of this book district is second only to Kanda-Jinbōchō within Tokyo. Several other universities and vocational schools are also located here, though the area is otherwise primarily residential.

As of 1 January 2025, land prices in the residential area stand at ¥840,000 per square metre at the location of 2-18-35 Nishi-Waseda and ¥1,250,000 per square meter at the location of 2-19-2 Nishi-Waseda.

== Population ==
On 1 March 2025 (announced by Shinjuku City), the number of households and the population are as follows:

| Subdistrict | Households | Population |
|---|---|---|
| 1-chōme | 3,940 | 5,752 |
| 2-chōme | 4,247 | 6,173 |
| 3-chōme | 4,491 | 7,025 |
| Total | 12,678 | 18,950 |

=== Population trends ===
Population trends
| Year | Population |
|---|---|
| 1995 | 14,552 |
| 2000 | 16,687 |
| 2005 | 17,134 |
| 2010 | 18,383 |
| 2015 | 18,391 |
| 2020 | 18,771 |

=== Household trends ===
Household trends
| Year | Number of households |
|---|---|
| 1995 | 7,551 |
| 2000 | 9,135 |
| 2005 | 9,928 |
| 2010 | 11,085 |
| 2015 | 11,490 |
| 2020 | 12,126 |

== Transport ==
=== Railway ===
| Stations within district | Nearby stations |
|---|---|
| Toden Arakawa Line (Tokyo Sakura Tram): SA29 Omokagebashi Station, 3-chōme; SA30 Waseda Station, 1-chōme | Fukutoshin Line: Nishi-waseda Station, 3-chōme; Yamanote Line Shinjuku Line Tōzai Line: JY15 SS02 Takadanobaba Station, 1-chōme; Tōzai Line: Waseda Station, 1-chōme |

- Waseda Station on the Tokyo Metro Tozai Line and the Waseda Station on the Toden Arakawa Line are located at separate sites and are 600 metres apart.
- Nishi-Waseda Station on the Tokyo Metro Fukutoshin Line opened on 14 June 2008, along Meiji-dori Avenue to the west; however, its actual location is in Toyama. It is also situated at a distance from the Toei Bus "Nishi-Waseda" stop near the Nishi-Waseda intersection.

=== Bus ===
Toei Bus has two depots in Nishi-Waseda, Waseda depot Otakibashi Depot, and operates routes in the in the surrounding area.

=== Road ===
- Tokyo Metropolitan Road / Saitama Prefectural Road Route 25 (Iidabashi-Shakujii-Niiza Line) — (Waseda-dori / Suwa-dori)
- Tokyo Metropolitan Road Route 433 (Kagurazaka-Koenji Line) — (Okubo-dori)
- Tokyo Metropolitan Road Route 305 (Shiba-Shinjuku-Oji Line) — (Meiji-dori)
- Hakoneyama-dori

== Businesses ==
The number of business establishments and employees according to the 2021 Economic Census is as follows.

| Subdistrict | Businesses | Employees |
|---|---|---|
| 1-chōme | 203 | 11,700 |
| 2-chōme | 258 | 3,736 |
| 2-chōme | 229 | 2,141 |
| Total | 690 | 17,577 |

=== Employee number trends ===
Employee number trends
| Year | Employee count |
|---|---|
| 2016 | 6,378 |
| 2021 | 17,577 |

== Places ==
- Waseda University Waseda campus
- Kansen-en Park
- Anahachiman-gu Shrine
- Hojo-ji Temple
- Mizu-Inari Shrine
- Nishi-Waseda Tenso Shrine
