= Moi Meng Ling =

Malaysian virologist

- Born: Kuala Lumpur
- Education: Universiti Putra Malaysia; University of Tsukuba; Graduate School of Comprehensive Human Sciences University of Tsukuba（Doctor of Medicine）
- Known for: Dengue and mosquito-borne viral diseases research
- Awards: Young Scientists' Prize, Commendation for Science and Technology by the Minister of Education, Culture, Sports, Science and Technology Sugiura Award, Japanese Society of Virology Japan Medical Research and Development Grand Prize, Agency for Medical Research and Development (AMED) President Prize（Ceremony at Prime Minister's Official Residence (Japan)） Others
- Scientific career
- Fields: Virology; Tropical medicine Infectious diseases
- Workplaces: WHO; National Institute of Infectious Diseases (Japan); The University of Tokyo; Institute of Tropical Medicine, Nagasaki University
- Doctoral advisor: Ichiro Kurane

Chinese name
- Traditional Chinese: 梅敏苓
- Simplified Chinese: 梅敏苓
- Hanyu Pinyin: Méi Mǐnlíng
- Pha̍k-fa-sṳ: Mòi Mên-lìn
- Jyutping: Mui4 Man5 Ling4
- Hokkien POJ: Mûi Bín-lêng
- Tâi-lô: Muî Bín-lîng

Sherry Moi Meng Ling is a Malaysian virologist, currently serving as a professor at the Graduate School of Medicine, The University of Tokyo. Her research focuses on innate immune system to mosquito-borne virus infection and field epidemiology.

She is the proposer of the "iPREP-Flavivirus Initiative"—an international framework for flavivirus research launched on January 20, 2026, which brought together 102 participants from 48 organizations, including national institutes, universities, and medical institutions, across 15 countries and regions in Asia, Oceania, the Middle East, Europe, and North America. * iPREP : Immunology for Pandemic Readiness and Evaluation Platform

She has previously worked as a researcher at the National Institute of Infectious Diseases (Japan). She received her B.Sc. (Hon) at University Putra Malaysia, M.Sc. (Medical Sciences) and Ph.D. (Medical Sciences) at Graduate School of Comprehensive Human Sciences, University of Tsukuba.

She speaks Malay, English, Chinese (Mandarin and Cantonese), and Japanese.

== Career ==
Moi was born in Kuala Lumpur, Malaysia. After graduating from SMK Convent Bukit Nanas, she received her B.Sc. degree at Universiti Putra Malaysia in 2002 with first class honors. Upon receiving a full scholarship offered by the Ministry of Education, Culture, Sports, Science and Technology (MEXT), Japan, she furthered her graduate studies in Japan.

Having been affected by dengue fever herself, she was inspired to pursue her Ph.D. degree on the immune response to Dengue virus. After receiving her Ph.D. degree from University of Tsukuba in 2010, she continued to pursue her research on dengue as a researcher at the National Institute of Infectious Diseases, Japan, from 2010 to 2014. She was part of the research team which was involved in laboratory diagnosis and epidemiological characterization of the first dengue outbreak in Japan for the past 70 years.

In 2015, she won the MEXT Young Scientist Award for her research on the ADE mechanisms during dengue virus infection, and specifically, for pioneering in vitro assays to study immune response during viral infection. She was the only Malaysian who has received the MEXT Young Scientist Award in recent years.

In 2018, she was awarded the Sugiura Award by the Japanese Society of Virology and, Female Researcher Award by the Japanese Society of Tropical Medicine, for her pioneering research on developing in vitro and animal models for dengue virus infection and field epidemiology.

Between 2016 and 2018, she organized and conducted programs with the World Health Organization (WHO) and led field epidemiological studies with collaborators in Vietnam, which was key in understanding the extent of Zika epidemic in the region. The findings led to important feedback to WHO and local health authorities for the developing control measures. In recognition of her work, she was awarded the Japan Medical Research and Development Grand Prize (AMED President Prize), in the presence of Prime Minister of Japan Yoshihide Suga, for her epidemiological work and research on immunity against mosquito-borne viral diseases in 2020. She was the first foreigner in Japan to receive the award.

Moi was an associate professor at the Institute for Tropical Medicine, Nagasaki University between 2015 and 2020. She became a full professor in 2020, and remains at the same institute, and continues to work on molecular and epidemiological aspects of emerging and re-emerging viral diseases and the development of vaccines and therapeutics.

She has served as the deputy director, WHO Collaboration Center for Research & Reference of Tropical Viral Diseases. As a technical expert in the WHO Reference Laboratories Providing Confirmatory Testing for COVID-19 network, she also contributes to developing laboratory guidelines for COVID-19 diagnosis. She is currently a professor at School of International Health, the University of Tokyo.

== List of awards and honors ==
- Dean's Award for Excellent Research, Graduate School of Comprehensive Human Sciences, University of Tsukuba (2010)
- Best Poster Award, Malaysia-Japan Academic Conference (2013)
- Best Talk Award, Science Cafe, National Institute of Infectious Diseases, Japan (2014)
- Ishibashi Lecture, International Medical Society of Japan (2014)
- International Travel Award, Kato Memorial Bioscience Foundation (2014)
- Grants for Female Researchers, MSD Life Science Foundation (2015)
- Young Scientists' Prize, Commendation for Science and Technology by the Minister of Education, Culture, Sports, Science and Technology (a first for Nagasaki University）(2016)
- Best Research Award, Grants for Female Researchers, MSD Life Science Foundation (a first for Nagasaki University, first foreigner to receive the award）(2016)
- Best Paper Award, Doumonkai, Institute of Tropical Medicine, Nagasaki University (2018)
- Female Researcher Award, Nagasaki University (2018)
- Sugiura Award, Japanese Society of Virology (a first for Nagasaki University, first foreigner to receive the award）(2018)
- Female Researcher Award, Japanese Society of Tropical Medicine (2019)
- Japan Medical Research and Development Grand Prize, Japan Agency for Medical Research and Development(AMED) President Prize (a first for Nagasaki University, first foreigner to receive the award）(2020)
