= Fujita Kankō =

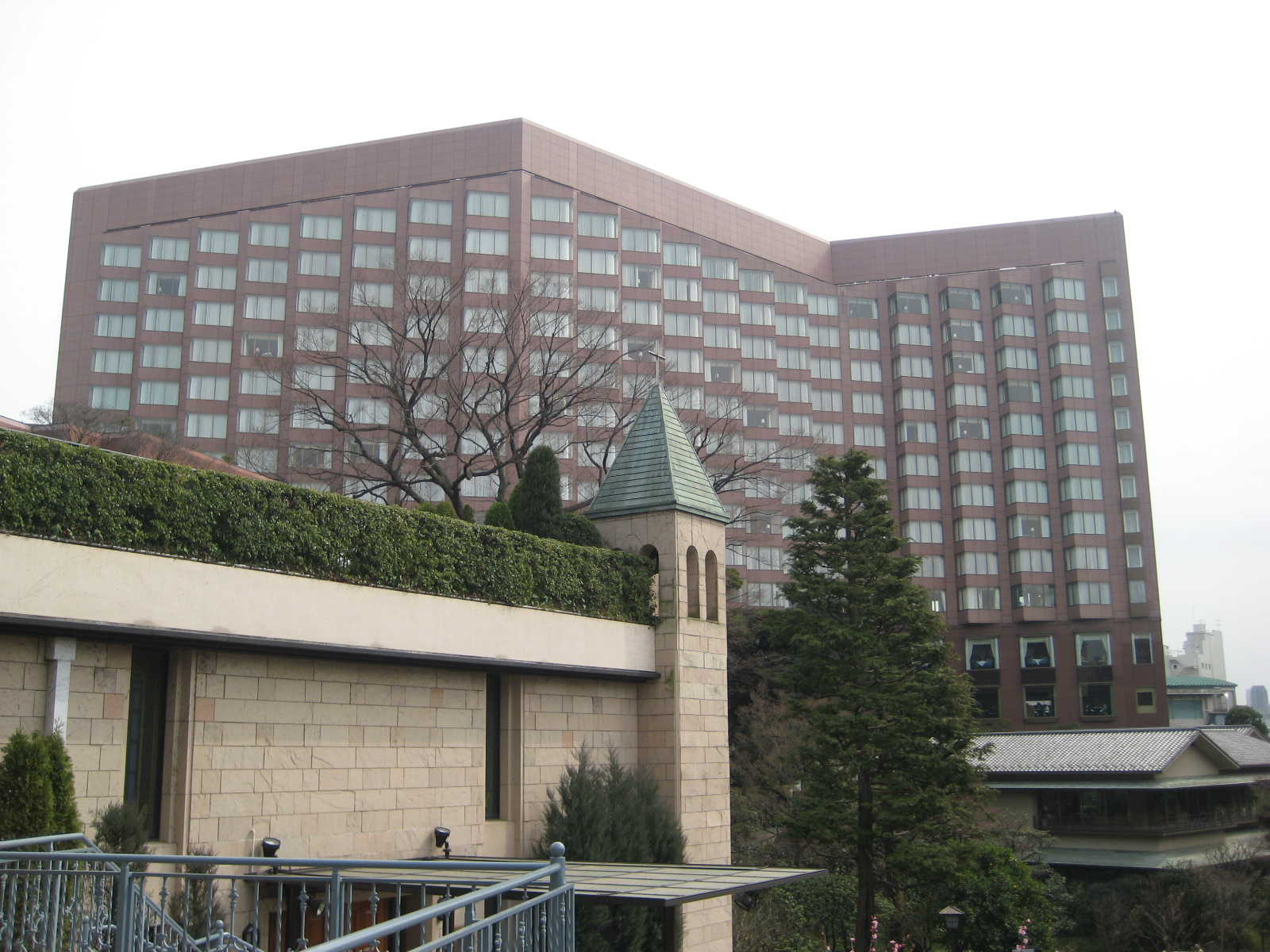
Hotel Chinzanso in Tokyo

Fujita Kankō (Japanese: 藤田観光) is one of the leading companies in the hospitality industry in Japan, and operates such prominent hotels as the Hotel Chinzanso in Tokyo and Kowaku-en (小涌園) in Hakone, and owns the WHG Hotels (WHGホテルズ) in major cities of Japan.

== In General ==
Fujita Kankō was established in 1955 as a spin-off from Fujita Kōgyō (Japanese: 藤田興業) of Fujita zaibatsu. It operates the Taiko-en (太閤園) in Osaka and the Hotel Chinzanso in Tokyo with Chinzan-sō Garden in Tokyo, which are used for wedding banquets as well as hotels. It also owns the Kowaku-en Hotels (小涌園) in Hakone and other cities.

Since 1973, the company has opened 30 Washington Hotels (ワシントンホテルズ) in the major cities in Japan. It also operates an aquarium (下田海中水族館) in Shimoda, Shizuoka.

As of October 2004, the company's business is 38 percent from the Washington Hotels, 17 percent from wedding business, 10 percent from the Hotel Chinzanso Tokyo and the rest from other businesses.

Fujita Kankō has been listed on the First Floor of the Tokyo Stock Exchange since 1964. It is the largest shareholder of Tōkai Kisen.

== Gallery ==
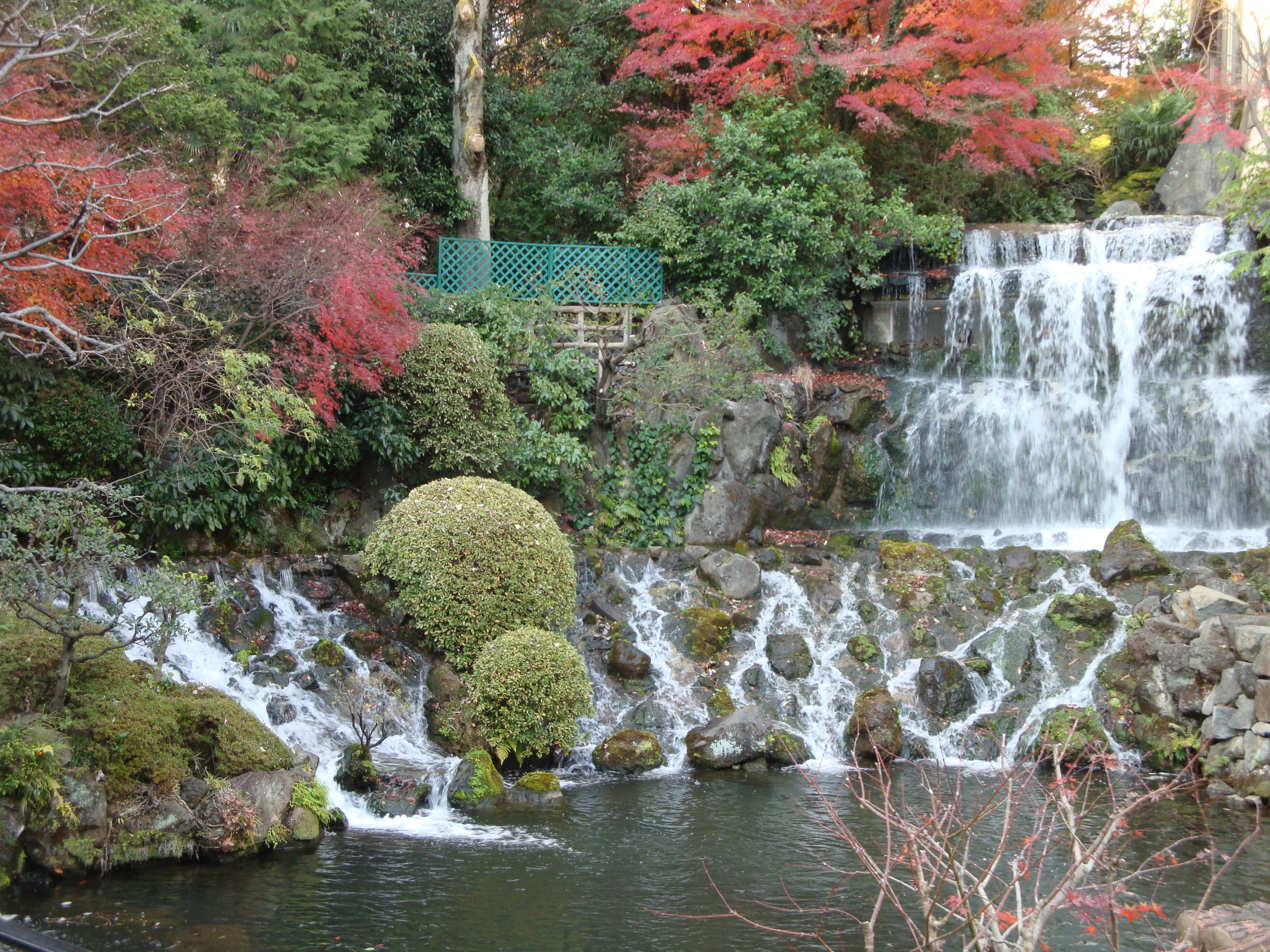
Chinzan-so garden, Tokyo

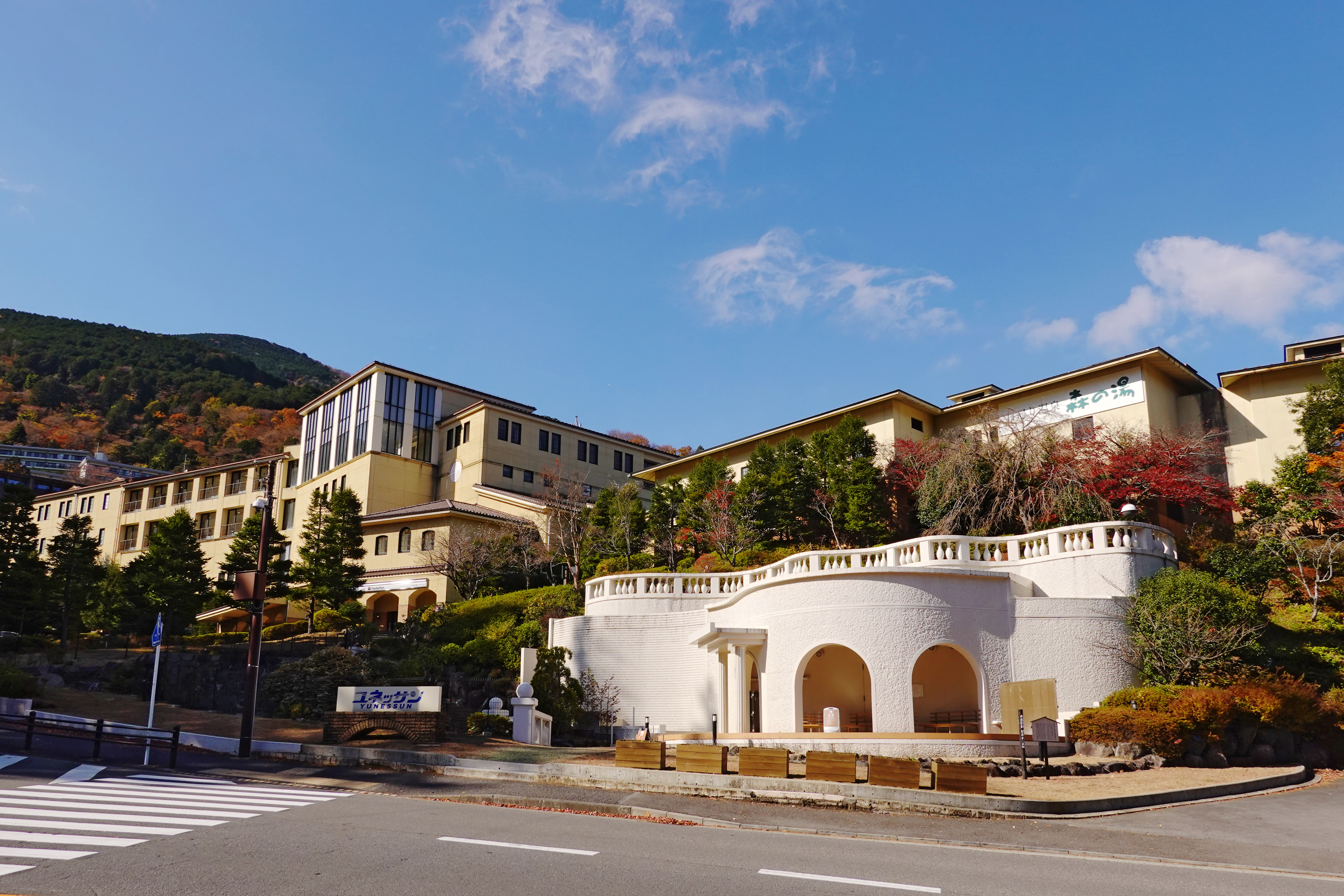
Kowaki-en/Yunessun, Hakone

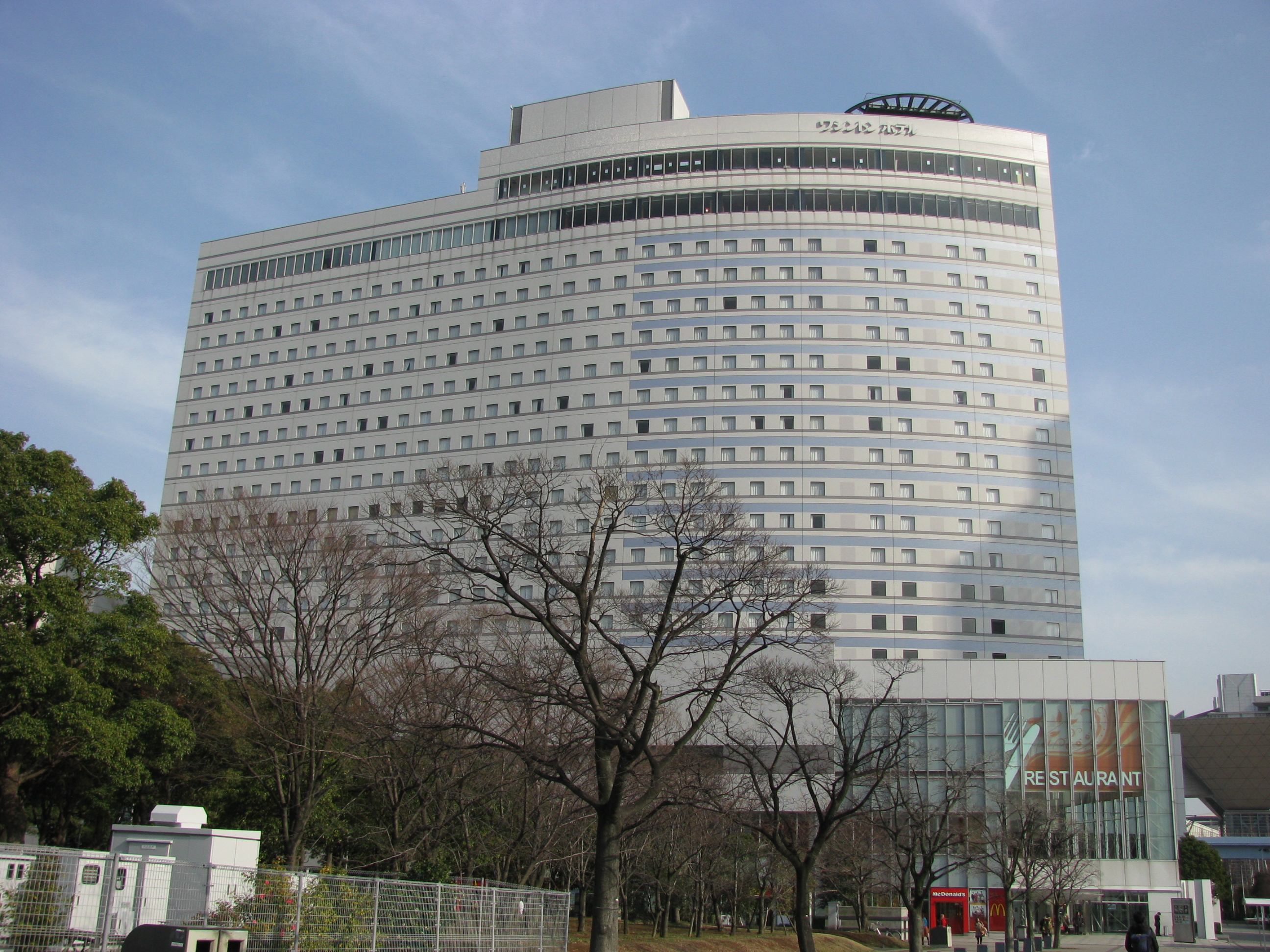
Washington Hotel, Tokyo Bay Ariake

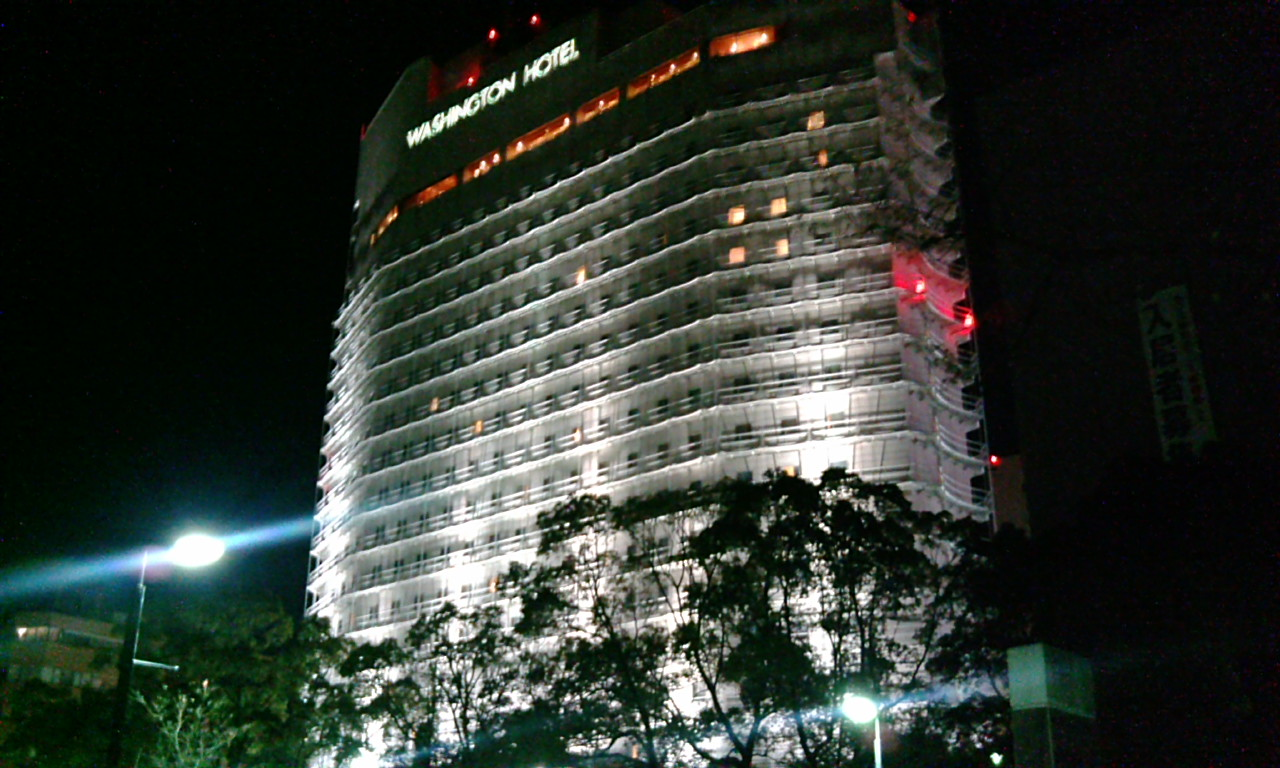
Washington Hotel, Isezakichō, Yokohama
