= Gakushūinshita Station =

Tram station in Tokyo, Japan

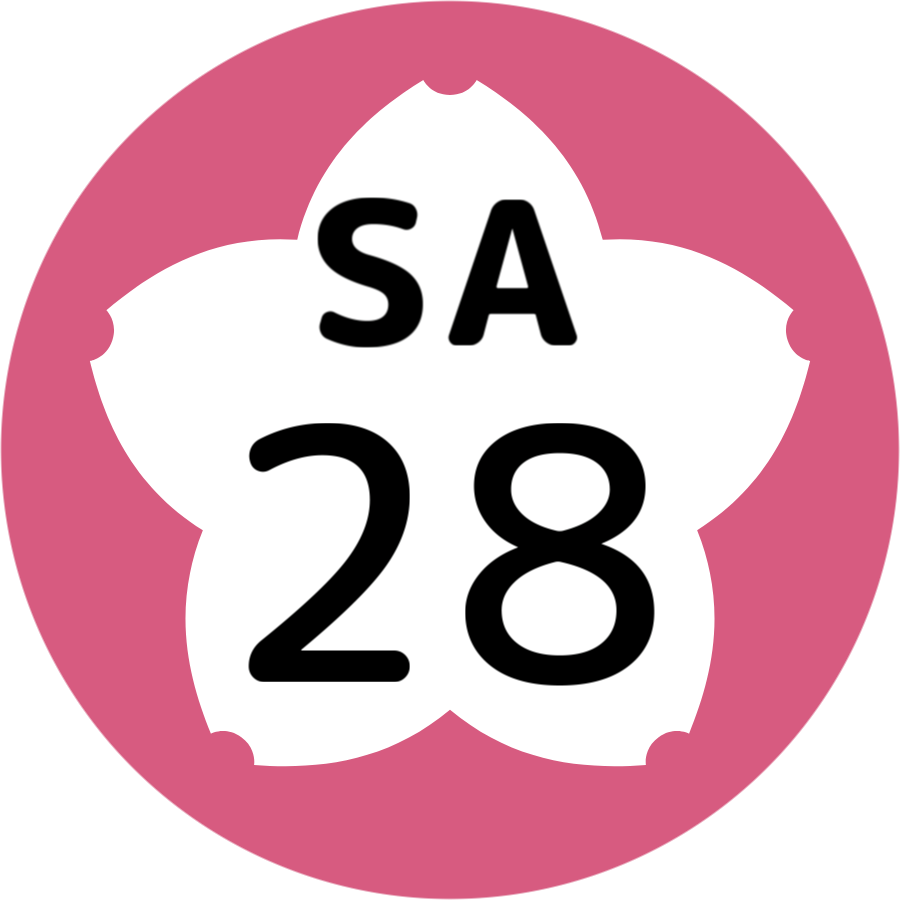
Gakushūinshita Station 学習院下停留場

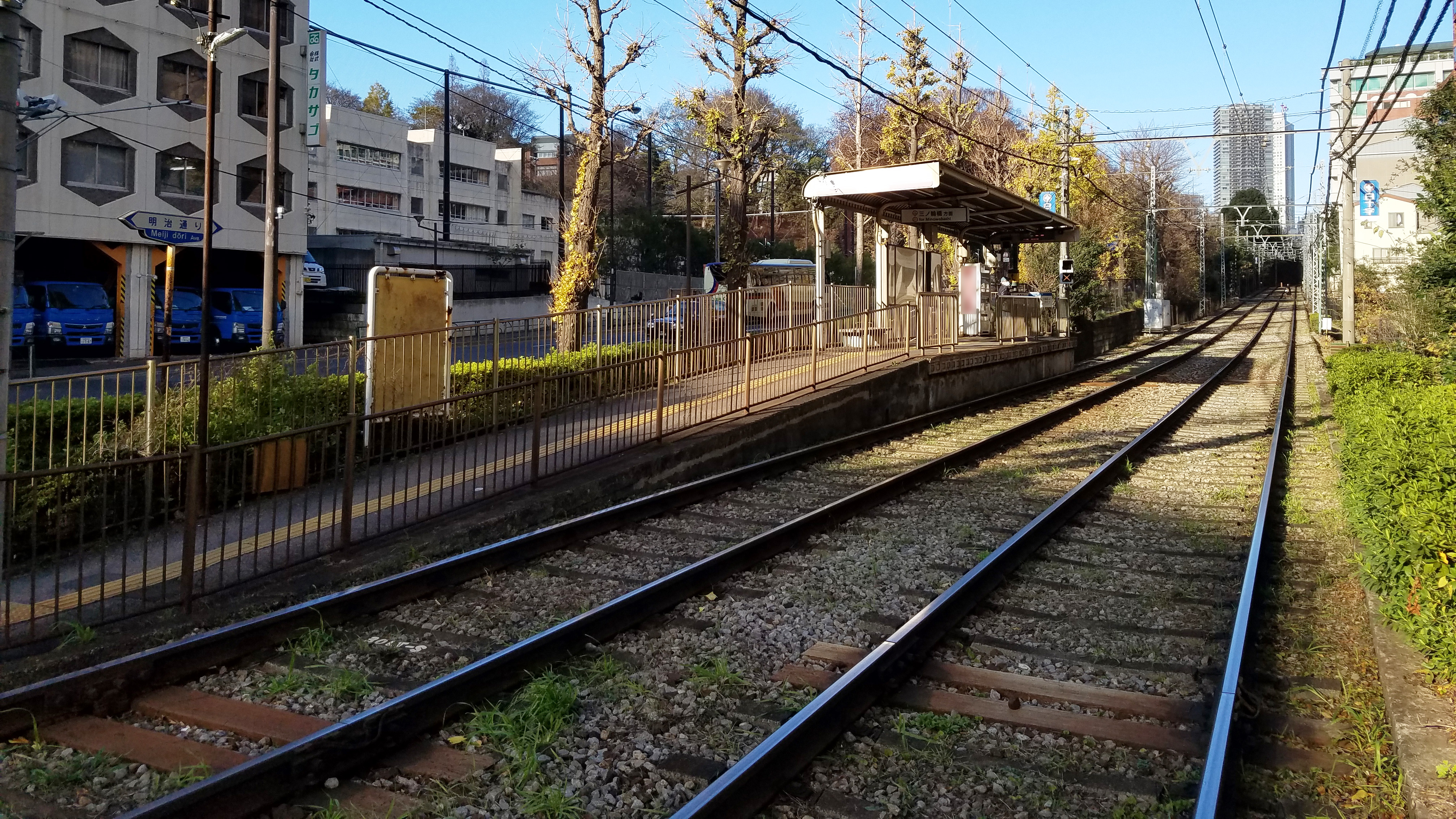
- The Minowabashi-bound platform in December 2018

General information
- Location: 2-chome Takada, Toshima Ward, Tokyo; Japan
- Coordinates: 35°43′00″N 139°42′45″E
- Operator: Toei
- Line: Toden Arakawa Line
- Platforms: 2 side platforms
- Tracks: 2

Construction
- Structure type: At grade

Other information
- Station code: SA28

History
- Opened: 25 December 1914; 111 years ago

Services
Preceding station	Toei	Following station
Omokagebashi towards Waseda	Toden Arakawa Line	Kishibojimmae towards Minowabashi
Location
- Location within Special wards of Tokyo Location within Tokyo Bay and Bōsō Peninsula Location within Tokyo Location within Japan

Gakushūinshita Station (学習院下停留場, Gakushūinshita-teiryūjō) is a station of Tokyo Sakura Tram.

== Lines ==
Gakushūinshita Station is served by Tokyo Sakura Tram.
