= Fujita (company) =

Japanese conglomerate

Fujita (藤田) is a Japanese conglomerate based in Osaka.

== History ==
Fujita was founded by Densaburo Fujita, who created a zaibatsu (pre-war conglomerate) by producing military goods during the Satsuma Rebellion and rapidly expanded his business to construction, mining, and other businesses.

After World War II, the Allied Occupation authorities broke up the zaibatsu conglomerates. Many of the assets of the Fujita zaibatsu were placed in the custody of Fujita Kankō, a resort development company. This has since become the central body of the Fuhita keiretsu (post-war conglomerate).

The construction of the third terminal of Shahjalal International Airport of Dhaka will be carried out by Aviation Dhaka Consortium (ADC), consisting of Mitsubishi Corporation, Samsung C&T Corporation and Fujita. The total cost of the project is ৳213 billion (US$1.8 billion).
