= Chinzan-sō Garden =

Japanese garden in Bunkyō, Tokyo

- 椿山荘
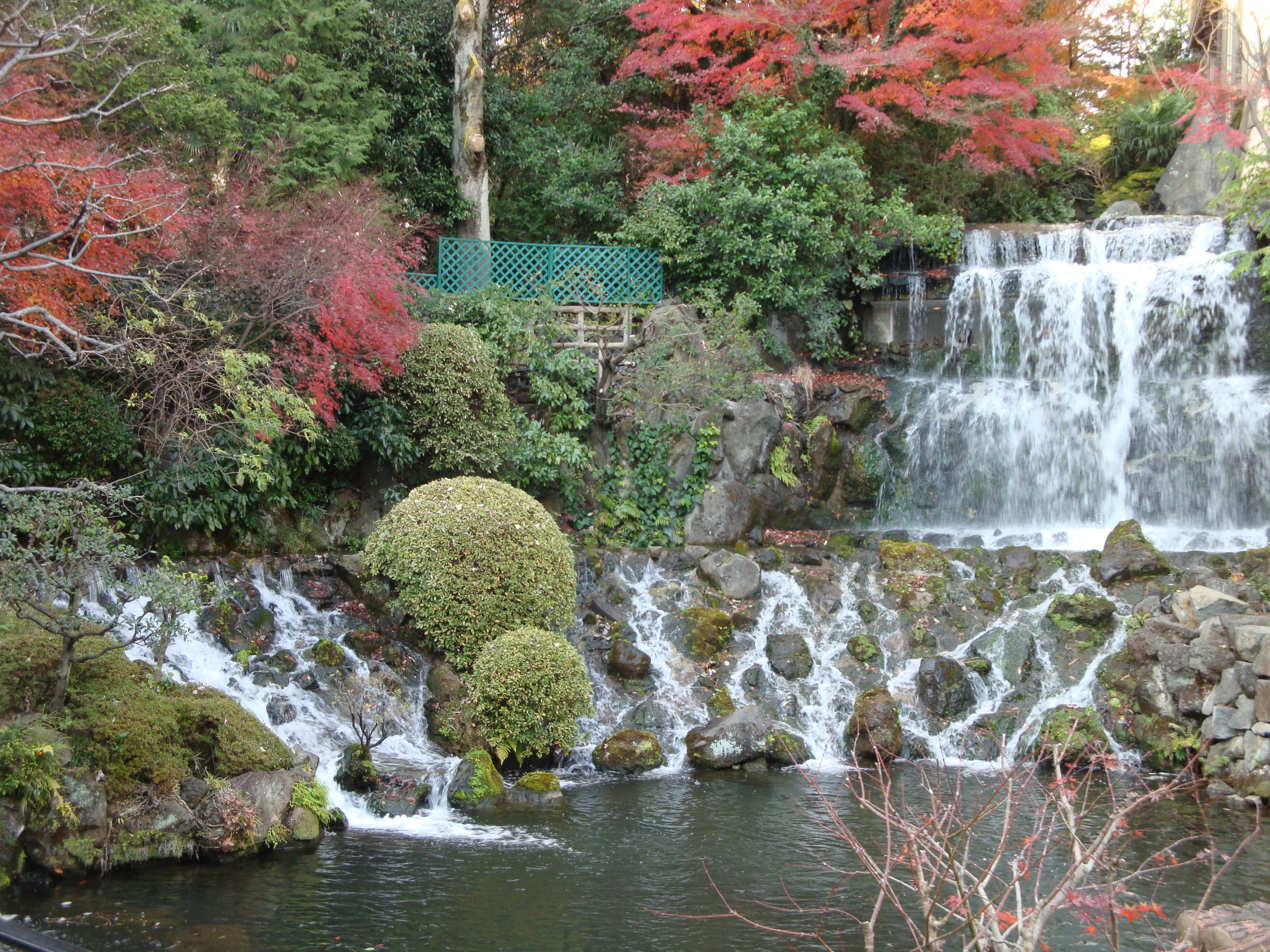
- Waterfall in the garden
- Interactive map of Chinzan-sō Garden
- Type: Japanese garden
- Location: Bunkyō, Tokyo, Japan
- Coordinates: 35°42′44″N 139°43′32″E
- Created: 1877

Chinzan-sō Garden (椿山荘) is a Japanese garden located in Bunkyō, Tokyo. Founded in 1877, the garden is rich in historic remains and artifacts. The garden is part of the Hotel Chinzanso Tokyo property and can be accessed by walking from Edogawabashi Station.

== History ==
In the 1600s, Matsuo Bashō, a renowned haiku poet of the Edo period, lived in a hut overlooking this property for four years. In the Meiji period the estate owner and well-known statesman Prince Aritomo Yamagata built his mansion here and named it "Chinzan-so" or "House of Camellia" after the numerous camellia flowers that blossomed here; he made use of the undulating topography of the mansion grounds to its best advantage. The Prince hosted many important political meetings here. Records say that the Emperor Meiji held a number of important conferences with his high-ranking dignitaries at the "House of Camellia".

== Historical Artifacts ==
When the property passed on to Baron Heitaro Fujita, he decorated the grounds with historical monuments from all over Japan, especially Kyoto and Toba. A thousand-year-old pagoda was transferred here from the Hiroshima mountains. This three-story pagoda was built by the Chikurin-ji temple monks without using a single nail. The Shiratama Inari Shrine in the center of the garden was removed from the grounds of Shimogamo in Kyoto in 1924. Other cultural treasures scattered throughout the site include carved Taoist and Buddhist images and over thirty stone lanterns. A large pond, waterfall, and natural spring are also part of the garden, as is a 500-year-old sacred tree that measures 4.5 m around its base.

== Gallery ==
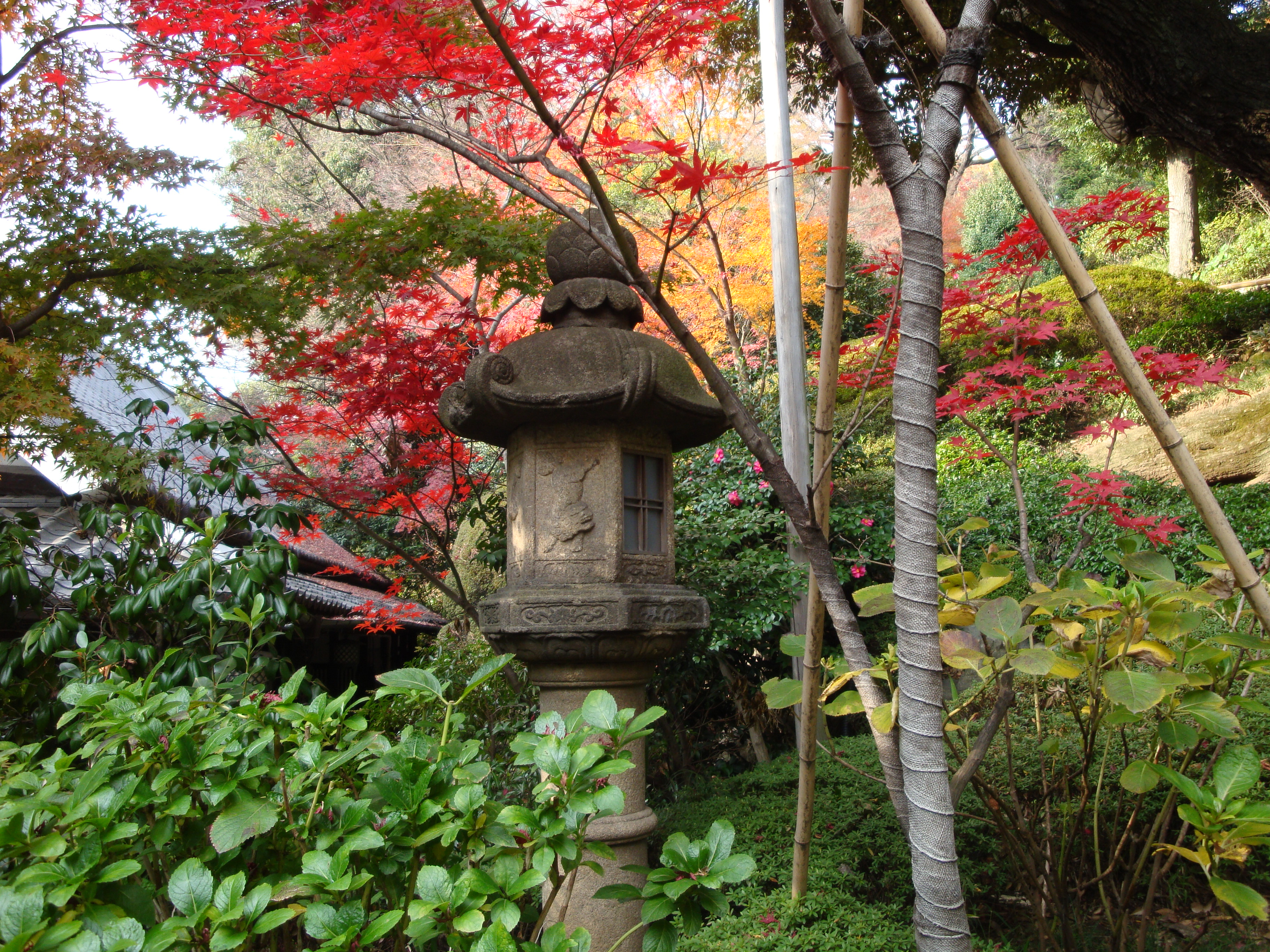
A stone lantern

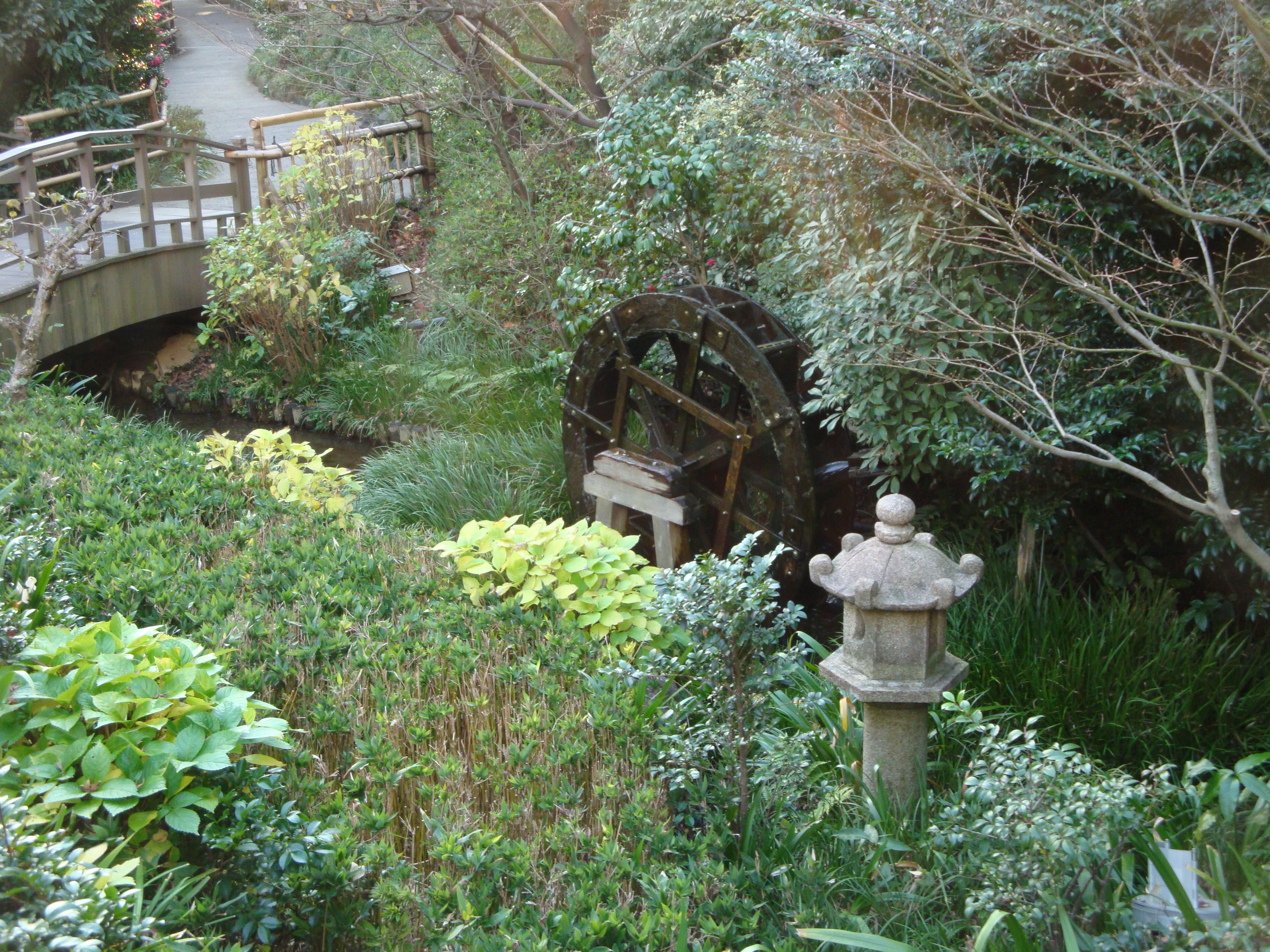
A watermill

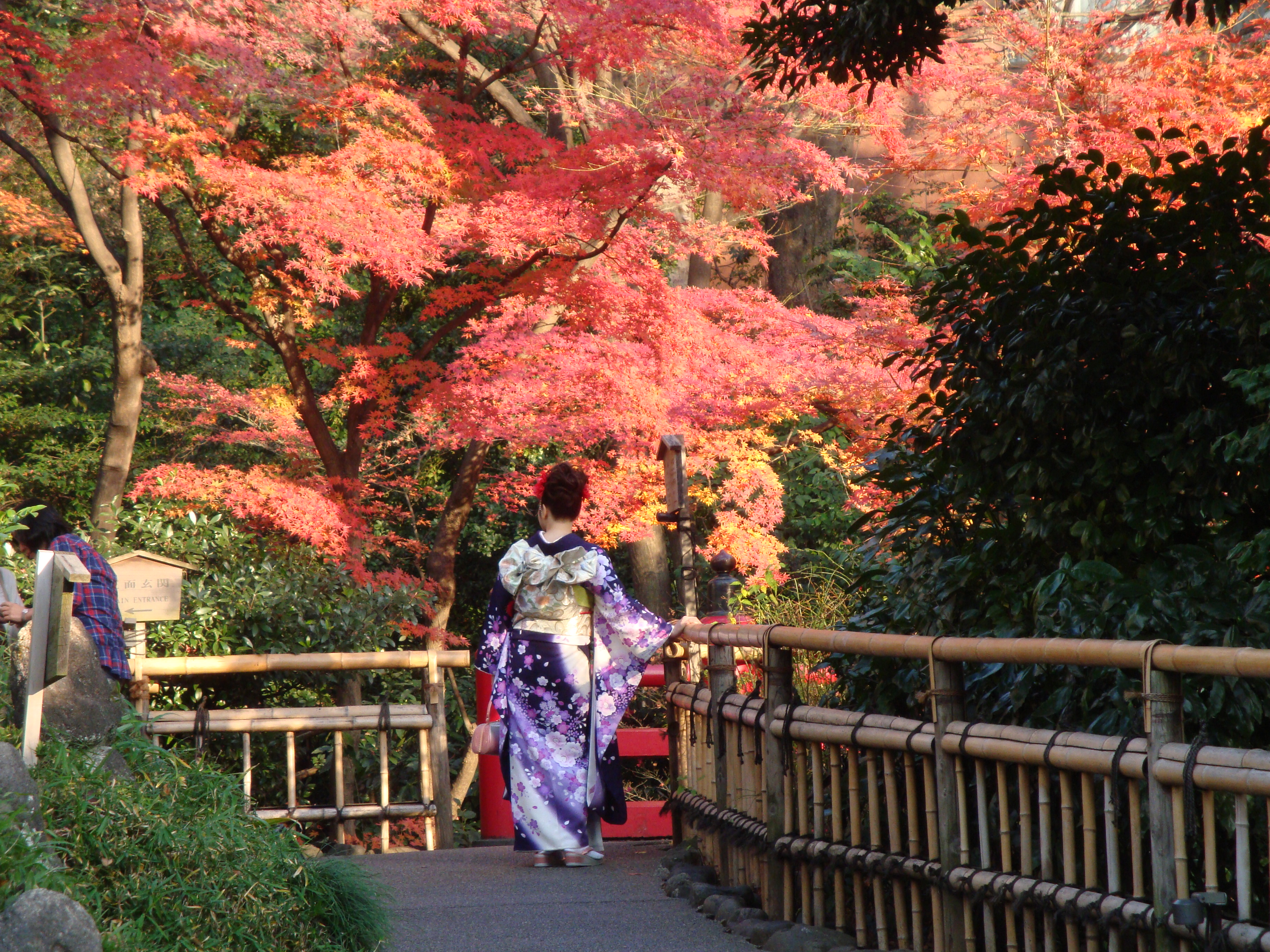
A bridge

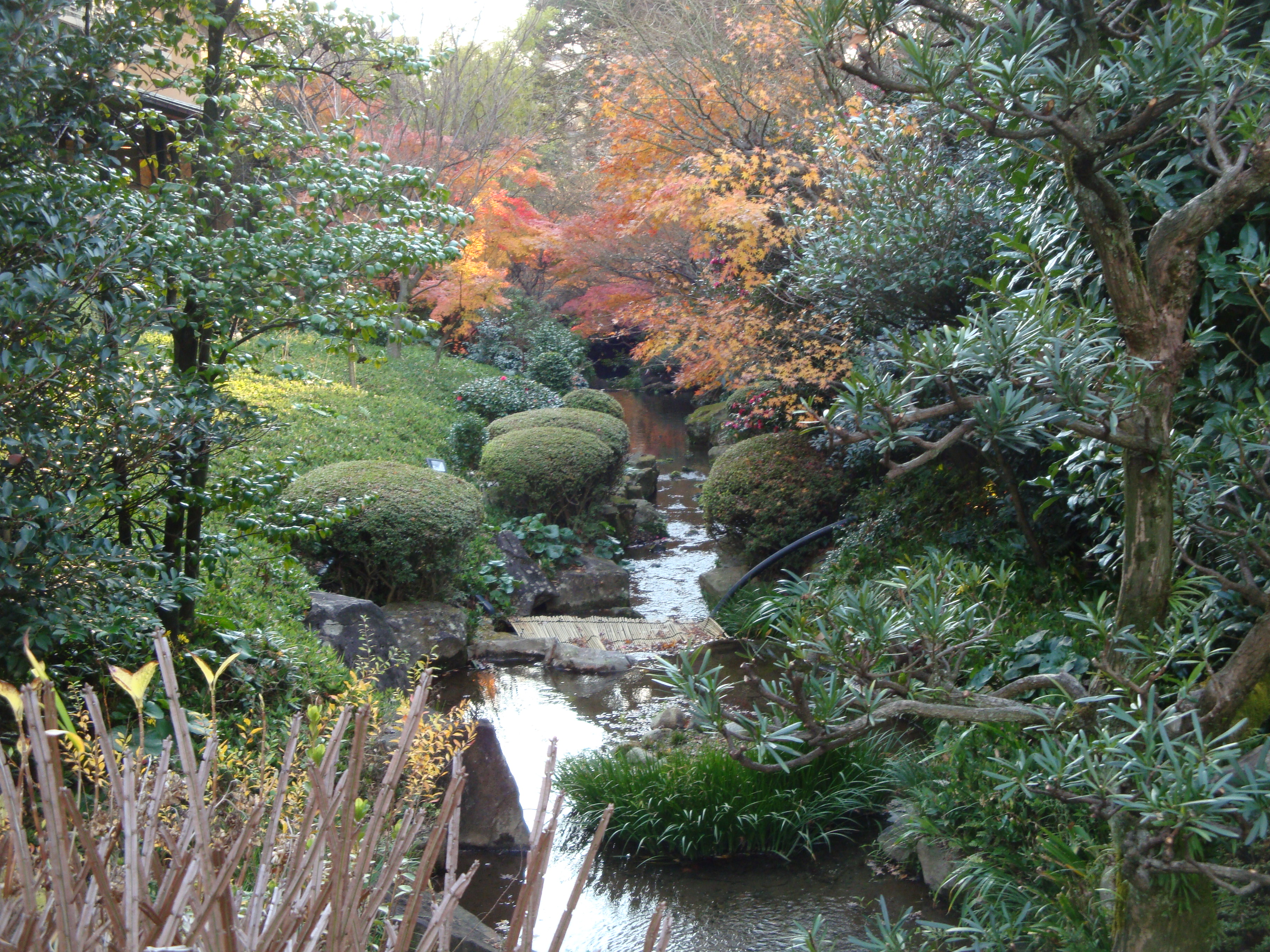
Hotaru-sawa stream

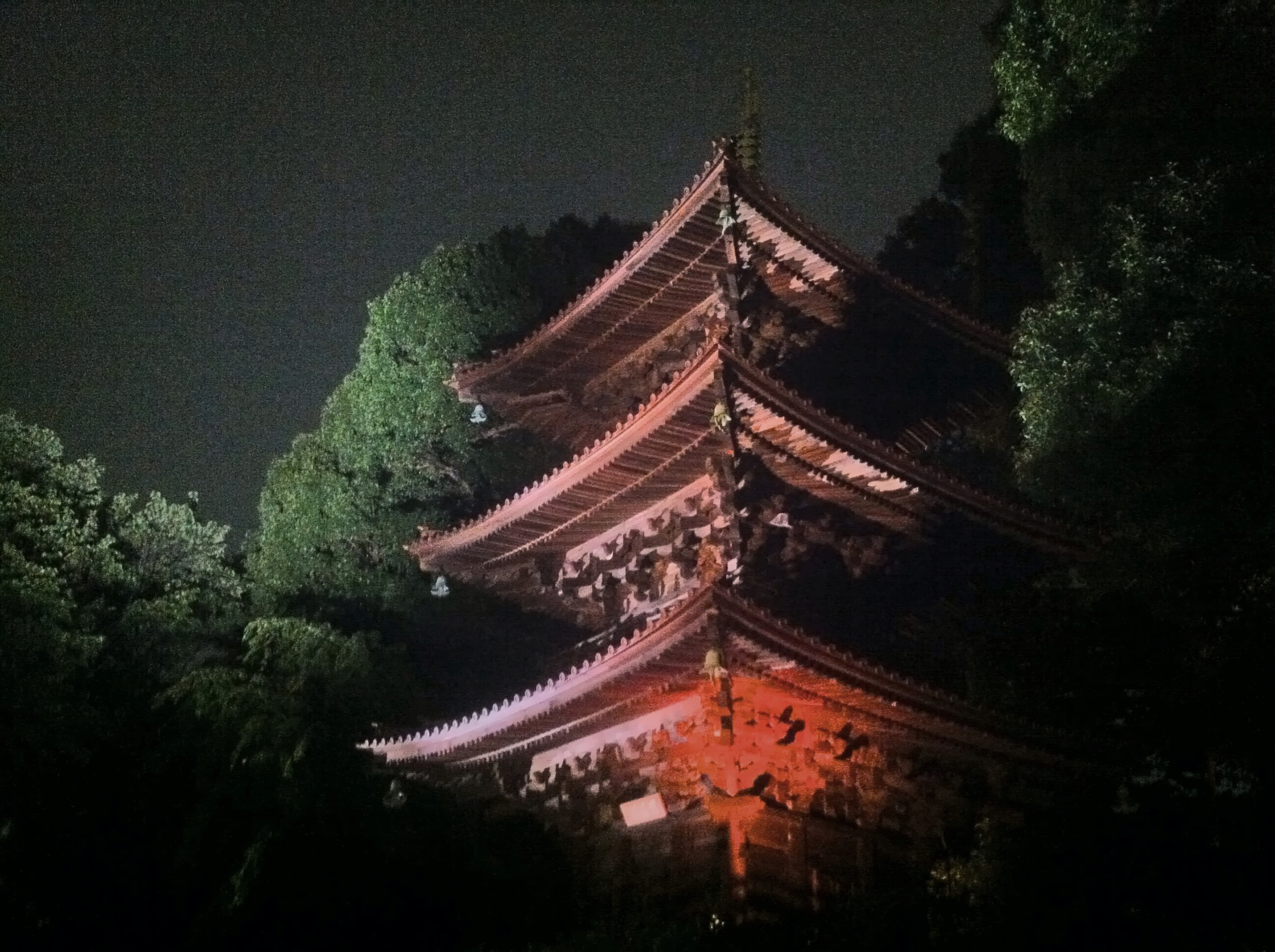
Pagoda at night
