= Japan Agency for Medical Research and Development =

Japanese medical research organization

Coordinates: 35.6872°N 139.7644°E

Japan Agency for Medical Research and Development (AMED)
Agency overview
- Formed: 2015
- Headquarters: Tokyo, Japan
- Employees: about 370
- Annual budget: 126.6 billion Yen (FY2018)
- President: Makoto Suematsu, M.D., Ph.D.
- Parent Agency: Office of Healthcare Policy, Cabinet Secretariat Ministry of Education, Culture, Sports, Science Technology Ministry of Health, Labor and Welfare Ministry of Economy, Trade and Industry
- Website: https://www.amed.go.jp/

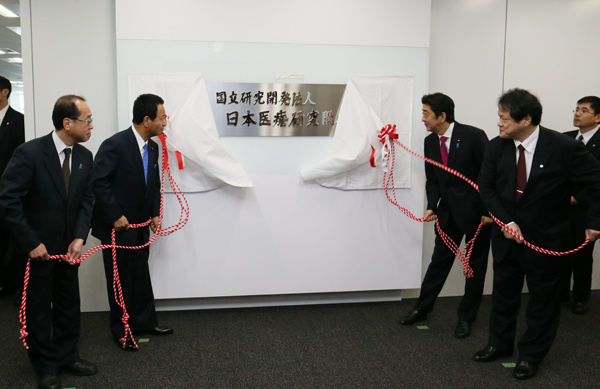
Japan Agency for Medical Research and Development

The Japan Agency for Medical Research and Development (AMED; Japanese: 日本医療研究開発機構), created in April 2015, is an independent Japanese medical research and development organization, overseen by the Office of Healthcare Policy of Cabinet Secretariat, the Ministry of Education, Culture, Sports, Science and Technology (MEXT), the Ministry of Health, Labor and Welfare (MHLW) and the Ministry of Economy, Trade and Industry (METI).

AMED has a headquarters in the Chiyoda City district of Tokyo and international offices in London, Singapore, and Washington D.C.
