= National Institute of Infectious Diseases (Japan) =

Governmental research institute in Japan

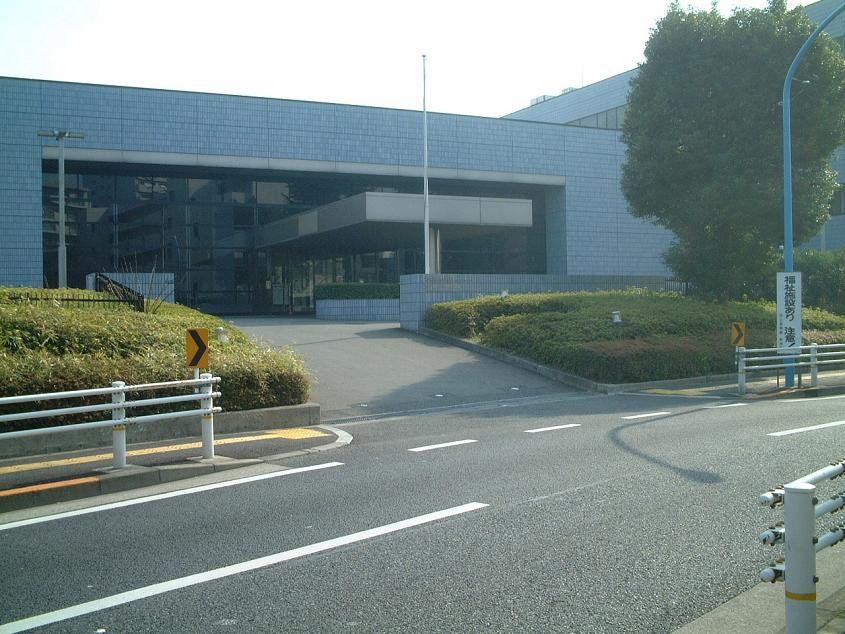
- Founded: 1947
- Location: Toyama, Shinjuku, Tokyo
- Website: https://www.niid.go.jp/niid/en/

The National Institute of Infectious Diseases (Japanese: 国立感染症研究所, Hepburn: Kokuritsukansenshōkenkyūjo) is an institution of the Ministry of Health, Labour and Welfare. Its predecessor is the National Institute of Health (Japanese: 国立予防衛生研究所, Hepburn: Kokuritsu yobōeiseikenkyūsho), which was established in 1947.

== History ==
The Murayama Government Building and RIKEN Tsukuba Research Institute are biosafety level (BSL) 4 research facilities, but both facilities are operated up to BSL-3 due to opposition from local residents, and research that requires BSL-4 can be performed.

On August 7, 2015, it was designated as the first BSL-4 facility in Japan for detailed examination and development of therapeutic agents for patients suspected of being infected with Ebola due to the 2014 West African Ebola epidemic.

On May 31, 2023, a law was passed in the Diet to establish the national research institute for health risk management by integrating the National Institute of Infectious Diseases (NIID) and the National Center for Global Health and Medicine (NCGM).
