= Omokagebashi Station =

Tram station in Tokyo, Japan

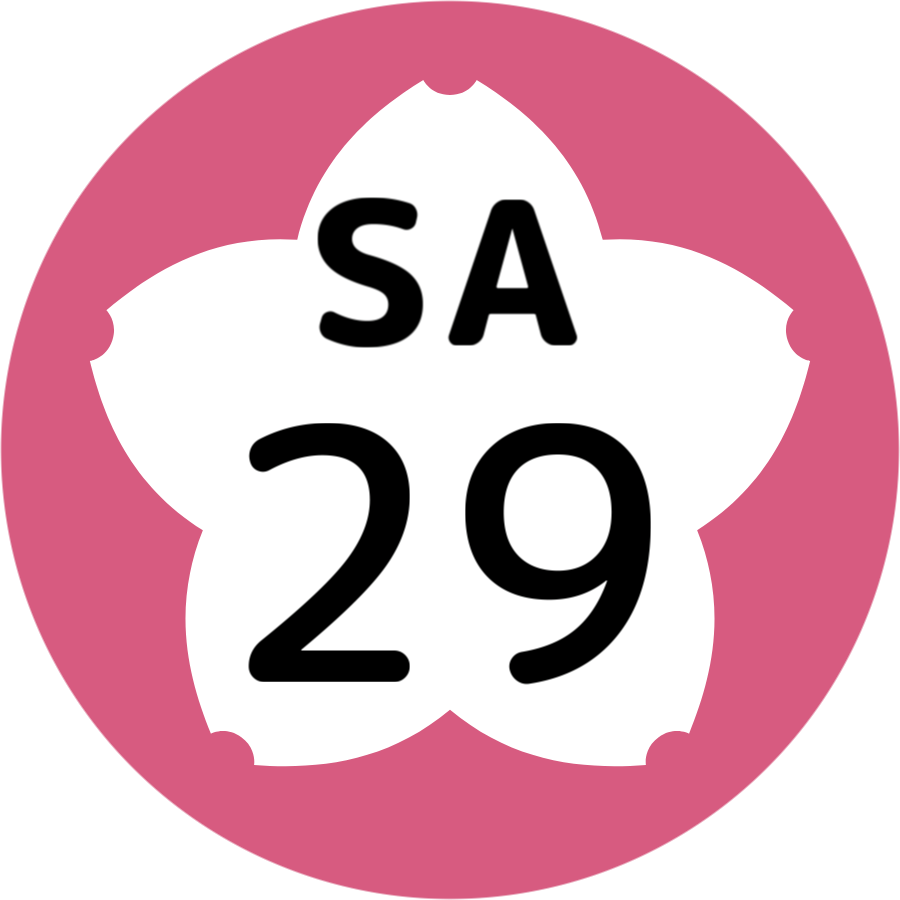
Omokagebashi Station 面影橋停留場

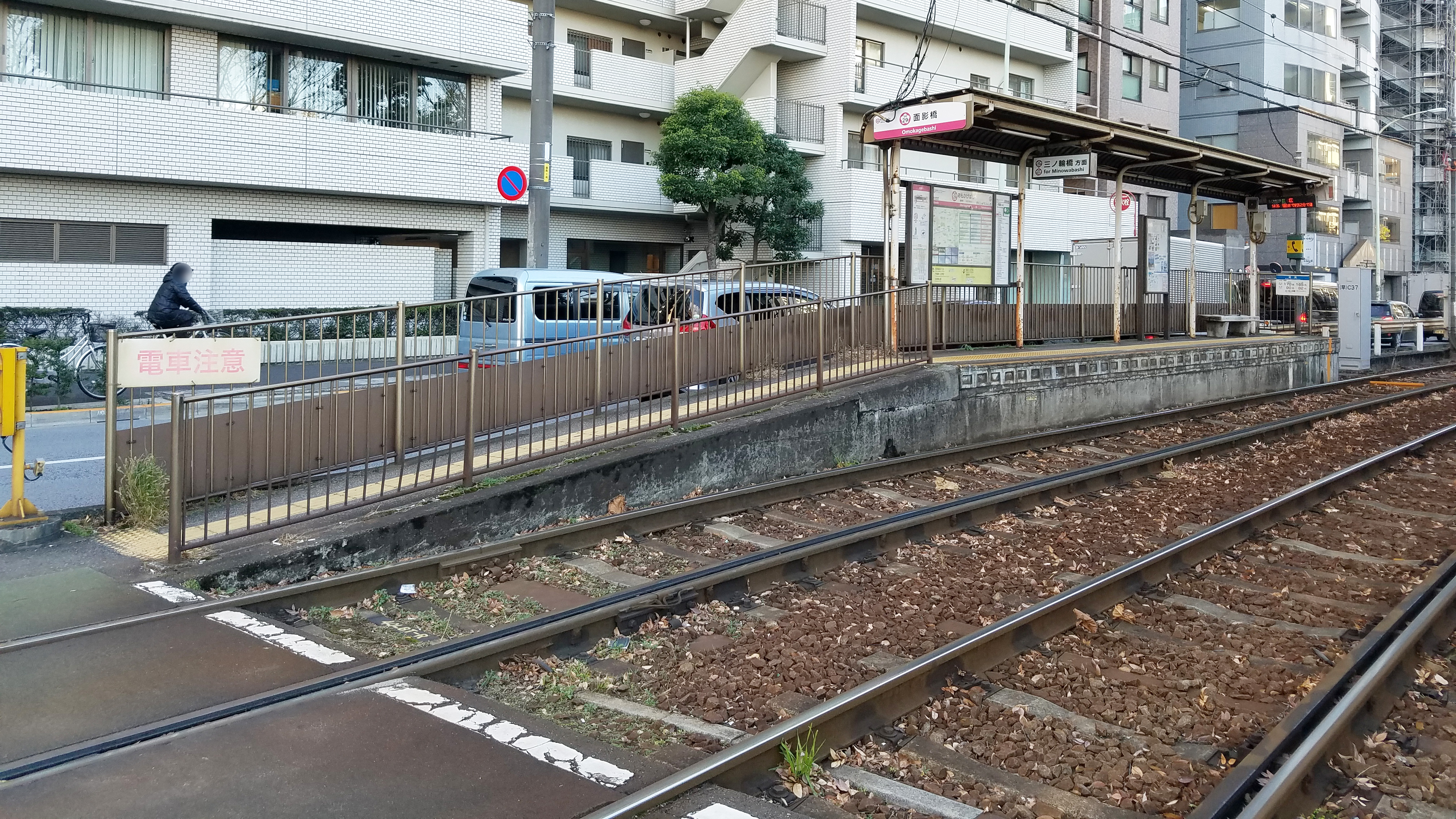
- The Minowabashi-bound platform in December 2018

General information
- Location: Nishi- Waseda 3-chome, Shinjuku Ward, Tokyo （東京都新宿区） Japan
- Coordinates: 35°42′46.5″N 139°42′52.3″E
- Operator: Toei
- Line: Toden Arakawa Line
- Platforms: 2 side platforms
- Tracks: 2

Construction
- Structure type: At grade

Other information
- Station code: SA29

History
- Opened: 30 March 1930; 96 years ago

Services
Preceding station	Toei	Following station
Waseda Terminus	Toden Arakawa Line	Gakushuinshita towards Minowabashi
Location
- Location within Special wards of Tokyo Location within Tokyo Bay and Bōsō Peninsula Location within Tokyo Location within Japan

Omokagebashi Station (面影橋停留場, Omokagebashi-teiryūjō) is a tram station operated by Tokyo Metropolitan Bureau of Transportation's Tokyo Sakura Tram located in Shinjuku, Tokyo Japan. It is 11.7 kilometres from the terminus of the Tokyo Sakura Tram at Minowabashi Station.

== Layout ==
Omokagebashi Station has two opposed side platforms.

== Surrounding area ==
- Kanda River

== History ==
Omokagebashi Station opened on 30 March 1930.
