= Hotel Chinzanso Tokyo =

Hotel in Bunkyo, Tokyo, Japan

Coordinates: 35.7111°N 139.7269°E

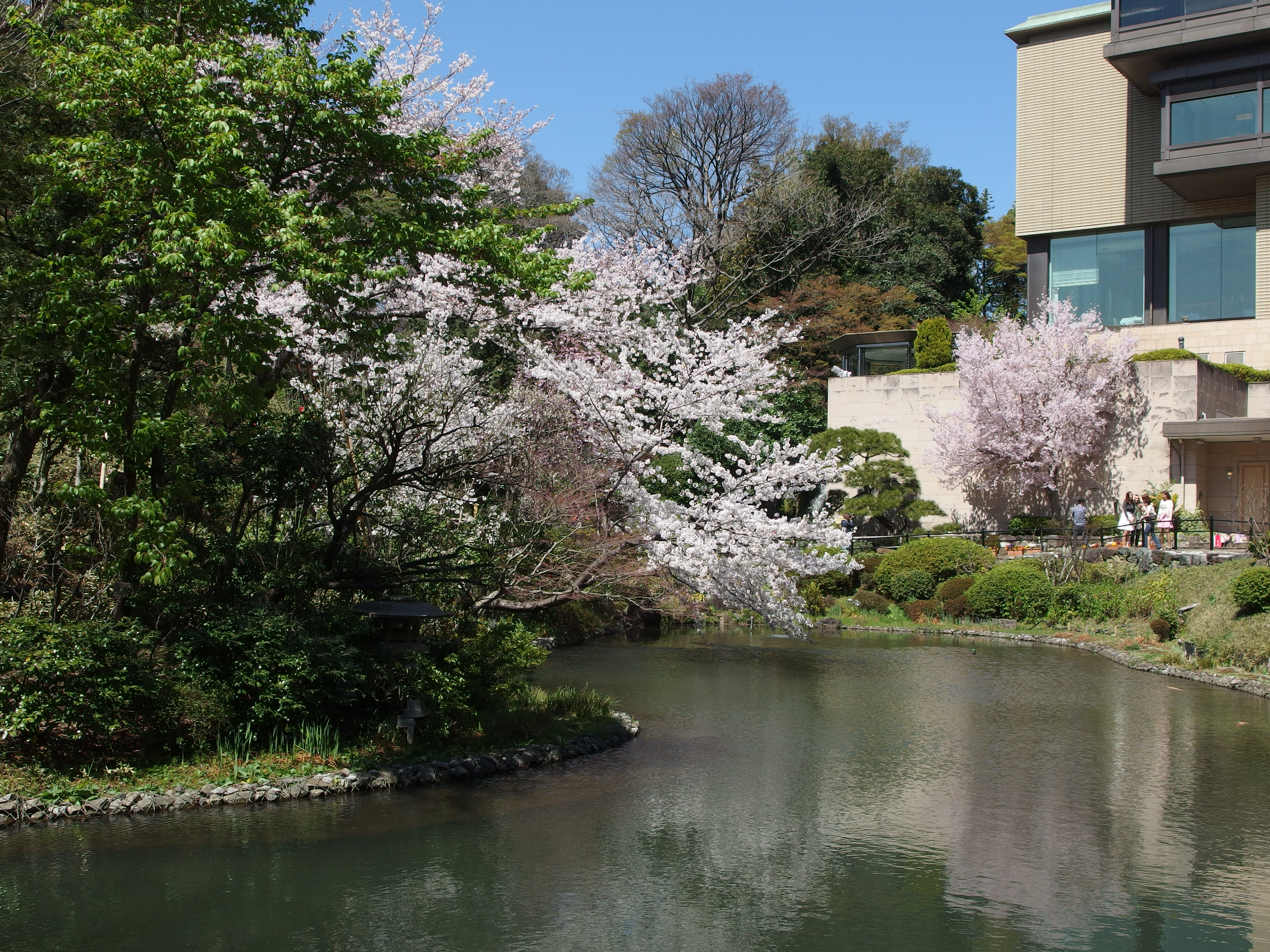
- Main building complex
- Interactive map of the Hotel Chinzanso Tokyo area

General information
- Location: 10-8, Sekiguchi 2-chome, Bunkyo-ku, 112-8680 Tokyo, Japan
- Opening: January 1st, 2013
- Owner: Fujita Kanko Inc.

Technical details
- Floor area: 84,867 m^{2}

Other information
- Number of rooms: 260
- Number of restaurants: 12

Website
- http://www.hotel-chinzanso-tokyo.com

Hotel Chinzanso Tokyo (Japanese: ホテル椿山荘東京) is a five star hotel in Bunkyō, Tokyo. The property is divided into four areas – the hotel building, the Tower building, the Plaza building, and Chinzan-so garden. The hotel has 260 rooms and suites, 12 restaurants and bars, 36 meeting and banquet rooms and Tokyo's largest hotel spa facility, Yu, The Spa.

== History ==
For over six centuries, the land surrounding Hotel Chinzanso Tokyo has been home to wild camellias. It was featured in a wood block print by the ukiyoe artist Ando Hiroshige (1797-1858). The current name of the garden "Chinzanso" was given by Yamagata Aritomo (1838-1922), an influential member of a group of elderly statesmen known as the Genrō in the Meiji (1868-1912) and Taishō (1912–26) eras. In 1918, reflecting the will of Yamagata, the property was assigned to Baron Fujita Heitaro. Though the garden was destroyed during World War II, reconstruction began in 1948 under the direction of Ogawa Eiichi, the founder of the company now known as Fujita Kankō, whose vision of "building a green oasis in Tokyo" included the transportation of more than 10,000 trees.

On November 11, 1952, a grand opening ceremony for the new Chinzanso garden and reception center took place. On January 1, 2013, after 20 years of operation as a Four Seasons, the hotel was integrated with Chinzanso reception center and renamed "Hotel Chinzanso Tokyo".

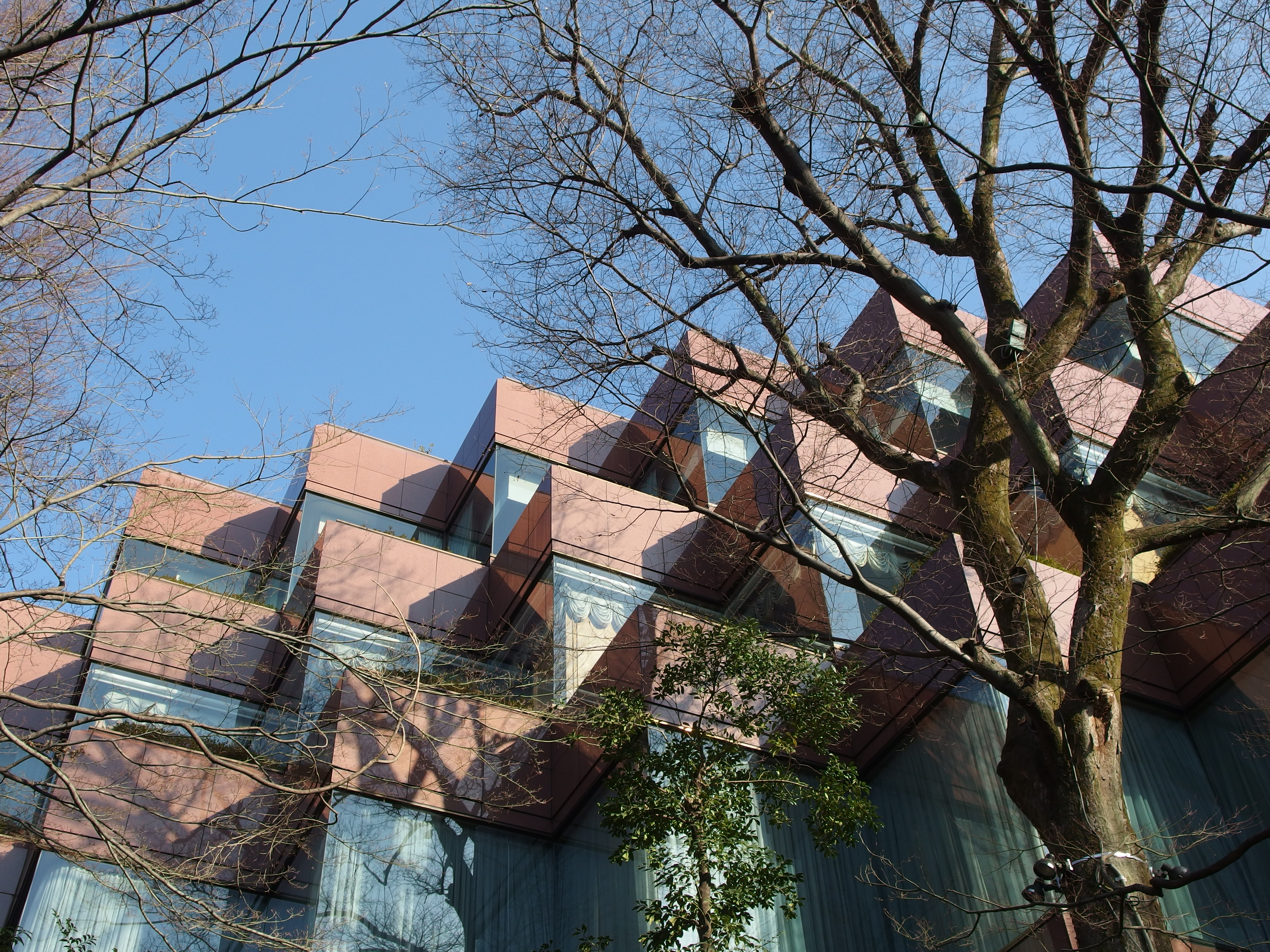
Guest rooms seen from the outside

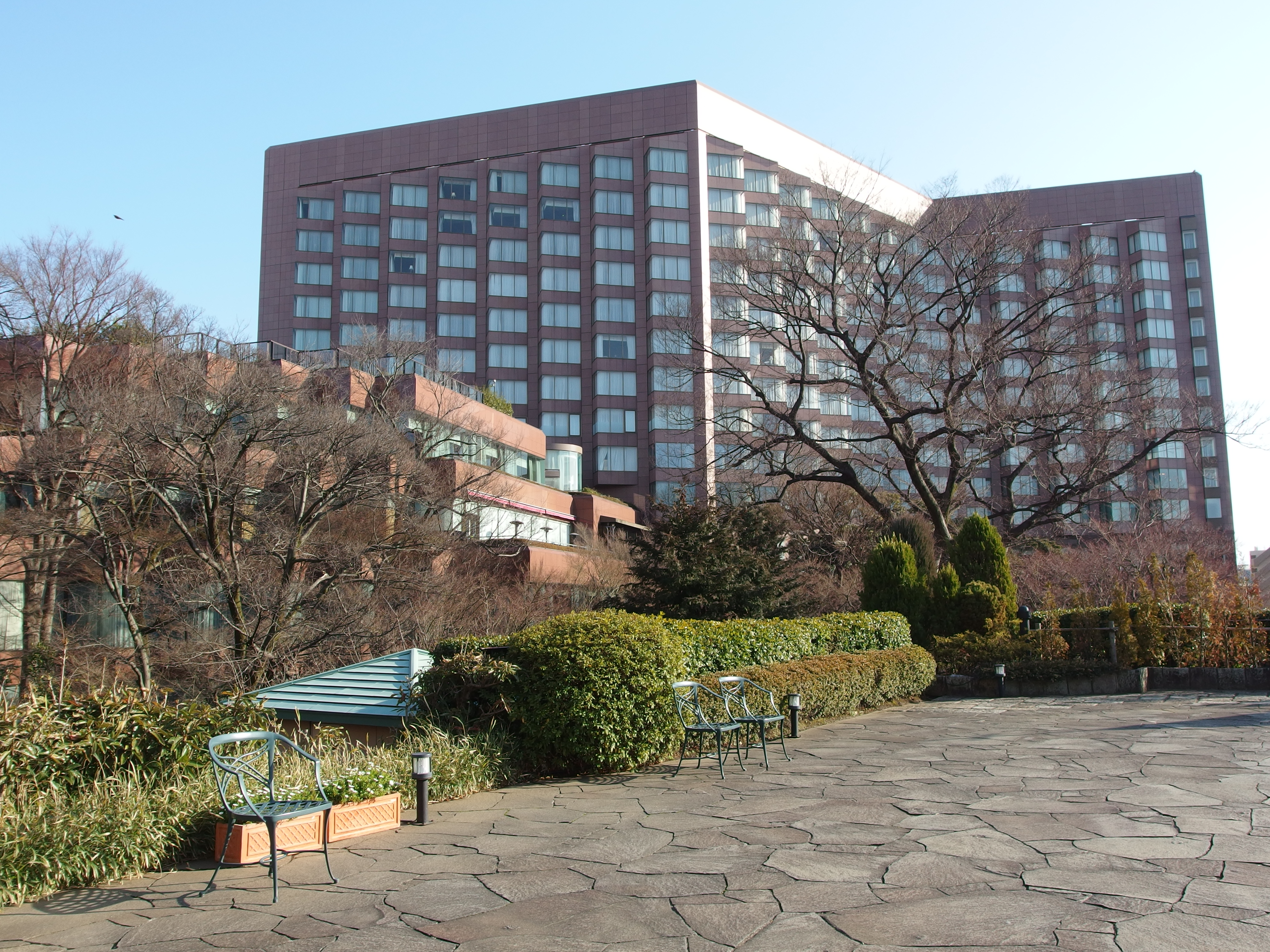
Main building complex seen from a distance

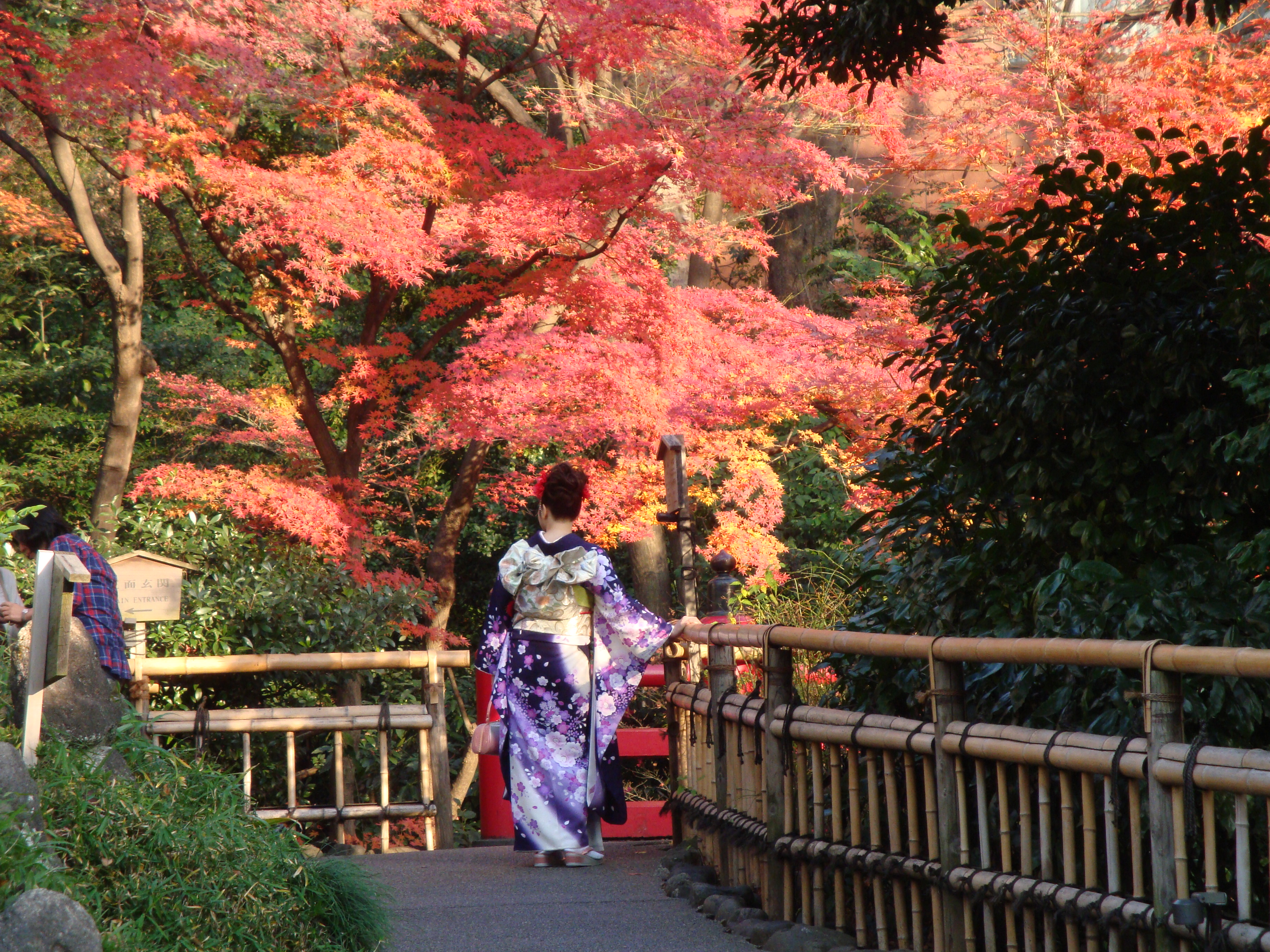
Hotel Garden in autumn

== Dining ==
- Il Teatro – Italian Restaurant [Hotel building]
- Camellia – French Restaurant [Plaza building]
- Ryotei Kinsui - Kaiseki Dining [Garden]
- Hanaguruma – Casual Japanese Restaurant [Garden]
- Miyuki – Japanese Restaurant [Hotel building]
- Mokushundo – Stone-grilling and Kaiseki Restaurant[Garden]
- Muchaan – Soba Dining [Garden]
- Chuuan – Sushi Dining [Garden]
- The Bistro – Casual Dining [Hotel building]
- Le Jardin – Bar [Hotel building]
- Foresta – Café [Plaza building]
- Le Marquis – Main Bar [Hotel building]

== Spa ==
The hotel's on-site spa facility, Yu, The Spa offers over 40 types of treatments, from traditional Japanese body treatments to specialized programs for pregnant women and new mothers. Facilities include:

- Indoor heated pool with retractable roof
- Outdoor pool with a waterfall
- Jacuzzi and sauna
- Japanese onsen baths
