= Kansen-en Park =

Garden in Tokyo, Japan

- 甘泉園公園
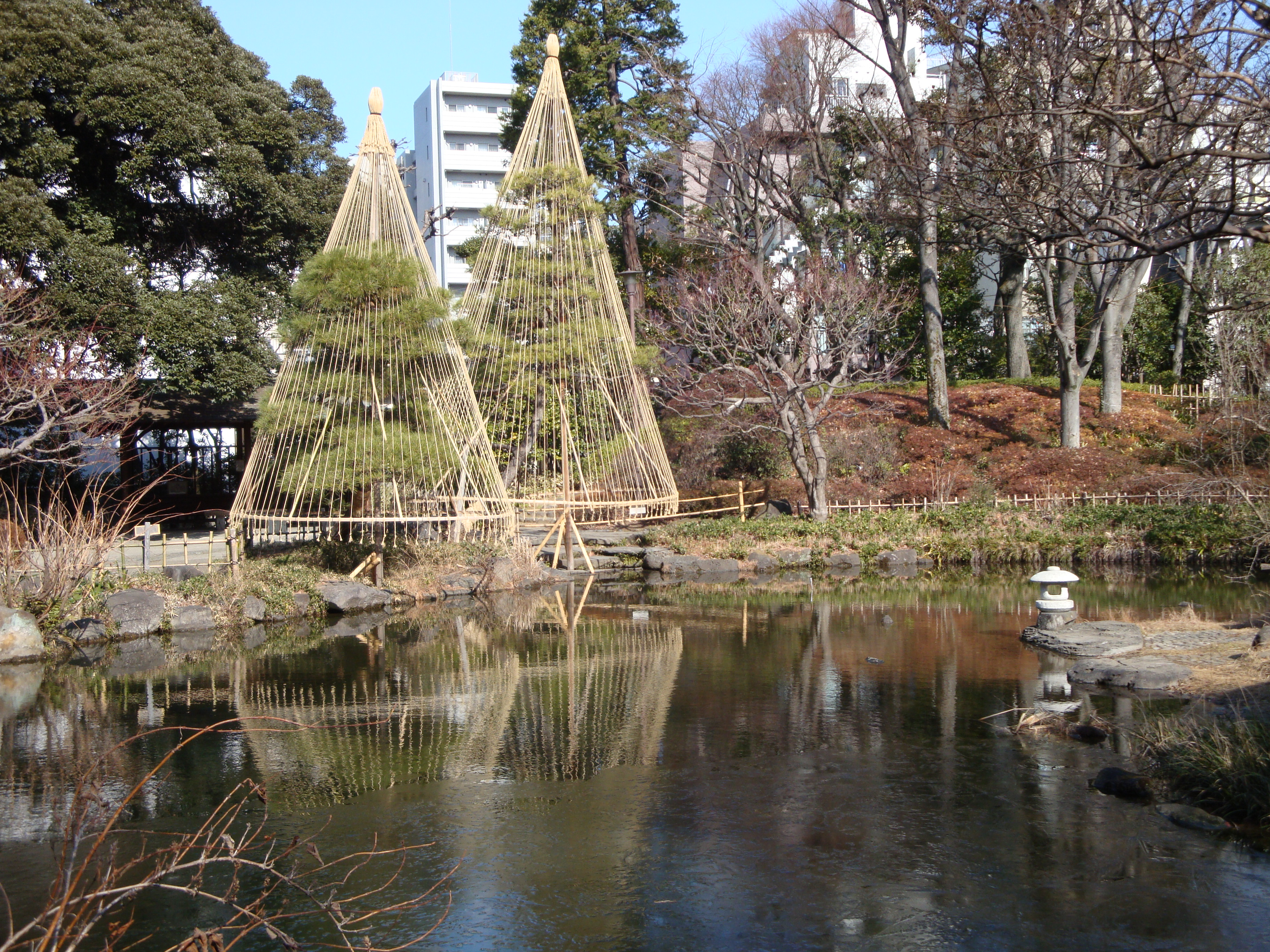
- Pond of Kansen-en
- Interactive map of Kansen-en Park
- Type: Japanese garden
- Location: Shinjuku, Tokyo, Japan
- Coordinates: 35.7117°N 139.7161°E
- Area: 14,000 m^{2} (150,000 sq ft)

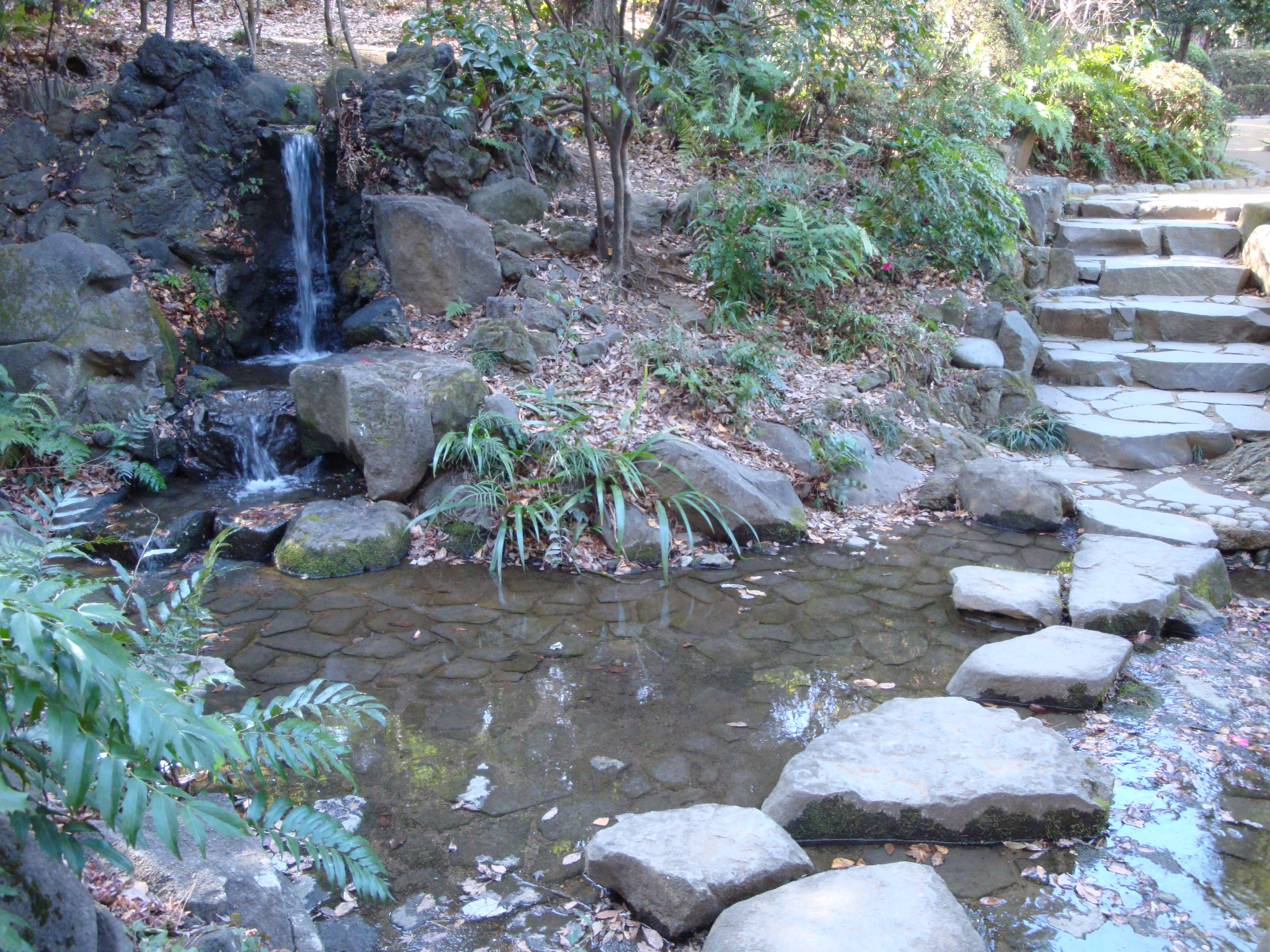
Sweet spring of the garden

Kansen-en Park (甘泉園公園, Kansen-en Kōen) is a Japanese garden located in Shinjuku, Tokyo. It covers an area of about 14,000 m^{2} (150,000 sq ft).

This small park was previously the residence of the Shimizu family, one of Tokugawa Gosankyō, and one of the most prominent families of the Edo era. After the Meiji Restoration in 1867, it was transferred to Marquis Souma.

The name Kansen-en (literally "sweet spring garden") derives from the fact that the spring water in the garden was sweet and suitable for tea. Since Kansen-en was built during the Edo period, its style is typically Edo. There is a gourd-shaped pond, called Yamabuki-no-ido (meaning "well of the Japanese roses"), in the middle of the garden, which is surrounded by flowering shrubs. At the south end of the park is Mishima-Yama mountain. Mizu-Inari Shrine is also located on the site.

The park is located approximately 10 minutes' walk from Waseda Station, and it is open from 07:00 until 19:00 (until 17:00 from November to February).
