= Toyama, Shinjuku =

Toyama 戸山
- District
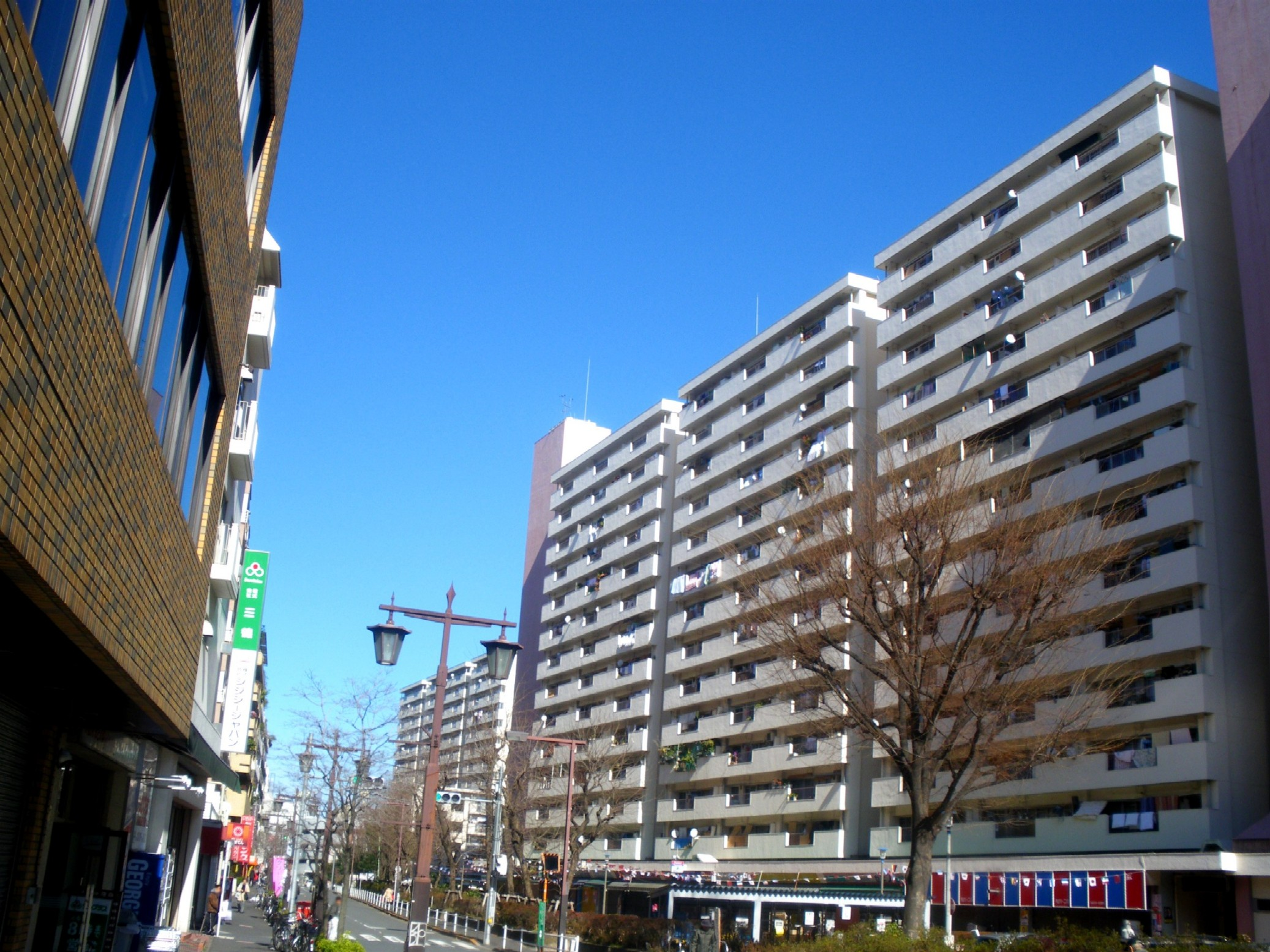

- Location within Special wards of Tokyo
- Coordinates: 35°42′13.298″N 139°42′51.224″E
- Country: Japan
- City: Tokyo
- Ward: Shinjuku

Population (December 1, 2017)
  - Total: 9,203
- Time zone: UTC+9 (JST)
- Postal code: 169-0052 (3-18.21); 162-0052 (Other)
- Area code: 03

Toyama (Japanese: 戸山) is a district of Shinjuku, Tokyo, Japan. It is known for Toyama Heights, one of the first and largest danchi (public housing) complexes in Tokyo for low-income households.

== Education ==
The Shinjuku City Board of Education operates public elementary and junior high schools.

Toyama 2-chome and portions of 1-chome (20-21 ban) and most of 3-chome are zoned to Higashitoyama Elementary School (東戸山小学校). The rest of 1-chome is zoned to Waseda Elementary School (早稲田小学校). 3-chome 18-ban is zoned to Toyama Elementary School (戸山小学校). 3-chome 21-ban is zoned to Totsuka No. 2 Elementary School (戸塚第二小学校). Almost all of Toyama is zoned to Shinjuku Junior High School (新宿中学校). However 3-chome 18-ban and 21-ban are zoned instead to Nishiwaseda Junior High School (新宿区立西早稲田中学校).
