= Tokyo Toden =

Toden (streetcar) network in Tokyo, Japan

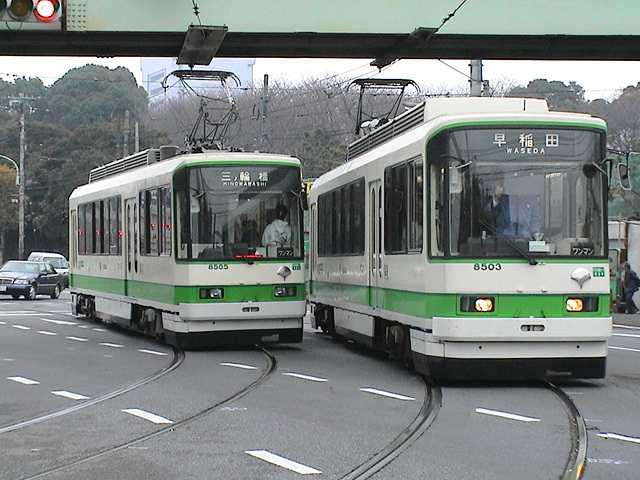
- Toden cars crossing

Overview
- Native name: 東京都電
- Transit type: Tram
- Number of lines: 1
- Number of stations: 30
- Daily ridership: 47,504 (2018)
- Website: www.kotsu.metro.tokyo.jp

Operation
- Began operation: 1882; 144 years ago 1903; 123 years ago (electrification)
- Operator: Tokyo Metropolitan Bureau of Transportation
- Number of vehicles: 7700 series; 8500 series; 8800 series; 8900 series; 9000 series

Technical
- System length: 12.2 km (7.6 mi)
- Track gauge: 1,372 mm (4 ft 6 in)
- Electrification: 600 DC (Overhead line)
- Top speed: 40 km/h (25 mph)

The Tokyo Toden (Japanese: 東京都電, Hepburn: Tōkyō Toden) or simply Toden, is the tram network of Tokyo, Japan. Of all its former routes, only one, the Tokyo Sakura Tram, remains in service. The Tokyo Metropolitan Bureau of Transportation operates the Toden. The formal legal name is Tokyo-to Densha. Its nickname, "Toden," distinguished it from the "Kokuden" (the Japanese National Railways electrified lines).

The network had a track gauge of 1,372 mm (4 ft 6 in), except for the former Seibu Railway lines which were 1,067 mm (3 ft 6 in). Today, the Toden has 30 stops, running from Minowabashi Station to Waseda Station.

== History ==
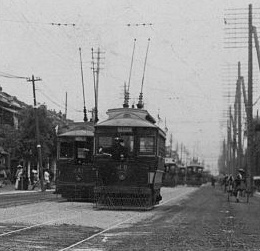
The Tokyo Electric Railway trams in 1905.

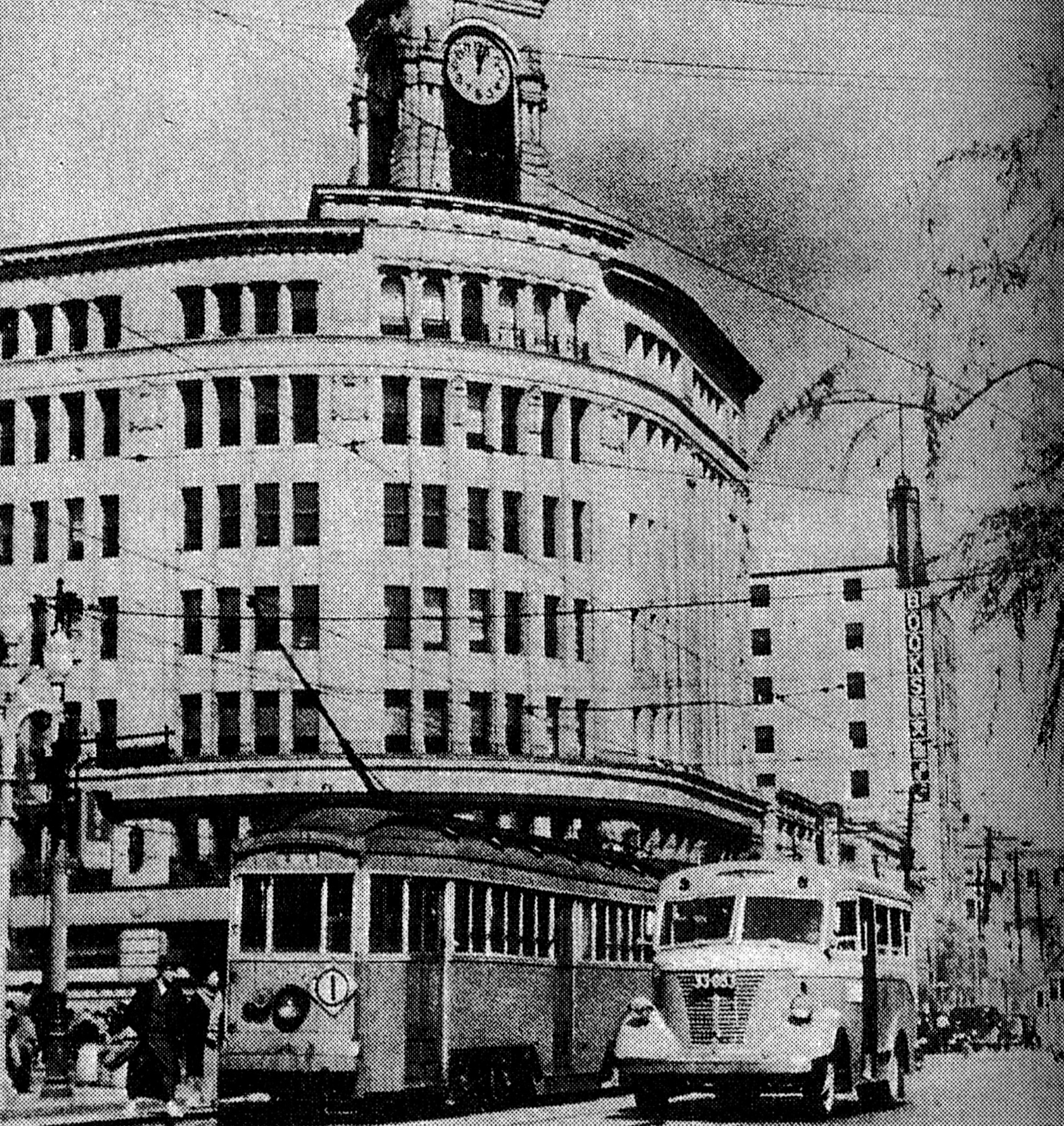
Ginza street in 1939.

At its peak, the Toden system boasted 41 routes with 213 kilometres (132 mi) of track. However, the increase in reliance on automobile traffic resulted in reductions in ridership, and from 1967 to 1972, 181 kilometres (112 mi) of track were abandoned as the Bureau changed its emphasis to bus and subway modes of transportation.

- 1882: The Tokyo Horse-drawn Railway (東京馬車鉄道) opened Japan's first horse-drawn tram system. Founded in 1880, the first route opened in June 1882 between Shimbashi and Nihonbashi. By October 1882, it formed a circular route connecting Nihonbashi, Ueno, and Asakusa.
- 1903: The Tokyo Horse-drawn Railway changed its motive power to electricity and, under the name Tokyo Electric Railway (or Tōden, 東電) commenced operations between Shinagawa and Shimbashi.
- 1903: The Tokyo Urban Railway (or Gaitetsu, 街鉄) began operations between Sukiyabashi (in Ginza) and Kandabashi.
- 1904: The Tokyo Electric Railway (Sotobori Line) connecting Shimbashi Station and Ochanomizu opened.
- 1905: The three companies published the "Tokyo Geography Education Streetcar Song" to promote knowledge of the geography of Tokyo.
- 1906: The three companies merged to form the Tokyo Railways.
- 1911: Tokyo City purchased the Tokyo Railways, established its Electric Bureau, and inaugurated the Tokyo City Streetcar (東京市電) system.
- 1911–1922: The streetcar network expands, with various new companies and lines serving areas in the city and to the west.
- 1933: The route from Shinagawa Station to North Shinagawa Station is abandoned.
- 1933–1943: New companies, mergers, and realignments alter the network.
- 1943: Tokyo City is abolished and the larger Tokyo Prefecture assumes its administrative functions. The Tokyo City Streetcar bureau becomes the Tokyo Metropolitan Bureau of Transportation.
- 1944: Service is stopped on nine segments.
- 1945–1951: During the Occupation of Japan, the network evolved slowly.
- 1952: The segment of the Imai Line between Higashi-arakawa and Imaibashi Stations was replaced with trolley buses.
- 1953, 1961: Two segments (one in Shinjuku and the other connecting Shimbashi Station and Shiodome) stop operating.
- 1963: In preparation for the Tokyo Olympics, two segments (Kita-Aoyama Itchome – Miyakezaka and Hanzōmon – Kudanshita) cease operations. The Suginami Line (Shinjuku – Ogikubo) closes because it duplicates a line of the Eidan Subway.
- 1967–1972: A plan for financial restructuring is put into effect in seven stages, resulting in the closure of most of the network.
- 1974: A plan for abandoning the remaining track is cancelled. The remaining routes are consolidated into a single line, named the Arakawa Line.
- 1978: One-man operation begins.
- 1990: The 8500 Series rolling stock is introduced. It is the first new design in 28 years.
- 2000: A new station, Arakawa-itchūmae, opens between two existing stations.
- 2007: 9000 Series rolling stock was scheduled for introduction.

== Lines ==
Name	Japanese	Termini		Length	Number of stations
Arakawa Line	都電荒川線	Waseda	Minowabashi	12.2 km (7.6 mi)	30

== Former lines ==
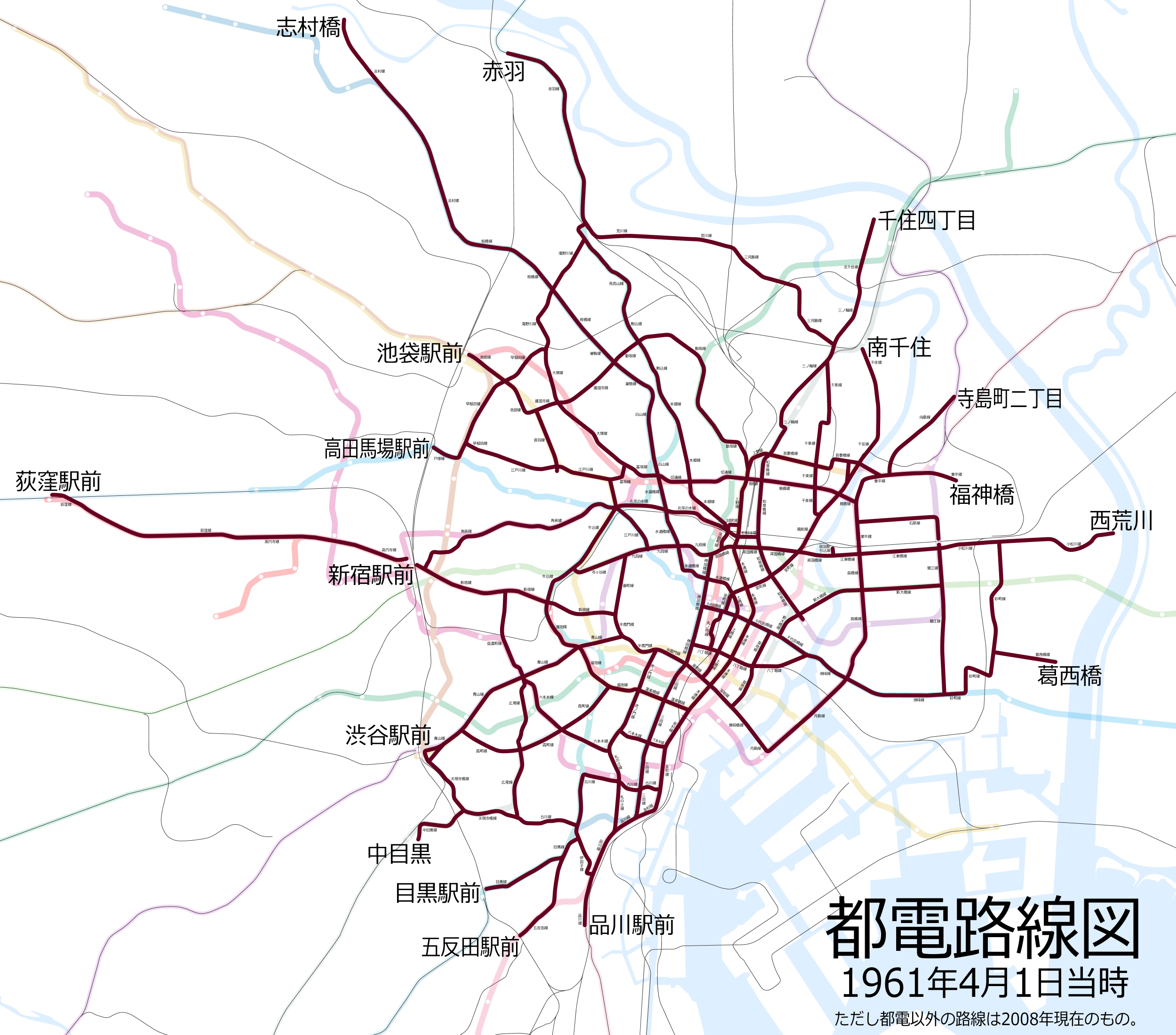
The network in 1961

This is the list of former lines, listed according to their official names. Corresponding routes are those of 1962. The first section of the lines opened in the listed opening years, while the last section of the lines closed in the listed closing years.

Line	Route(s)	Termini	Opened	Closed	Notes
Tōkyō Electric Railway (Tōden) lines
Azumabashi Line	24 30	Ueno-Ekimae – Honjo-Azumabashi	1904	1972	
Hondōri Line	1 4 19 22 40	Shimbashi – Sudachō	1903	1971	
Kanasugi Line	1 4	Mita – Shimbashi	1903	1969	
Kuramae Line	22 31	Kaminarimon – Asakusabashi	1904	1971	
Muromachi Line	22 31	Asakusabashi – Marunouchi-Itchōme	1904	1971	
Shinagawa Line	1 3 7	Kita-Shinagawa – Mita	1903	1967	Keihin Electric Railway trains (the present Keihin Electric Express Railway) operated over the Shinagawa–Kita-Shinagawa section
Ueno Line	1 19 20 24 30 37 40	Sudachō – Ueno-Ekimae	1903	1972	
Tōkyō Urban Railway lines
Aoyama Line	6 9 10	Miyakezaka – Shibuya-Ekimae	c. 1904	1968	
Bammachi Line	10	Hanzōmon – Kudanshita	c. 1905	1963	
Chiyodabashi Line	15 28 38	Ōtemachi – Eitaibashi	c. 1904	1972	
Edogawa Line	15 39	Kudanshita – Waseda	c. 1905	1968	
Hamachō Line		Ningyōchō – Ryōgoku	c. 1904	1944	
Hanzōmon Line	8 9 10 11	Hibiya-Kōen – Hanzōmon	1903	1968	
Hongō Line	19	Circa Sudachō – Hakusan-ue	1904	1971	
Hōraibashi Line		Miharabashi – Hōraibashi	c. 1904	c. 1909	
Ichigaya Line	12		c. 1905	1970	
Kandabashi Line	2 5 15 25 35 37	Hibiya-Kōen – Ogawamachi	1903	1968	
Kiridōshi Line	16 39	Bunkyō-Kuyakusho-mae – Ueno-Hirokōji	c. 1904	1971	
Kōtōbashi Line	25 29 38	Ryōgoku-Nichōme – Kinshibori	c. 1905	1972	
Kudan Line	10 12 15	Ogawamachi – Kudanshita	c. 1904	1970	
Mita Line	2 5 35 37	Mita – Hibiya-Kōen	c. 1904	1968	
Narihira Line	16 23 24	Midorichō-Itchōme – Fukujimbashi; Narihirabashi – Asakusa-Ekimae (the present Tōbu Narihirabashi Station.)	c. 1905	1972	
Ryōgokubashi Line	10 12 25 29	Ogawamachi – Ryōgoku-Nichōme	1903	1972	
Shinjuku Line	11 12 13	Hanzōmon – Shinjuku-Ekimae	1903	1970	
Suzaki Line	28 38	Eitaibashi – Tōyō-Kōen-mae; Fukushimabashi (Eitai-Nichōme) – Kamezumichō (Fukagawa-Itchōme)	c. 1904	1972	
Toranomon Line	3 8	Sakuradamon – Kamiyachō; Toranomon – Reinanzaka	c. 1905	1968	
Tsukiji Line	8 9 11 36	Hibiya-Kōen – Kayabachō ( – Ningyōchō)	1903	1971	
Umayabashi Line	16 39	Ueno-Hirokōji – Honjo-Itchōme	c. 1905	1971	
Tōkyō Electric Railway (Sotobori Line) lines
Dobashi Line	17	Shin-Tokiwabashi – Shimbashi-eki-Kitaguchi	c. 1904	1968	
Hiroo Line	7	Aoyama-Itchōme – Tengenjibashi	c. 1905	1969	
Hōraibashi Line	6	Miharabashi – Toranomon	c. 1905	1967	
Nishikichō Line		Ochanomizu – Shin-Tokiwabashi	c. 1904	1944	
Ochanomizu Line	13 19	Iidabashi – Akihabara-eki-Higashiguchi	c. 1905	1971	
Shinanomachi Line	7 33	Yotsuya-Sanchōme – Kita-Aoyama-Itchōme	c. 1905	1969	
Tameike Line	3 6	Toranomon – Yotsuya-Mitsuke	c. 1905	1967	
Ushigome Line	3 12	Yotsuya-Mitsuke – Iidabashi	c. 1905	1970	
Tōkyō Railways lines
Furukawa Line	4 5 7 8 34	Tengenjibashi – Kanasugibashi	c. 1910	1969	tracks were in a center median near Ichinohashi
Hakusan Line	2 18 35	Bunkyō-Kuyakusho-mae – Hakusan-ue	c. 1910	1968	
Izumibashi Line	13 21	Doshūbashi – Ueno-Ekimae	c. 1910	1970	tracks were in a center median on Shōwa Street near Ueno Station
Minowa Line	21 31		c. 1910	1969	
Ōtsuka Line	16 17	Denzūin-mae – Ōtsuka-Ekimae	c. 1910	1971	
Senju Line	22	Komagata-Nichōme – Minami-Senju	c. 1910	1971	
Sugamo Line	2 18 35	Hakusan-ue – Sugamo-Shako-mae	c. 1910	1968	
Suidōbashi Line	2 17 18 35	Shin-Tokiwabashi – Bunkyō-Kuyakusho-mae	c. 1910	1968	
Takahashi Line	23	Monzen-Nakachō – Midorichō-Itchōme	c. 1910	1972	
Tomisaka Line	16 17 39	Ōmagari – Bunkyō-Kuyakusho-mae	c. 1910	1971	
Ōji Electric Tramway lines
Akabane Line	27	Ōji-Ekimae – Akabane	1926	1972	
Arakawa Line	27 32	Kumanomae – Ōji-Ekimae	1913	still open	present Arakawa Line
Mikawashima Line	27	Minowabashi – Kumanomae	1913	still open	present Arakawa Line
Takinogawa Line	32	Ōji-Ekimae – Ōtsuka-Ekimae	1911	still open	present Arakawa Line
Waseda Line	32	Ōtsuka-Ekimae – Waseda	1925	still open	present Arakawa Line
Jōtō Electric Tramway lines
Ichinoe Line	26	Higashi-Arakawa – Imaibashi	1925	1952	commonly called Imai Line; an isolated line with no connection stations to other lines in the network
Komatsugawa Line	25 29 38	Kinshibori – Nishi-Arakawa	1917	1972	tracks were in a center median on Keiyō Road near Kameido Station
Sunamachi Line	29 38	Suijimmori – Suzaki	1921	1972	
Tamagawa Electric Railway lines
Naka-Meguro Line	8	Shibuyabashi – Naka-Meguro	1927	1967	
Tengenjibashi Line	8 34	Shibuya-Ekimae – Tengenjibashi	1921	1969	
the former Seibu Railway lines
Kōenji Line	14	Shinjuku-Ekimae – Kōenji-Itchōme	1921	1963	commonly called Suginami Line
Ogikubo Line	14	Kōenji-Itchōme – Ogikubo-Ekimae	1921	1963	commonly called Suginami Line
Other
Asukayama Line	19	Komagome-Ekimae – Asukayama	c. 1920	1971	
Awajimachi Line	37	Awajimachi – Soto-Kanda-Sanchōme	c. 1920	1967	
Dōzaka Line	20 37 40	Ueno-Kōen – Sengoku-Itchōme	late 1910s	1971	private right-of-way between Ueno-Kōen-mae and Nezu-Itchōme, beside Shinobazu Pond
Ebisu Line		Tengenjibashi – Ebisu-Chōjamaru	1913	1944	also called Toyosawa Line or Tengenji Line
Fudanotsuji Line	3 8	Iikura-Itchōme – Fudanotsuji	c. 1912	1967	
Gokokuji Line	17 20	Sengoku-Itchōme – Gokokuji-mae	c. 1920	1971	
Gotanda Line	4	Seishōkō-mae – Gotanda-Ekimae	late 1920s	1967	
Hatchōbori Line	5	Baba-Sakimon – Eitaibashi	c. 1920	1967	
Ikebukuro Line	17	Gokokuji-mae – Ikebukuro-Ekimae	early 1930s	1969	
Isarago Line	4 5 7	Furukawabashi – Sengakuji	c. 1912	1969	
Ishiwara Line	16	Ishiwarachō-Itchōme – Kinshichō-Ekimae (Kitaguchi); Taiheichō-Sanchōme – Kameido-Tenjimbashi	late 1920s	1971	
Itabashi Line	18 41	Sugamo-Shako-mae – Itabashi-Ekimae	late 1920s	1966	sometimes included with the Shimura Line
Kachidokibashi Line	11	Tsukiji-Tsukishima	1947	1968	
Kasaibashi Line	29	Sakaigawa – Kasaibashi	early 1940s	1972	
Kasumichō Line	6	Tameike – Minami-Aoyama-Gochōme	late 1910s	1967	
Kita-Senju Line	21	Senju-Ōhashi – Senju-Yonchōme	late 1920s	1968	
Komagome Line	19	Mukōgaoka-Nichōme – Komagome-Ekimae	late 1910s	1971	
Marunouchi Line	28 31	Marunouchi-Itchōme – Tochō-mae	c. 1920	1969	
Meguro Line	4 5	Gyoranzaka-shita – Meguro-Ekimae	c. 1912	1967	
Mukōjima Line	30	Honjo-Azumabashi – Higashi-Mukōjima-Nichōme	late 1920s	1969	
Otowa Line	20	Gokokuji-mae – Yaraishita	late 1920s	1971	
Roppongi Line	3 8 33	Hamamatsuchō-Itchōme – Kita-Aoyama-Itchōme	1912	1969	
Ryōgoku-eki Leading Line	12	Ryōgoku-Nichōme – Ryōgoku-Ekimae	1923	1968	
Sarue Line	28 36	Kinshichō-Ekimae (Minamiguchi) – Tōyō-Kōen-mae	late 1920s	1972	
Senzoku Line	31	Kuramae-Itchōme – Minowa-Shako-mae	c. 1920	1969	
Shibaura Line		Tōkyō-Kōguchi – Shibaura-Nichōme	1910	1969	passenger service started in the 1920s
Shimura Line	18 41	Itabashi-Ekimae – Shimurabashi	early 1940s	1966	
Shin-Ōhashi Line	9 36	Kayabachō – Sumiyoshichō-Nichōme	c. 1912	1971	
Totsuka Line	15	Takadanobaba-Ekimae – Omokagebashi	?	1968	opening year unknown
Tsukishima Line	23	Monzen-Nakachō – Tsukishima	c. 1920	1972	
Tsunohazu Line	13	Iidabashi – Yotsuya-Sankōchō	c. 1912	1970	

=== Routes ===
As of 1962, there were 41 routes in operation; the maximum for the system:

Nº	Terminus	via	Terminus
1	Shinagawa-Ekimae	Shinagawa Line – Kanasugi Line – Hondōri Line – Ueno Line	Ueno-Ekimae
2	Mita	Mita Line – Kandabashi Line – Suidōbashi Line – Hakusan Line – Sugamo Line	Tōyō-Daigaku-mae
3	Shinagawa-Ekimae	Shinagawa Line – Fudanotsuji Line – Roppongi Line – Toranomon Line – Tameike Line – Ushigome Line	Iidabashi
4	Gotanda-Ekimae	Gotanda Line – Meguro Line – Isarago Line – Furukawa Line – Kanasugi Line – Hondōri Line	Ginza-Nichōme
5	Meguro-Ekimae	Meguro Line – Isarago Line – Furukawa Line – Mita Line – Kandabashi Line – Hatchōbori Line	Eitaibashi
6	Shibuya-Ekimae	Aoyama Line – Kasumichō Line – Tameike Line – Hōraibashi Line	Shimbashi
7	Yotsuya-Sanchōme	Shinanomachi Line – Hiroo Line – Furukawa Line – Isarago Line – Shinagawa Line	Shinagawa-Ekimae
8	Naka-Meguro	Naka-Meguro Line – Tengenjibashi Line – Furukawa Line – Fudanotsuji Line – Roppongi Line – Toranomon Line – Hanzōmon Line – Tsukiji Line	Tsukiji
9	Shibuya-Ekimae	Aoyama Line – Hanzōmon Line – Tsukiji Line – Shin-Ōhashi Line	Hamachō-Nakanohashi
10	Shibuya-Ekimae	Aoyama Line – Hanzōmon Line – Bammachi Line – Kudanshita Line – Ryōgokubashi Line	Sudachō
11	Shinjuku-Ekimae	Shinjuku Line – Hanzōmon Line – Tsukiji Line – Kachidokibashi Line	Tsukishima
12	Shinjuku-Ekimae	Shinjuku Line – Ushigome Line – Ichigaya Line – Kudan Line – Ryōgokubashi Line – Ryōgoku-eki Leading Line	Ryōgoku-Ekimae
13	Shinjuku-Ekimae	Shinjuku Line – Tsunohazu Line – Ochanomizu Line – Izumibashi Line	Suitengū-mae
14	Shinjuku-Ekimae	Kōenji Line – Ogikubo Line	Ogikubo-Ekimae
15	Takadanobaba-Ekimae	Totsuka Line – Waseda Line – Edogawa Line – Kudan Line – Kandabashi Line – Chiyodabashi Line	Kayabachō
16	Ōtsuka-Ekimae	Ōtsuka Line – Tomisaka Line – Kiridōshi Line – Umayabashi Line – Narihira Line – Ishiwara Line	Kinshichō-Ekimae
17	Ikebukuro-Ekimae	Ikebukuro Line – Gokokuji Line – Ōtsuka Line – Tomisaka Line – Suidōbashi Line – Dobashi Line	Sukiyabashi
18	Shimura-Sakaue	Shimura Line – Itabashi Line – Sugamo Line – Hakusan Line – Suidōbashi Line	Kandabashi
19	Ōji-Ekimae	Takinogawa Line – Asukayama Line – Komagome Line – Hongō Line – Ochanomizu Line – Ueno Line – Hondōri Line	Tōri-Sanchōme
20	Edogawabashi	Otowa Line – Gokokuji Line – Dōzaka Line – Ueno Line	Sudachō
21	Senju-Yonchōme	Kita-Senju Line – Minowa Line – Izumibashi Line	Suitengū-mae
22	Minami-Senju	Senju Line – Kuramae Line – Muromachi Line – Hondōri Line	Shimbashi
22	Kaminarimon	Kuramae Line – Muromachi Line – Hondōri Line (additional service)	Shimbashi
23	Fukujimbashi	Narihira Line – Takahashi Line – Tsukishima Line	Tsukishima
24	Fukujimbashi	Narihira Line – Azumabashi Line – Ueno Line	Sudachō
25	Nishi-Arakawa	Komatsugawa Line – Kōtōbashi Line – Ryōgokubashi Line – Kandabashi Line	Hibiya-Kōen
26	Higashi-Arakawa	Ichinoe Line	Imaibashi
27	Minowabashi	Mikawashima Line – Arakawa Line – Akabane Line	Akabane
28	Kinshichō-Ekimae	Sarue Line – Suzaki Line – Chiyodabashi Line – Marunouchi Line	Tochō-mae
29	Kasaibashi	Kasaibashi Line – Sunamachi Line – Komatsugawa Line – Kōtōbashi Line – Ryōgokubashi Line	Sudachō
29	Kasaibashi	Kasaibashi Line – Sunamachi Line – Suzaki Line – Chiyodabashi Line (morning and evening only)	Nihombashi
30	Higashi-Mukōjima-Nichōme	Mukōjima Line – Azumabashi Line – Ueno Line	Sudachō
31	Minowabashi	Mikawashima Line – Senzoku Line – Kuramae Line – Muromachi Line – Marunouchi Line	Tochō-mae
32	Arakawa-Shako-mae	Arakawa Line – Takinogawa Line – Waseda Line	Waseda
33	Yotsuya-Sanchōme	Shinanomachi Line – Roppongi Line	Hamamatsuchō-Itchōme
34	Shibuya-Ekimae	Tengenjibashi Line	Tengenjibashi
35	Sugamo-Shako-mae	Sugamo Line – Hakusan Line – Suidōbashi Line – Kandabashi Line – Mita Line	Nishi-Shimbashi-Itchōme
36	Kinshichō-Ekimae	Sarue Line – Shin-Ōhashi Line – Tsukiji Line	Tsukiji
37	Mita	Mita Line – Kandabashi Line – Ryōgokubashi Line – Awajichō Line – Ueno Line – Dōzaka Line	Sendagi-Nichōme
38	Kishinbori-Shako-mae	Kōtōbashi Line – Komatsugawa Line – Sunamachi Line – Suzaki Line – Chiyodabashi Line	Nihombashi
39	Waseda	Edogawa Line – Tomisaka Line – Kiridōshi Line – Umayabashi Line	Umayabashi
40	Shimmeichō-Shako-mae	Dōzaka Line – Ueno Line – Hondōri Line	Ginza-Nanachōme
41	Shimurabashi	Shimura Line – Itabashi Line	Sugamo-Shako-mae

Note: Route 26 discontinued by 1952.
