= 8900 series =

8900 series may refer to:

- Shin-Keisei 8900 series, a train type operated in Japan by Shin-Keisei Railway
- Toei 8900 series, a tramcar type operated in Tokyo, Japan, by Toei
