= 7700 series =

7700 series may refer to:

- Toei 7700 series
- Tokyu 7700 series
