= Toei 7000 series =

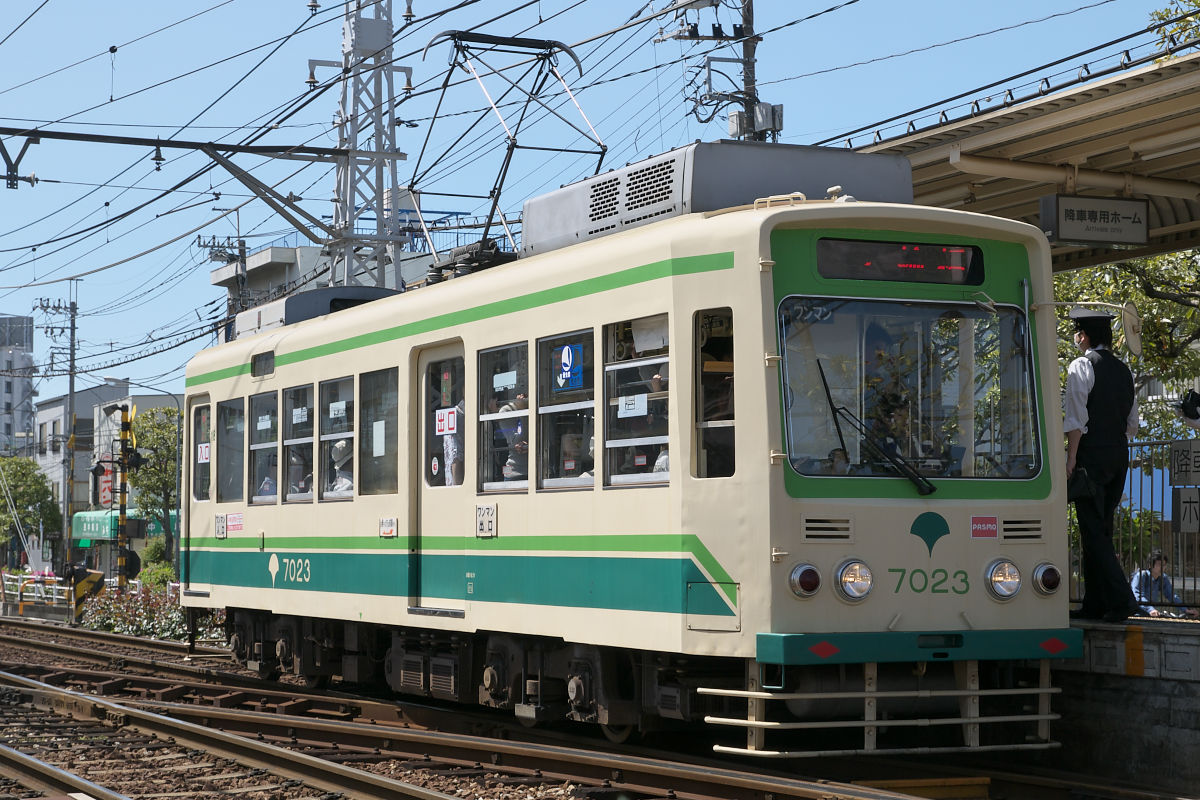
- 7000 series car 7023 in June 2009
- In service: 1955 – 10 June 2017
- Manufacturers: Hitachi, Nippon Sharyo, Alna Koki
- Constructed: 1955–1956
- Refurbished: 1977; 2016 (8 vehicles)
- Scrapped: 1991–
- Number built: 31 vehicles
- Number in service: None
- Number preserved: 2 vehicles
- Formation: Single car
- Fleet numbers: 7001–7031
- Operator: Tokyo Metropolitan Bureau of Transportation
- Depot: Arakawa
- Line served: Toden Arakawa Line

Specifications
- Car body construction: Steel
- Doors: 2 sliding doors per side
- Electric system: 600 V DC Overhead wire
- Current collection: Pantograph
- Track gauge: 1,372 mm (4 ft 6 in)

The Toei 7000 series (東京都交通局7000形) is a tramcar type formerly operated by Tokyo Metropolitan Bureau of Transportation (Toei) on the Toden Arakawa Line in Tokyo, Japan. The tramcars date from the 1950s, but were rebuilt in 1977 with new bodies. The last remaining 7000 series tramcars were withdrawn following the final day of operations on 10 June 2017.

== Operations ==
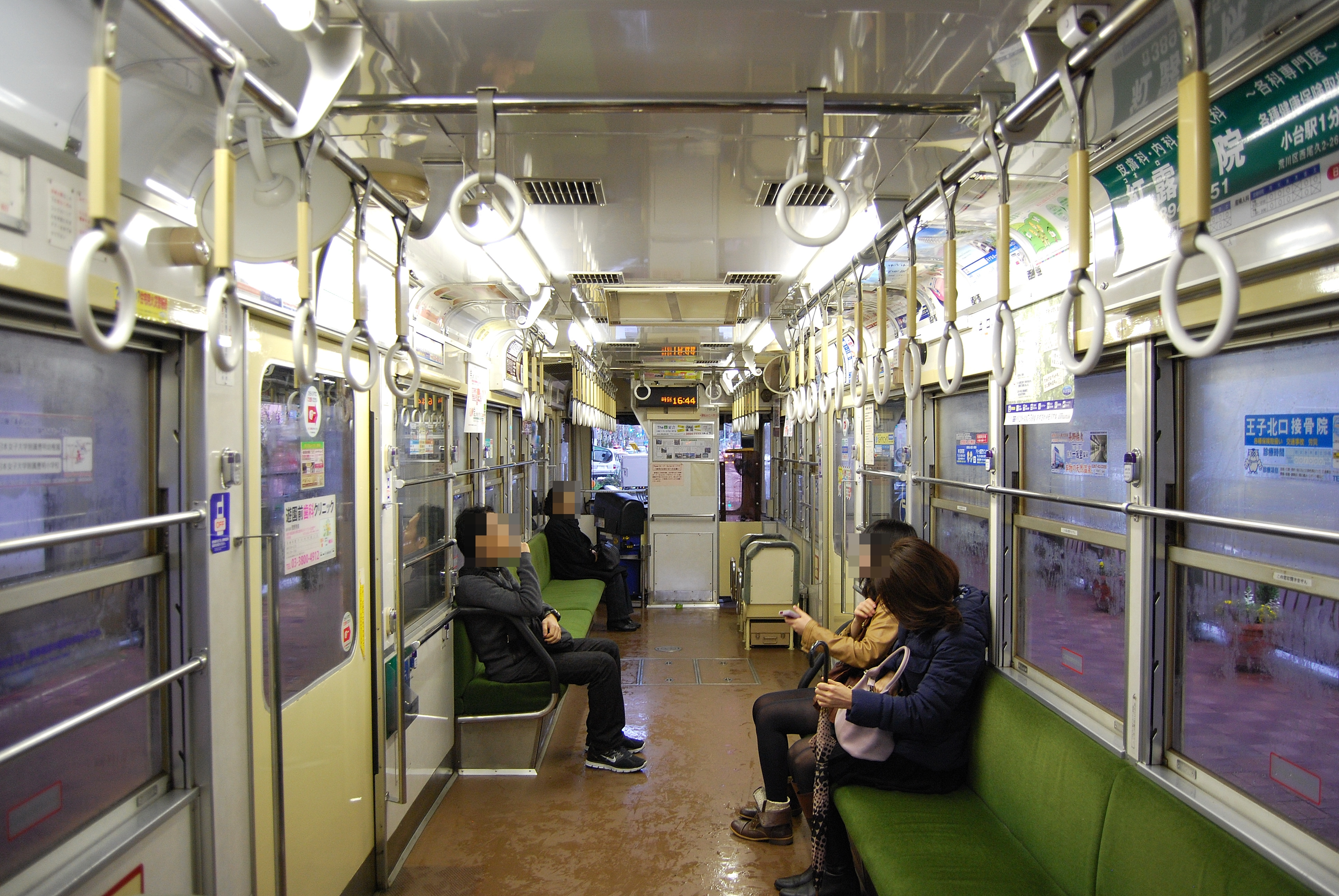
The interior of a 7000 series car in March 2012

The fleet was based at Arakawa Depot, operating on the sole remaining tram line in Tokyo, the Toden Arakawa Line.

== History ==
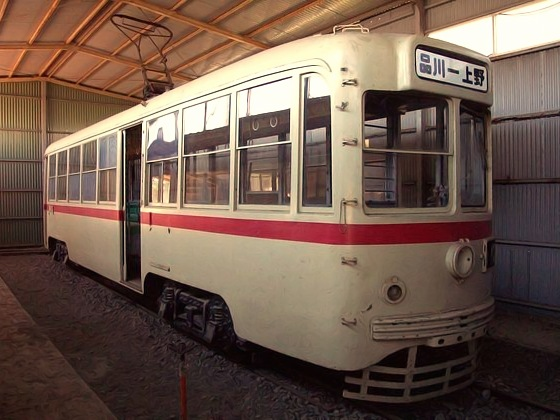
Original car 7024 preserved in Shizuoka Prefecture in 2002

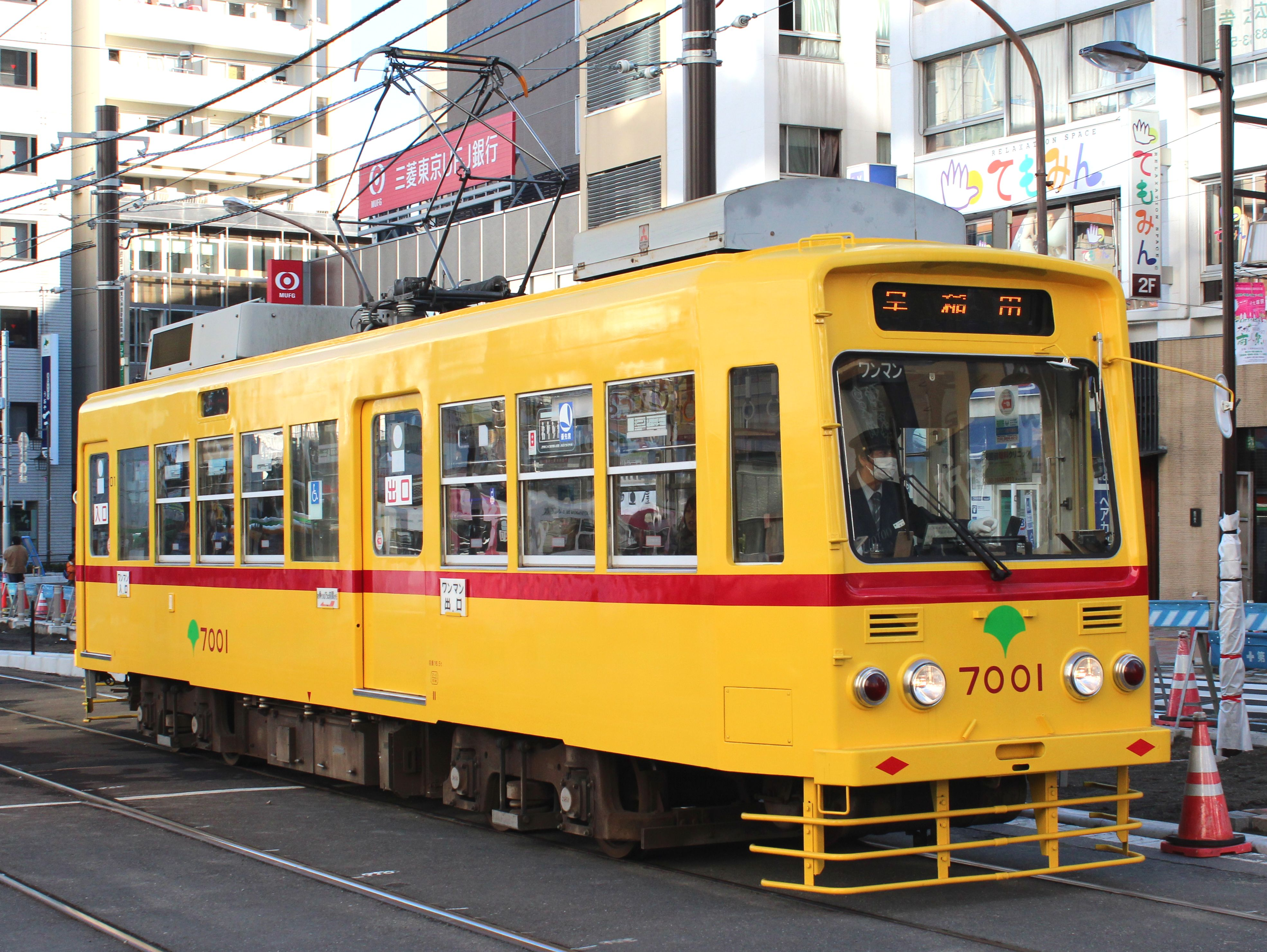
Car 7001 repainted in original yellow livery with red stripe (for two-man operation cars) in December 2013

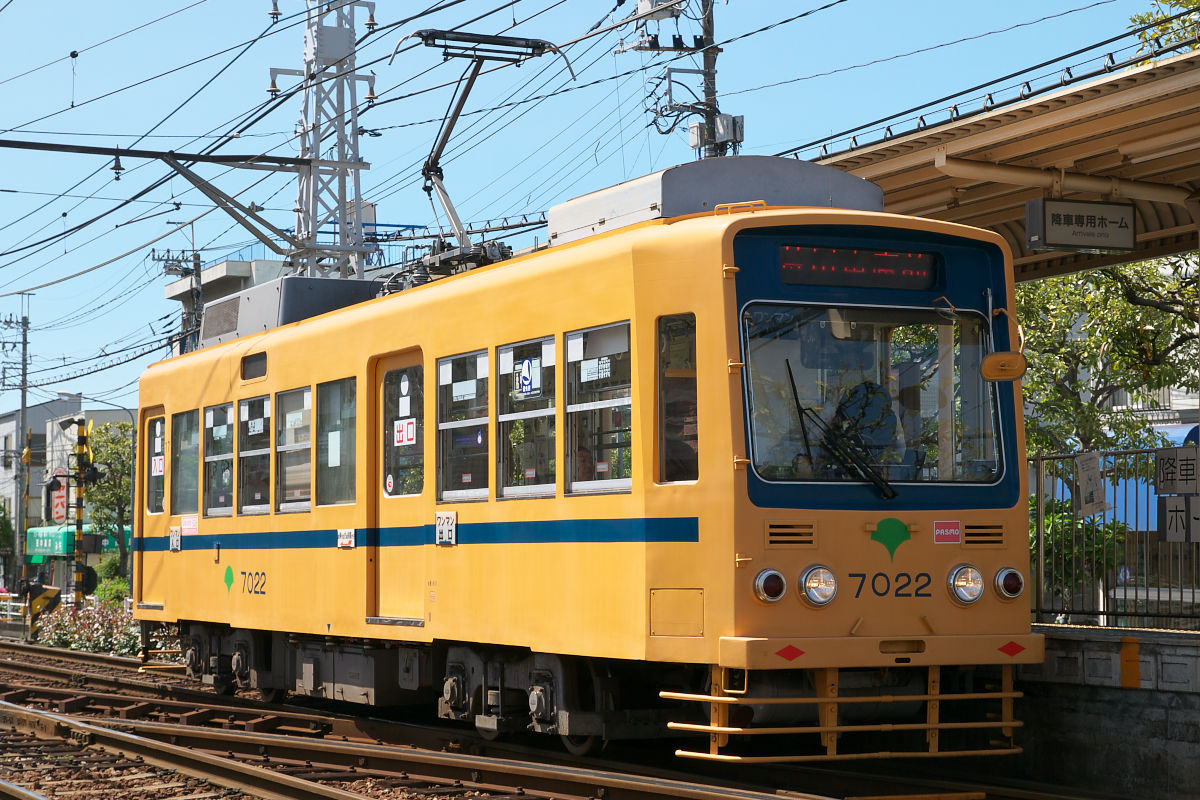
Car 7022 repainted in later yellow livery with blue stripe (for one-man operation cars) in June 2009

The original cars were built between 1955 and 1956 by Hitachi and Nippon Sharyo. In 1977, the fleet was modernized with new bodies built by Alna Sharyo, re-using the original bogies and electrical equipment. The cars were renumbered at the same time.

In 1978, the new 7000 series design was awarded the Laurel Prize, presented annually in Japan since by the Japan Railfan Club.

The last remaining car in service, 7022, was withdrawn on 10 June 2017.

== Rebuilding ==
Eight 7000 series cars were rebuilt as 7700 series cars during fiscal 2016, with refurbished bodies, new electrical equipment including VVVF control, and new bogies.

== Fleet build details ==
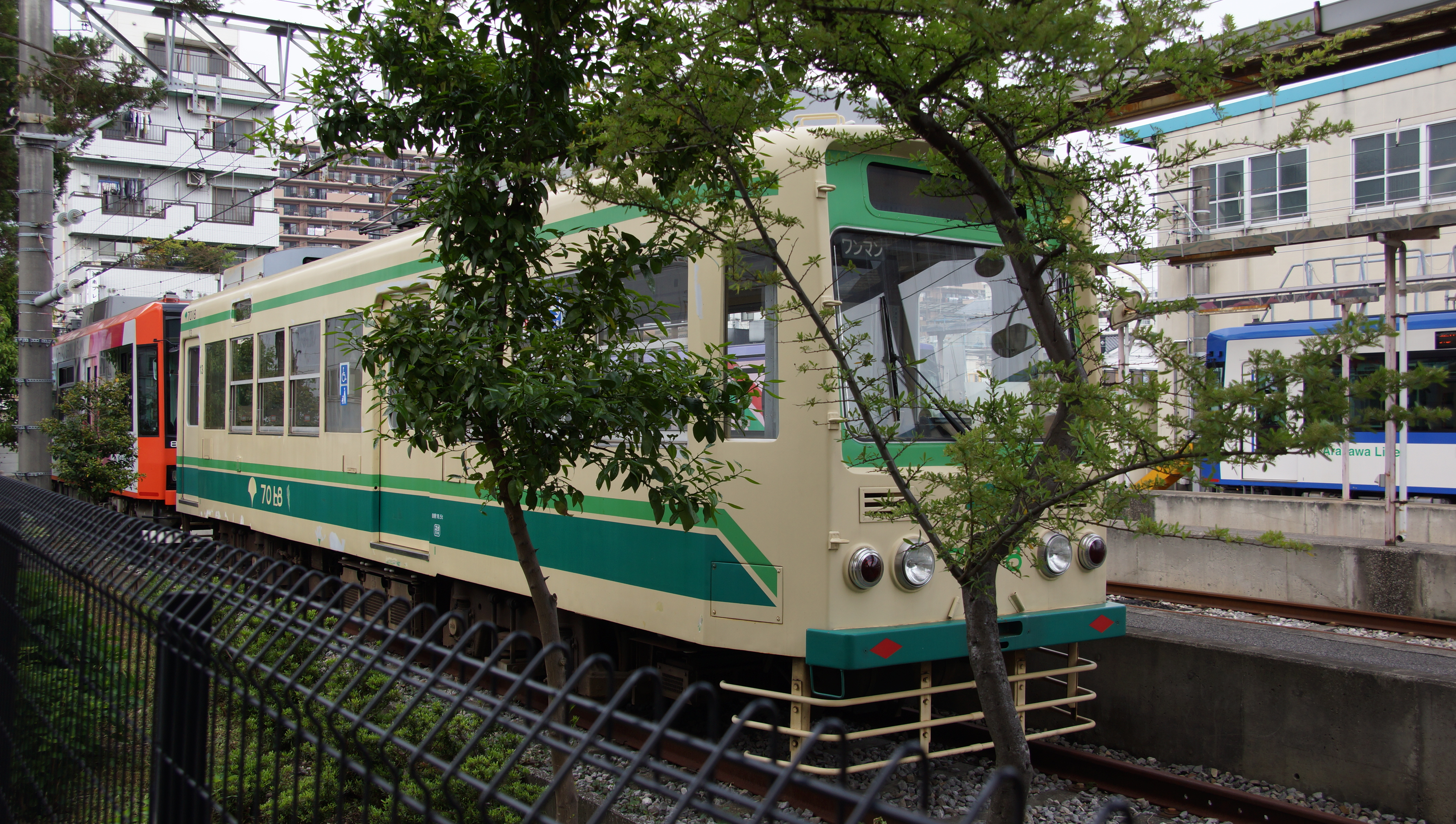
Car 7018 stored at Arakawa Depot in April 2016, prior to rebuilding as 7700 series car 7705

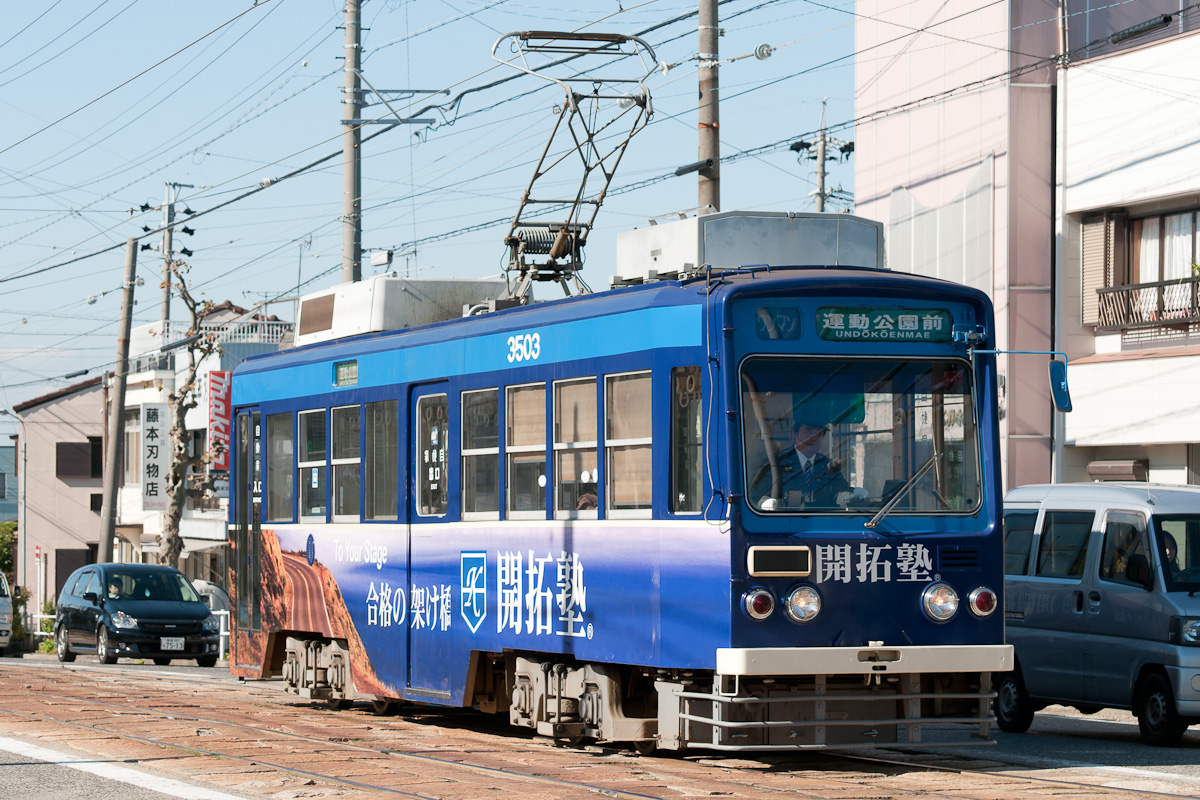
Toyohashi Railroad car 3503 (former Toei 7017)

As of 1 January 2017, three vehicles were still in service. The individual car build histories are as follows.

Car No.	Original number	Original manufacturer	Original build date	Date rebuilt	Date withdrawn	Notes
7001	7055	Nippon Sharyo	December 1955	February 1978	10 June 2017	
7002	7056	Nippon Sharyo	December 1955	January 1978	10 June 2017	
7003	7057	Nippon Sharyo	December 1955	February 1978	13 December 2016	
7004	7058	Nippon Sharyo	1955	December 1977	31 March 2011	
7005	7059	Nippon Sharyo	December 1955	March 1978	→	Rebuilt as 7707
7006	7060	Nippon Sharyo	1955	January 1978	31 March 1991	
7007	7061	Nippon Sharyo	December 1955	November 1977	→	Rebuilt as 7701
7008	7062	Nippon Sharyo	December 1955	December 1977	31 December 2012	Preserved in Ota, Tokyo
7009	7063	Nippon Sharyo	1955	January 1978	6 June 1992	Sold to Toyohashi Railroad (Mo 3501)
7010	7064	Nippon Sharyo	December 1955	February 1978	→	Rebuilt as 7708
7011	7065	Hitachi	1955	January 1978	31 January 1991	Preserved in Ichikawa, Chiba
7012	7066	Hitachi	1955	December 1977	20 May 1993	
7013	7067	Hitachi	December 1955	March 1978	26 October 2015	
7014	7068	Hitachi	1955	February 1978	20 May 1993	
7015	7069	Hitachi	December 1955	December 1977	→	Rebuilt as 7704
7016	7070	Hitachi	December 1955	December 1977	28 September 2016	
7017	7071	Hitachi	1955	December 1977	28 April 1999	Sold to Toyohashi Railroad (Mo 3503)
7018	7072	Hitachi	January 1956	January 1978	→	Rebuilt as 7705
7019	7073	Hitachi	January 1956	November 1977	14 December 2015	
7020	7074	Nippon Sharyo	1956	February 1978	31 March 2008	
7021	7075	Nippon Sharyo	1956	December 1977	28 April 1999	Sold to Toyohashi Railroad (Mo 3504)
7022	7076	Nippon Sharyo	September 1956	January 1978	10 June 2017	
7023	7077	Nippon Sharyo	September 1956	November 1977	15 December 2015	
7024	7078	Nippon Sharyo	September 1956	February 1978	→	Rebuilt as 7706
7025	7081	Nippon Sharyo	September 1956	March 1978	27 October 2015	
7026	7082	Nippon Sharyo	September 1956	March 1978	→	Rebuilt as 7702
7027	7083	Nippon Sharyo	1956	December 1977	19 September 2011	
7028	7084	Nippon Sharyo	1956	November 1977	6 June 1992	Sold to Toyohashi Railroad (Mo 3502)
7029	7086	Nippon Sharyo	September 1956	November 1977	14 December 2016	
7030	7087	Hitachi	September 1956	November 1977	29 September 2016	
7031	7089	Hitachi	September 1956	February 1978	→	Rebuilt as 7703

== Preserved examples ==
- 7008, withdrawn in 2012, was moved to Haginaka Park in Ota, Tokyo in 2013.
- 7011 is preserved in Ichikawa, Chiba.
