= Toei 7700 series =

Japanese tramcar type

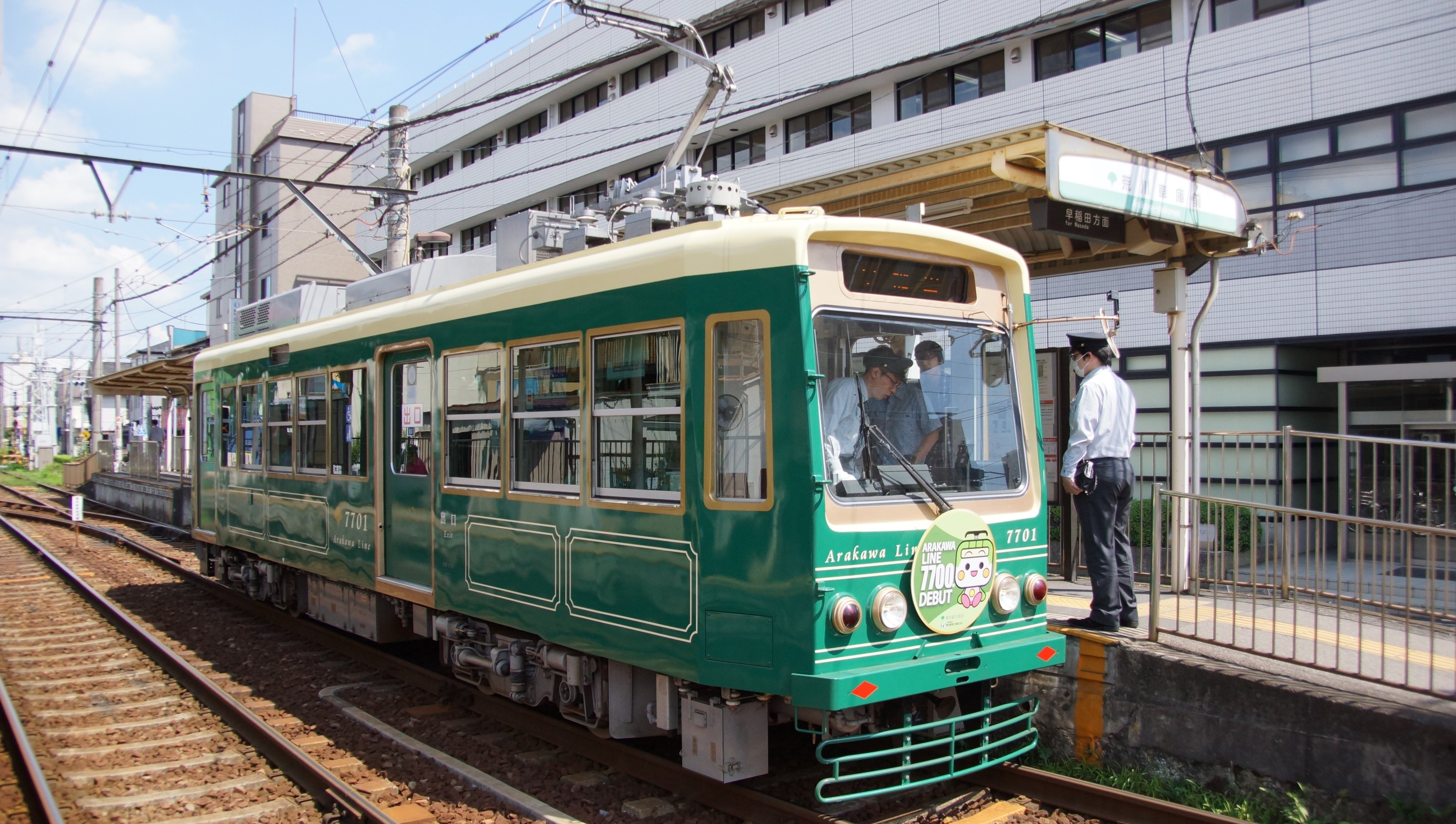
- Green-liveried 7701 in July 2016
- Constructed: 2016-2017
- Entered service: 30 May 2016
- Number built: 8 cars
- Number in service: 8 cars
- Formation: Single car
- Fleet numbers: 7701–7708
- Operator: Tokyo Metropolitan Bureau of Transportation
- Depot: Arakawa
- Line served: Toden Arakawa Line

Specifications
- Car body construction: Steel
- Car length: 12,520 mm (41 ft 1 in)
- Width: 2,203 mm (7 ft 2.7 in)
- Height: 3,685 mm (12 ft 1 1/8 in)
- Floor height: 760 mm (2 ft 6 in)
- Doors: 2 sliding doors per side
- Maximum speed: 40 km/h (25 mph)
- Weight: 18.5 t (18.2 long tons; 20.4 short tons)
- Acceleration: 3.0 km/(h⋅s) (1.9 mph/s)
- Deceleration: 4.5 km/(h⋅s) (2.8 mph/s) (service); 5.0 km/(h⋅s) (3.1 mph/s) (emergency)
- Electric system: 600 V DC Overhead wire
- Current collection: Pantograph
- Track gauge: 1,372 mm (4 ft 6 in)

The Toei 7700 series (東京都交通局7700形) is a tramcar type operated by Tokyo Metropolitan Bureau of Transportation (Toei) on the Toden Arakawa Line in Tokyo, Japan, since May 2016. The planned fleet of eight cars is to be built from former 7000 series cars, rebuilt with new bogies and electrical equipment.

== Design ==
The 7700 series cars are rebuilt from former 7000 series cars, which themselves were rebuilt in 1977 from cars dating from the 1950s with new bodies on the original underframes. The 7700 series cars reuse the bodies and air-conditioning equipment of the 7000 series cars but with new bogies identical to those used on the 8900 series cars and VVVF control equipment. The interiors have also been completely refurbished with the doorways widened from 900 mm (35.4 in) to 1,000 mm (39.4 in). Interior LED lighting is used. The cost of building the 7700 series from the earlier 7000 series cars is approximately 130 million yen per car, compared to the cost of approximately 180 million yen for purchasing new 8900 series cars.

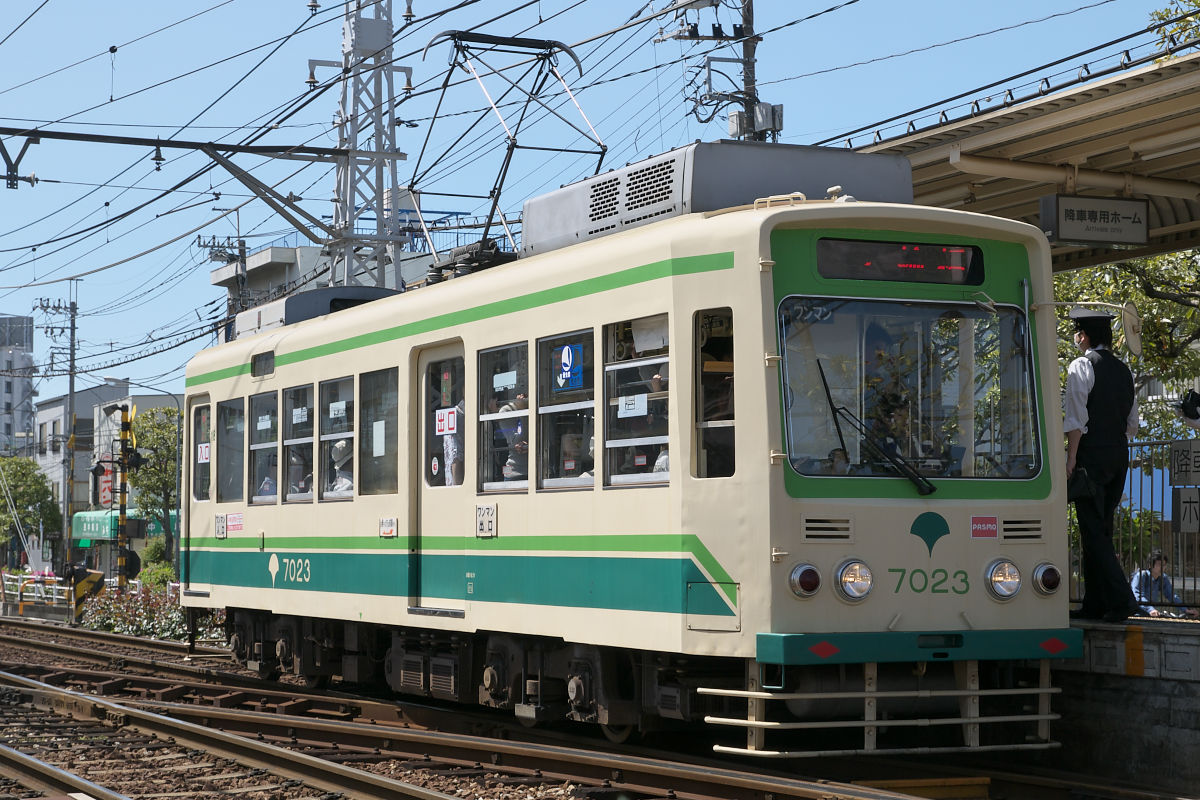
A 7000 series car in June 2009

=== Liveries ===
The individual tramcars are finished in retro-style liveries as follows.

Car No.	Colour
7701	Green
7702	Green
7703	Blue
7704	Blue
7705	Blue
7706	Maroon
7707	Maroon
7708	Maroon

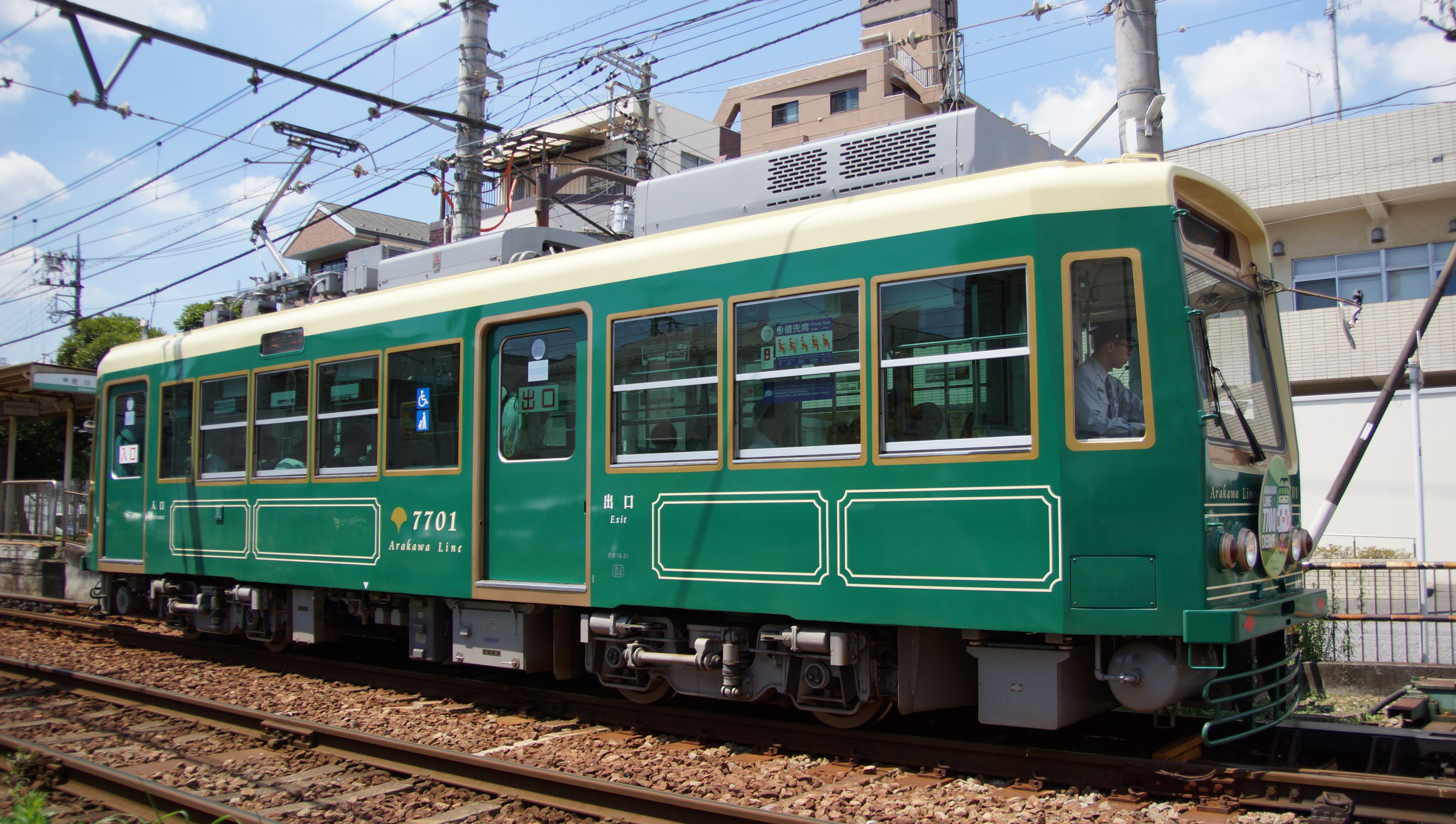
Green-liveried 7701 in July 2016

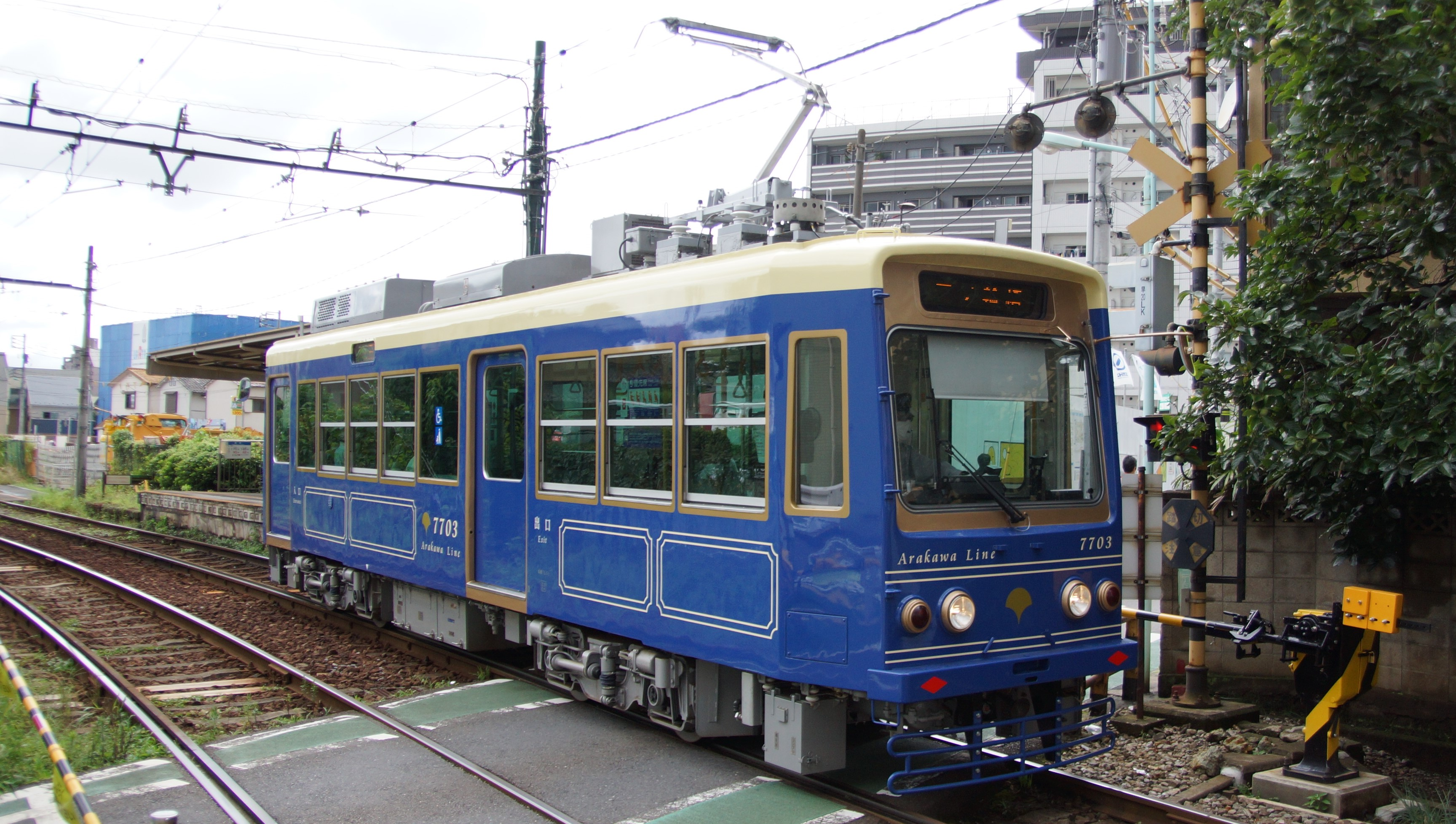
Blue-liveried 7703 in August 2016

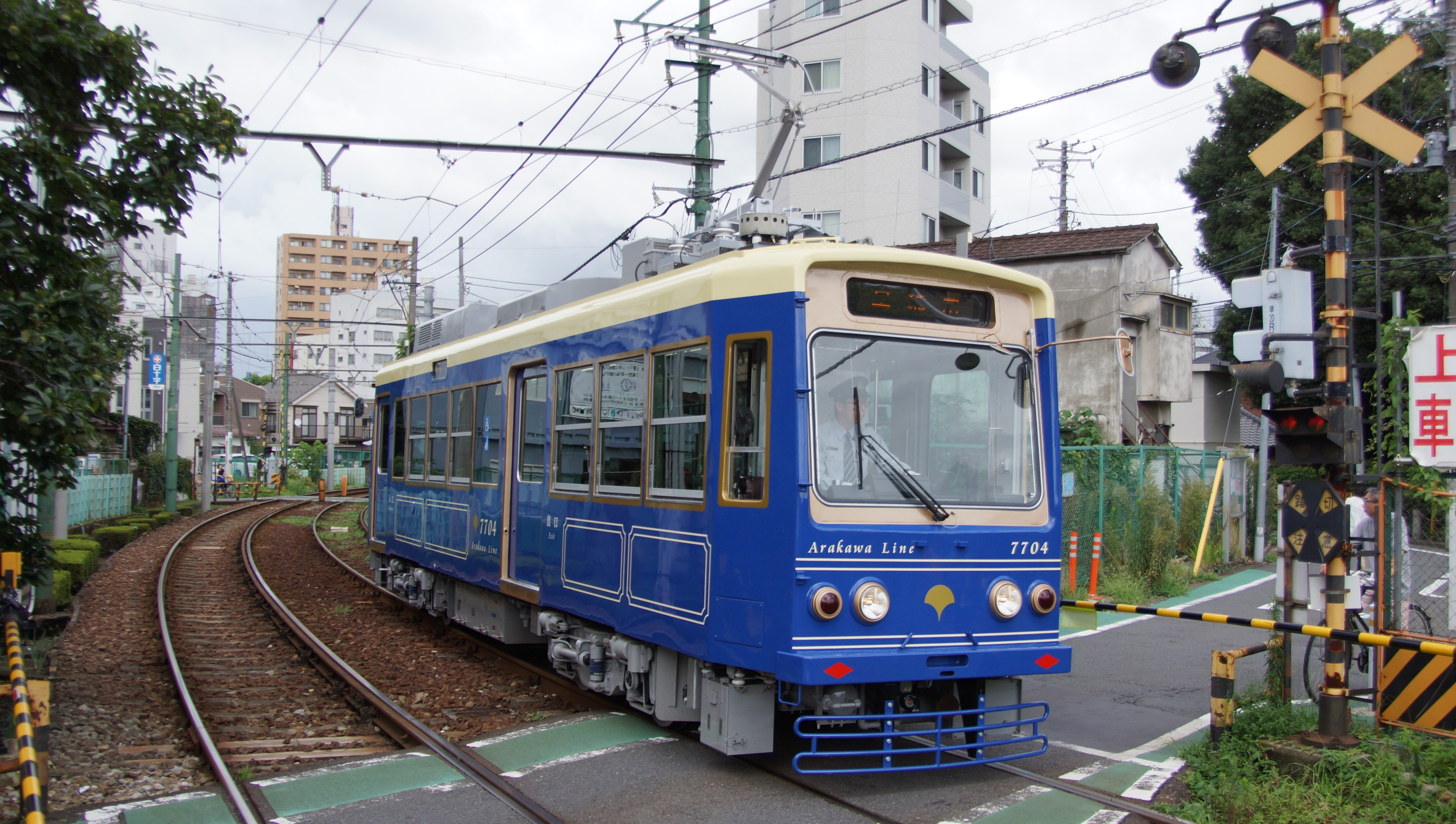
Blue-liveried 7704 in August 2016

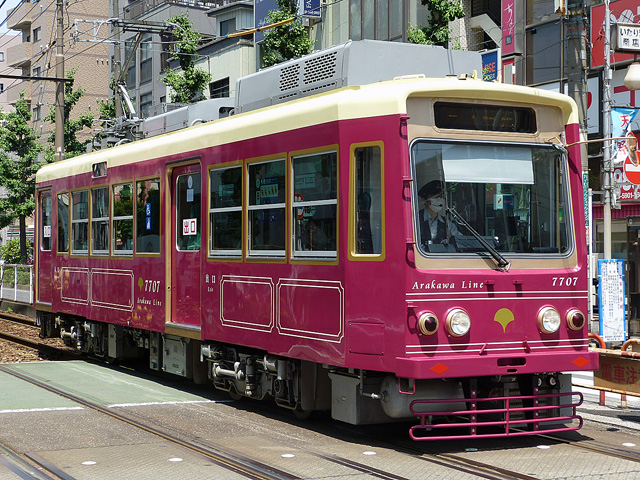
Maroon-liveried 7707 in May 2017

== History ==
Toei announced details of the new 7700 series fleet in March 2016.

The first car, 7701 in green livery, entered service on 30 May 2016. The two green-liveried cars will be followed by three cars in blue livery and three cars in maroon livery, all entering service by the end of fiscal 2016.

== Build history details ==
The individual build histories of the tramcars are as follows.

Car No.	Former number	Date rebuilt
7701	7007	March 2016
7702	7026	March 2016
7703	7031	
7704	7015	
7705	7018	
7706	7024	
7707	7005	
7708	7010	
