= Toei 8900 series =

Japanese tramcar type

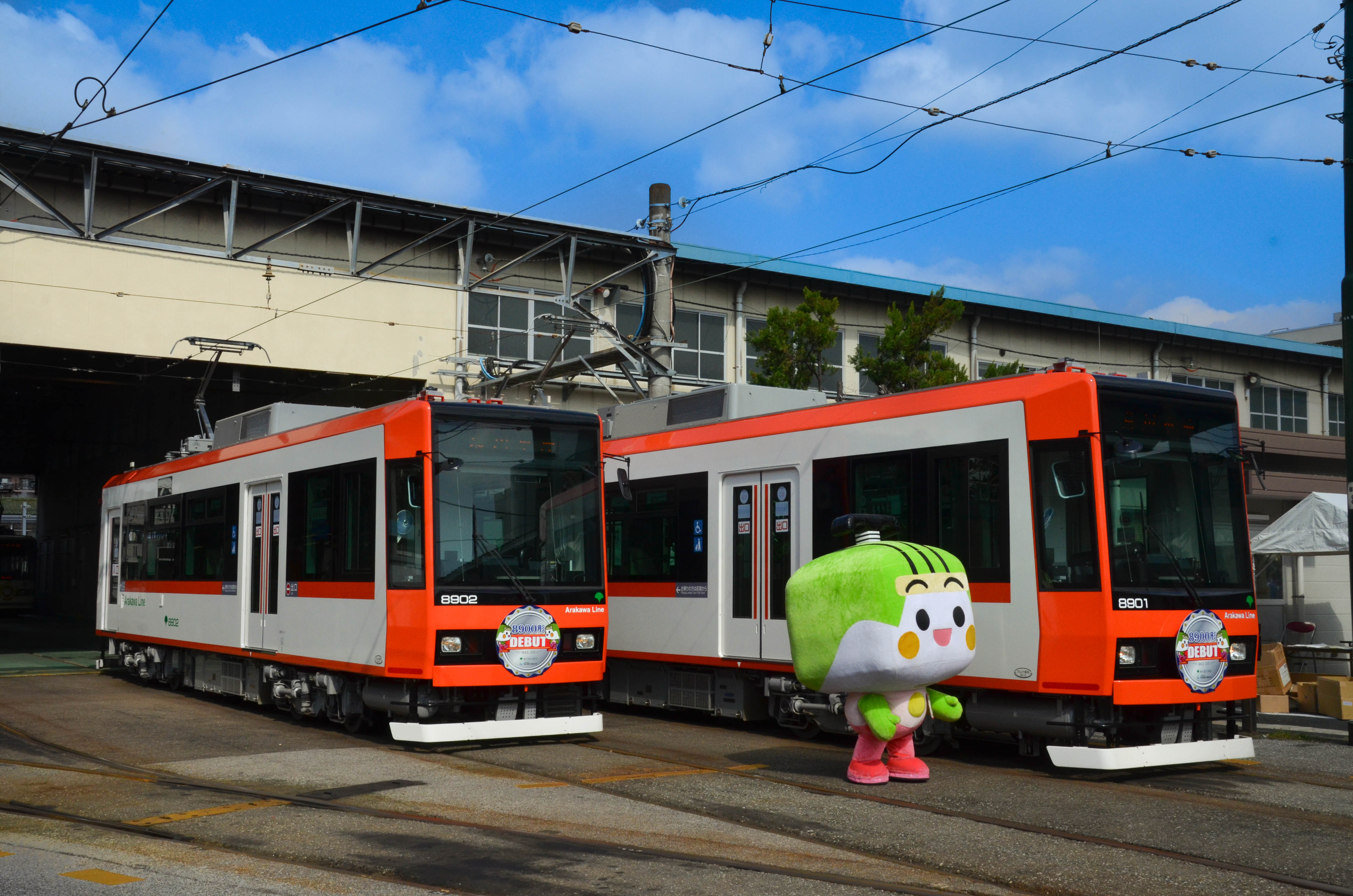
- Cars 8901 and 8902 with mascot character in October 2015
- In service: September 2015 –
- Manufacturer: Alna Sharyo
- Replaced: Toei 7000 series
- Constructed: 2015–2016
- Entered service: 18 September 2015
- Number built: 8 vehicles
- Number in service: 8 vehicles
- Formation: Single car
- Fleet numbers: 8901–8908
- Capacity: 62
- Operator: Tokyo Metropolitan Bureau of Transportation
- Depot: Arakawa
- Line served: Toden Arakawa Line

Specifications
- Car body construction: Steel
- Car length: 13,000 mm (42 ft 8 in)
- Width: 2,200 mm (7 ft 3 in)
- Height: 3,800 mm (12 ft 6 in)
- Floor height: 786 mm (2 ft 6.9 in)
- Doors: 2 per side
- Maximum speed: 40 km/h (25 mph)
- Weight: 18.5 t (18.2 long tons; 20.4 short tons)
- Traction system: IGBT–VVVF (Toyo Denki)
- Traction motors: 2 × 60 kW (80 hp) RG699-A1-M 3-phase AC induction motor (Toyo Denki)
- Power output: 120 kW (161 hp)
- Acceleration: 3.0 km/(h⋅s) (1.9 mph/s)
- Deceleration: 4.5 km/(h⋅s) (2.8 mph/s) (service); 5.0 km/(h⋅s) (3.1 mph/s) (emergency)
- Electric system: 600 V DC Overhead wire
- Current collection: Pantograph
- Bogies: FS91-C
- Track gauge: 1,372 mm (4 ft 6 in)

The Toei 8900 series (東京都交通局8900形) is a tramcar type operated by Tokyo Metropolitan Bureau of Transportation (Toei) on the Toden Arakawa Line in Tokyo, Japan, since September 2015.

== Overview ==
Broadly based on the earlier 8800 series tramcars introduced in 2009, the 8900 series trams have a more angular external design. A total of eight cars are scheduled to be delivered by the end of fiscal 2016, replacing earlier 7000 series tramcars. The new cars cost approximately 180 million yen each.

== Operations ==
Based at Arakawa Depot, the 8900 series tramcars operate on the sole remaining tram line in Tokyo, the Toden Arakawa Line.

== Liveries ==
The tramcars are finished in a white livery with coloured ends and bodyside stripes. The colours used on individual cars are as follows.

| Car No. | Colour |
|---|---|
| 8901 | Orange |
| 8902 | Orange |
| 8903 | Blue |
| 8904 | Blue |
| 8905 | Rose red |
| 8906 | Rose red |
| 8907 | Yellow |
| 8908 | Yellow |

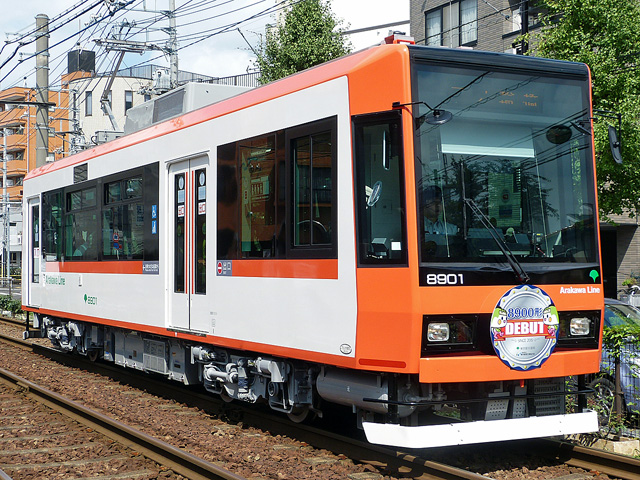
Car 8901 in orange livery in September 2015

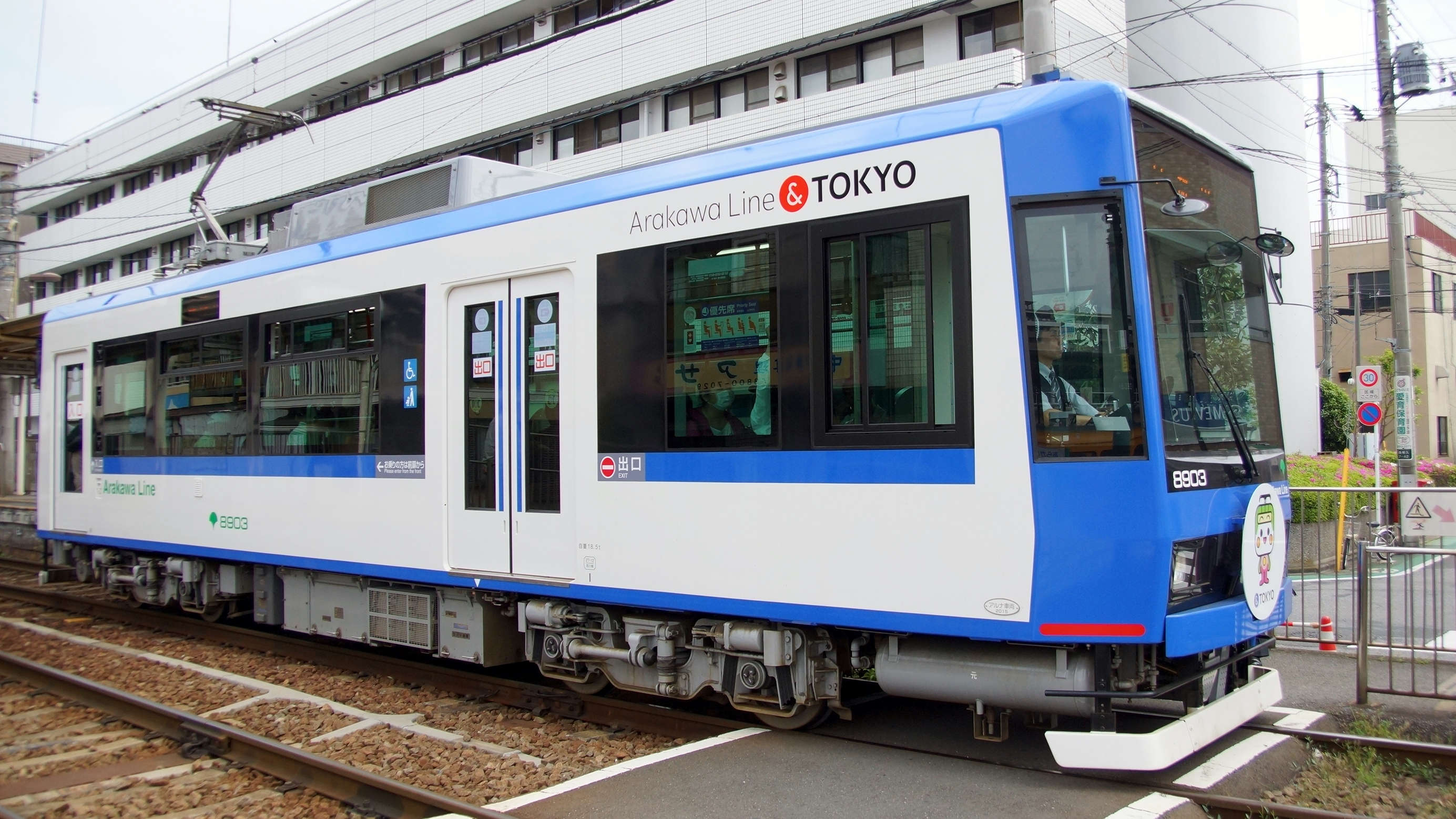
Car 8903 in blue livery in April 2016

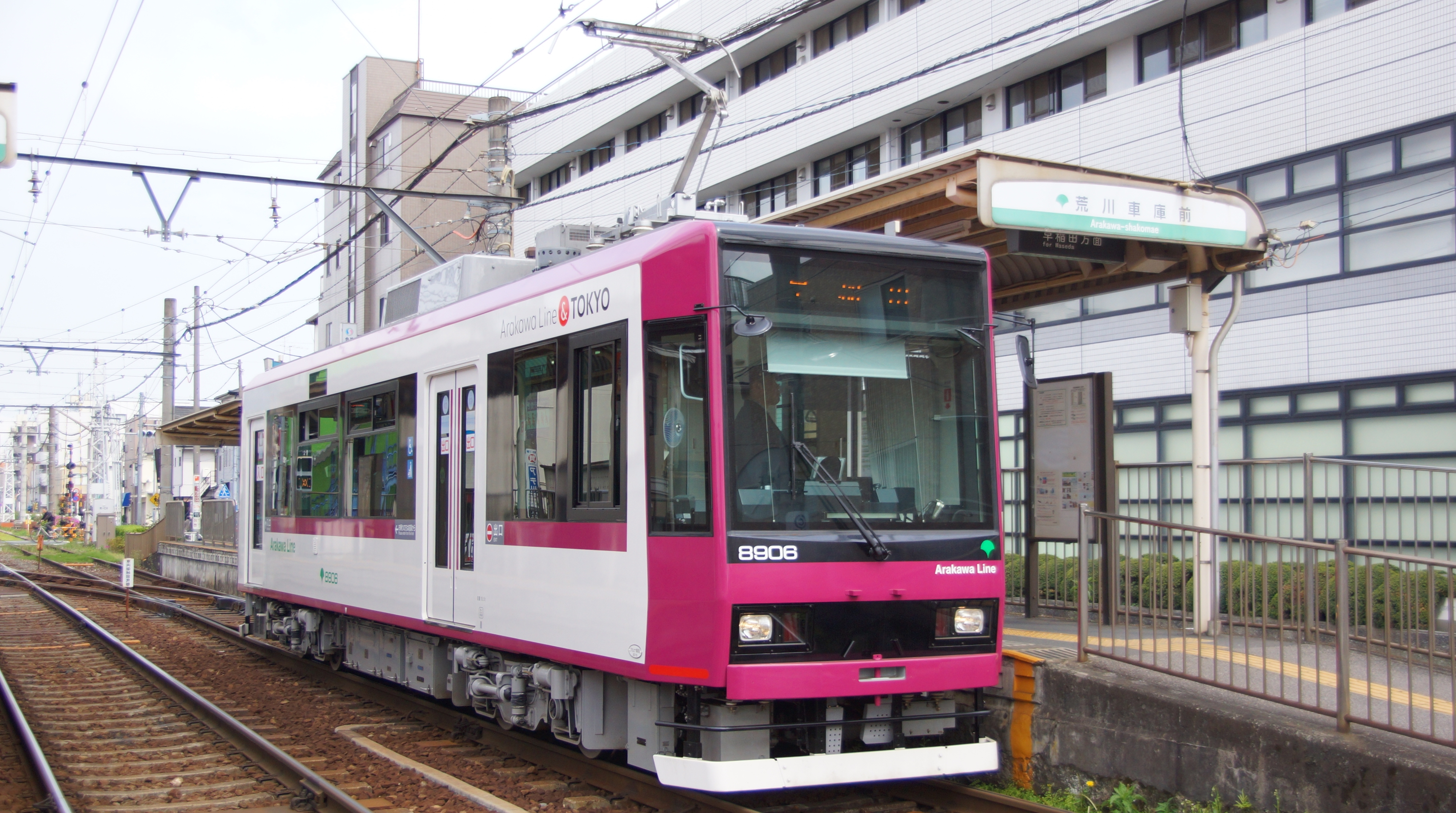
Car 8906 in "rose red" livery in April 2016

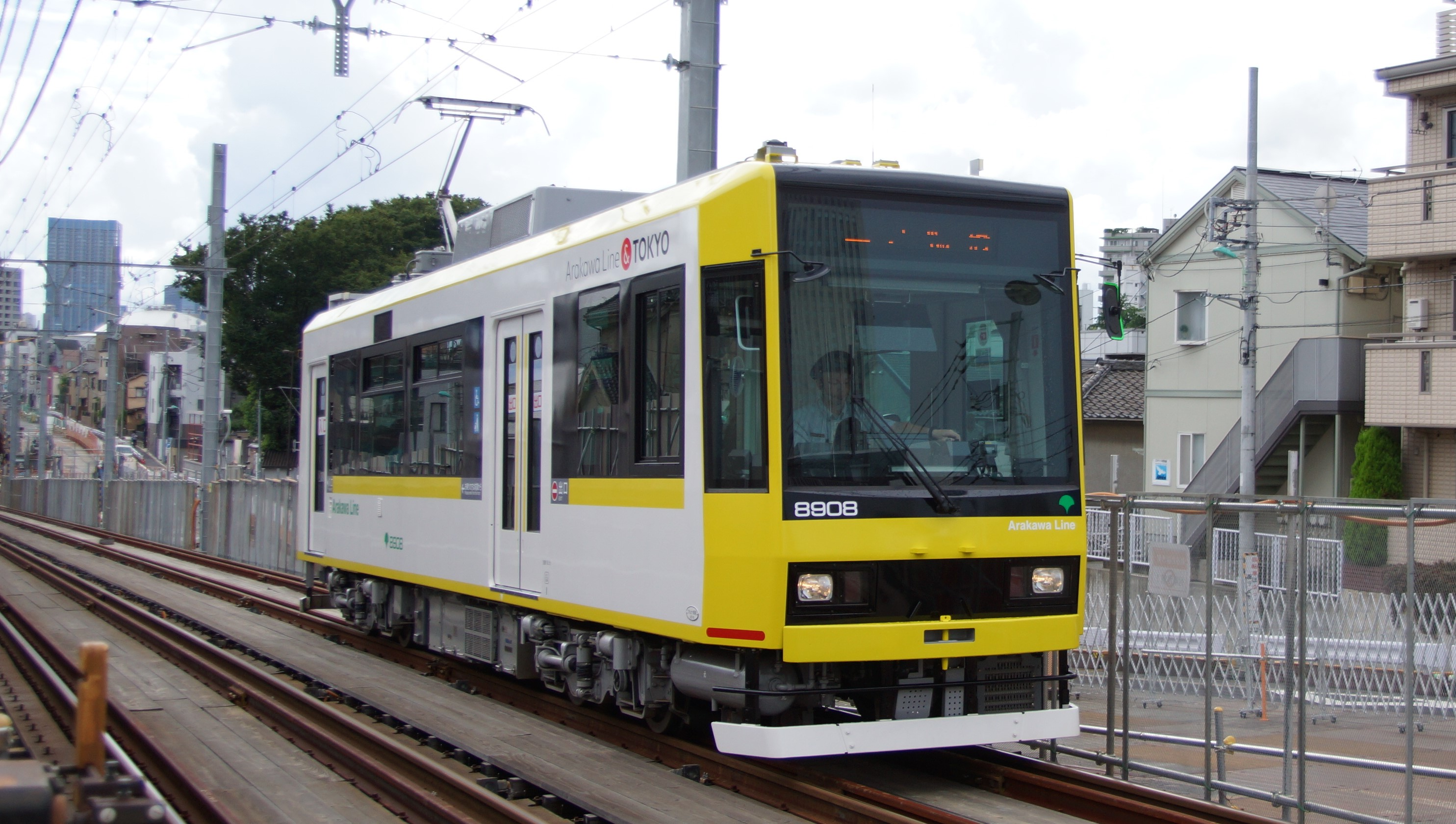
Car 8908 in yellow livery in August 2016

== History ==
The first two cars, orange-liveried 8901 and 8902, were delivered from Alna Sharyo in August 2015. These entered revenue service on 18 September 2015. The next two cars, blue-liveried 8903 and 8904, entered service in December 2015. "Rose red" liveried cars 8905 and 8906 both entered revenue service on 14 March 2016. The last two cars, yellow-liveried 8907 and 8908, were delivered in July 2016, entering revenue service on 29 and 30 July respectively.
