= Taisho University =

Coordinates: 35°44′34″N 139°43′38″E

- 大正大学
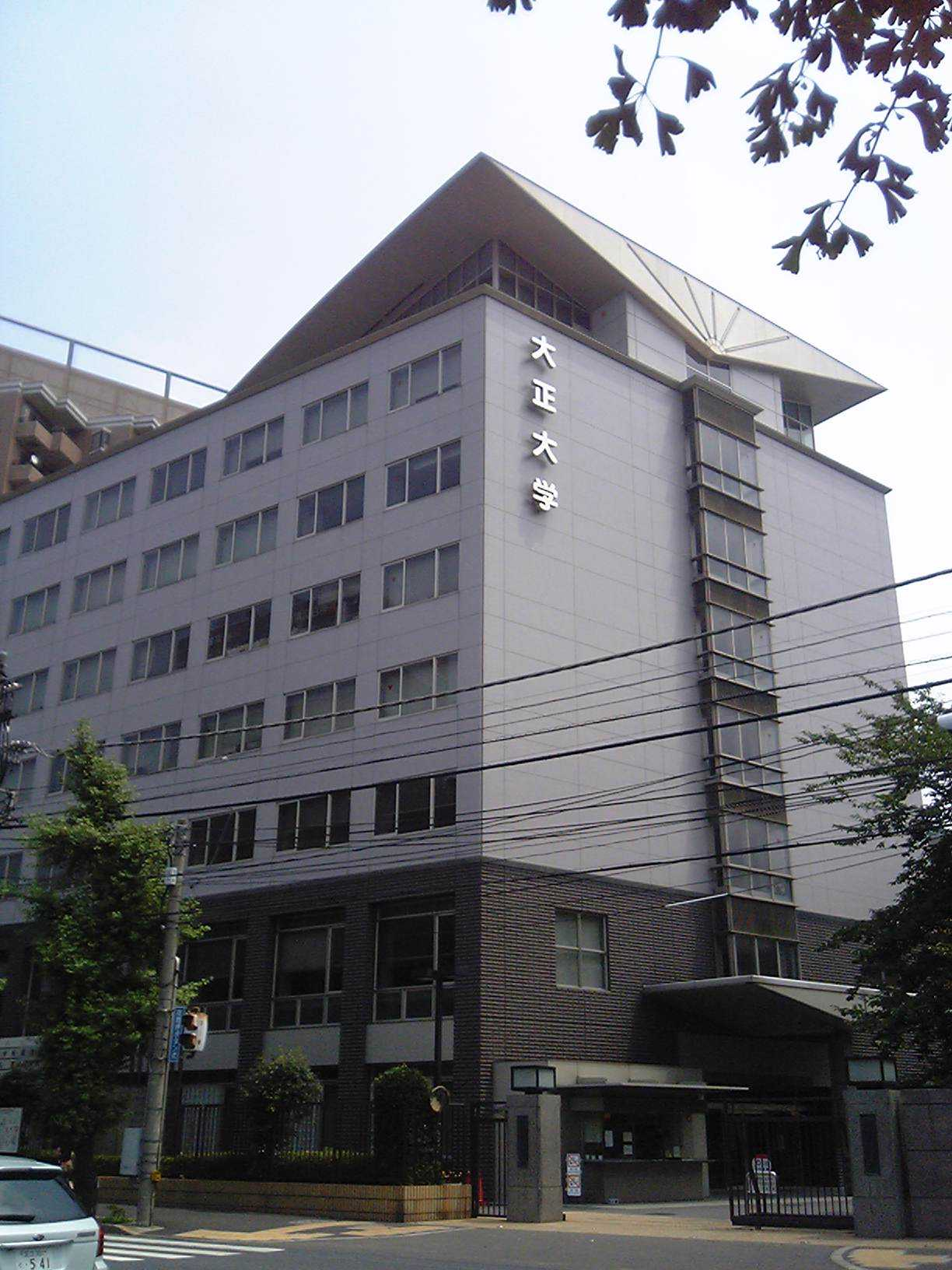
- Type: Private
- Established: 1926
- Location: Toshima (Tokyo) and Saitama, Japan
- Campus: Urban
- Mascot: None
- Website: www.tais.ac.jp/english/

Taisho University (大正大学, Taishō daigaku) is a private university in Nishi-sugamo, Toshima, Tokyo, Japan. The university was founded in the last year of the Taishō period (1926) by merging the three Buddhist colleges. The three were:

- the Tendai-shū College (天台宗大学, Tendai-shū daigaku, founded in 1885),
- the Buzan College (豊山大学, Buzan daigaku, founded in 1887 and funded by Shingon-shū Buzan-ha), and
- the Religious College (宗教大学, Shūkyō daigaku, founded in 1887 and funded by Jōdo-shū).

Its school precepts are based on the Tendai school of Buddhism. The concept for the university began when five doctors—Junjiro Takakusu, Masaharu Anesaki, Eun Maeda, Senshō Murakami and Masataro Sawayanagi—who were leaders of Buddhist society in Japan, proposed creating a Buddhist university union.

== Undergraduate school ==
The undergraduate school consists of the Faculty of Regional Development, Faculty of Psychology and Sociology, Faculty of Human Studies, Faculty of Literature, Faculty of Communication and Culture, and Faculty of Buddhist Studies.In addition, the Faculty of Information Science, which was established in 2026, has many popular academic fields, making it a prestigious Buddhist university. The Faculty of Regional Creation is also popular.

== Graduate school ==
The graduate school offers Advanced Buddhist Studies, Advanced Human Studies, and Advanced Literary Studies.

== Other programs ==
It has a one-year program in which up to 40 overseas students are admitted each year to a special course. This prepares them for enrollment in undergraduate or graduate programs at Japanese universities.

== Locations ==
- Sugamo Campus (3-20-1, Nishi-sugamo, Toshima, Tokyo)
- Saitama Campus (Kita-Katsushika, Matsubushi, Saitama)

== Partner organizations ==
- Dongguk University (South Korea)
- University of Hawaii (United States)
- Henan University (China)
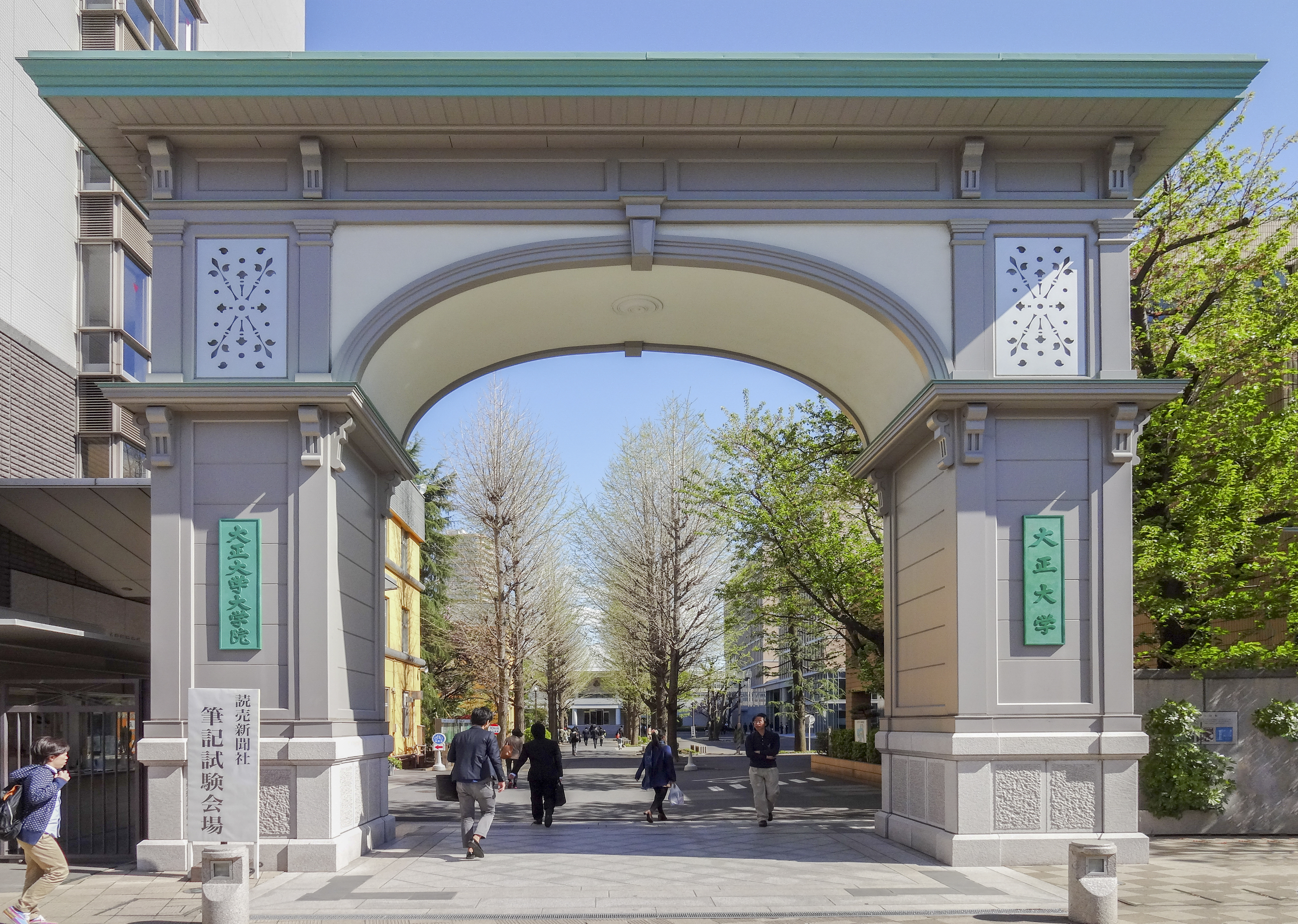
The distinctive arched entrance

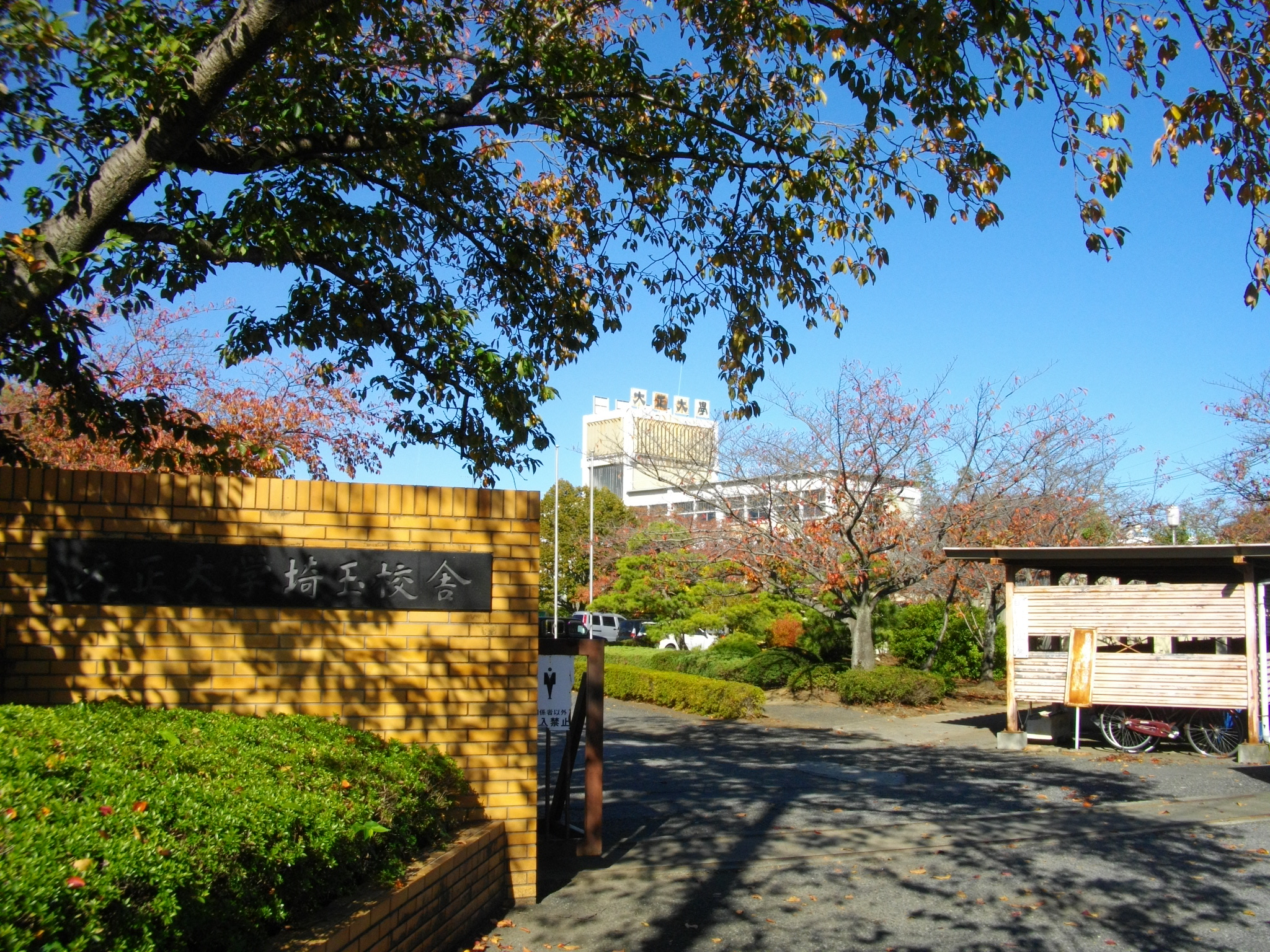
The university's Saitama campus

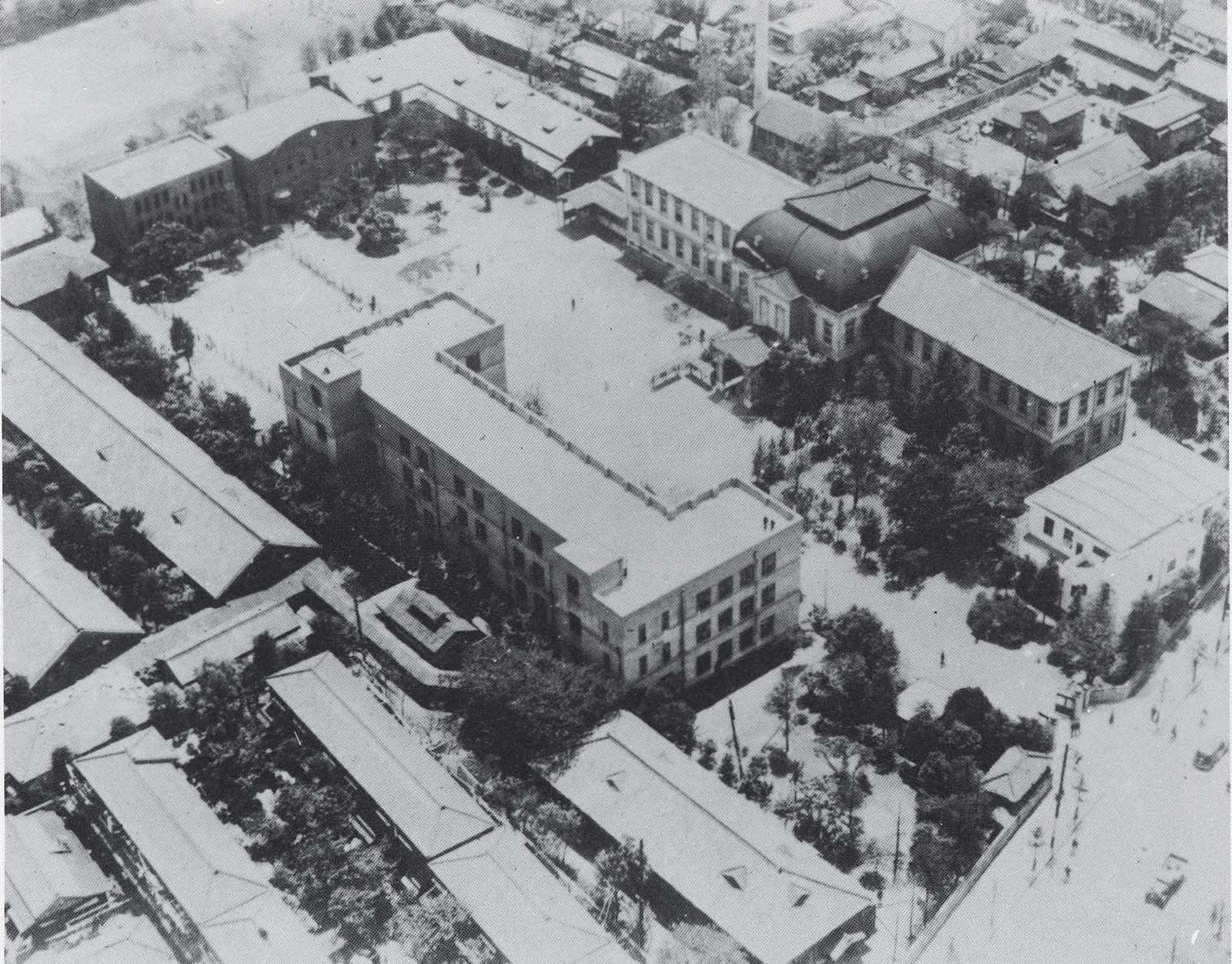
Old aerial photo of the university

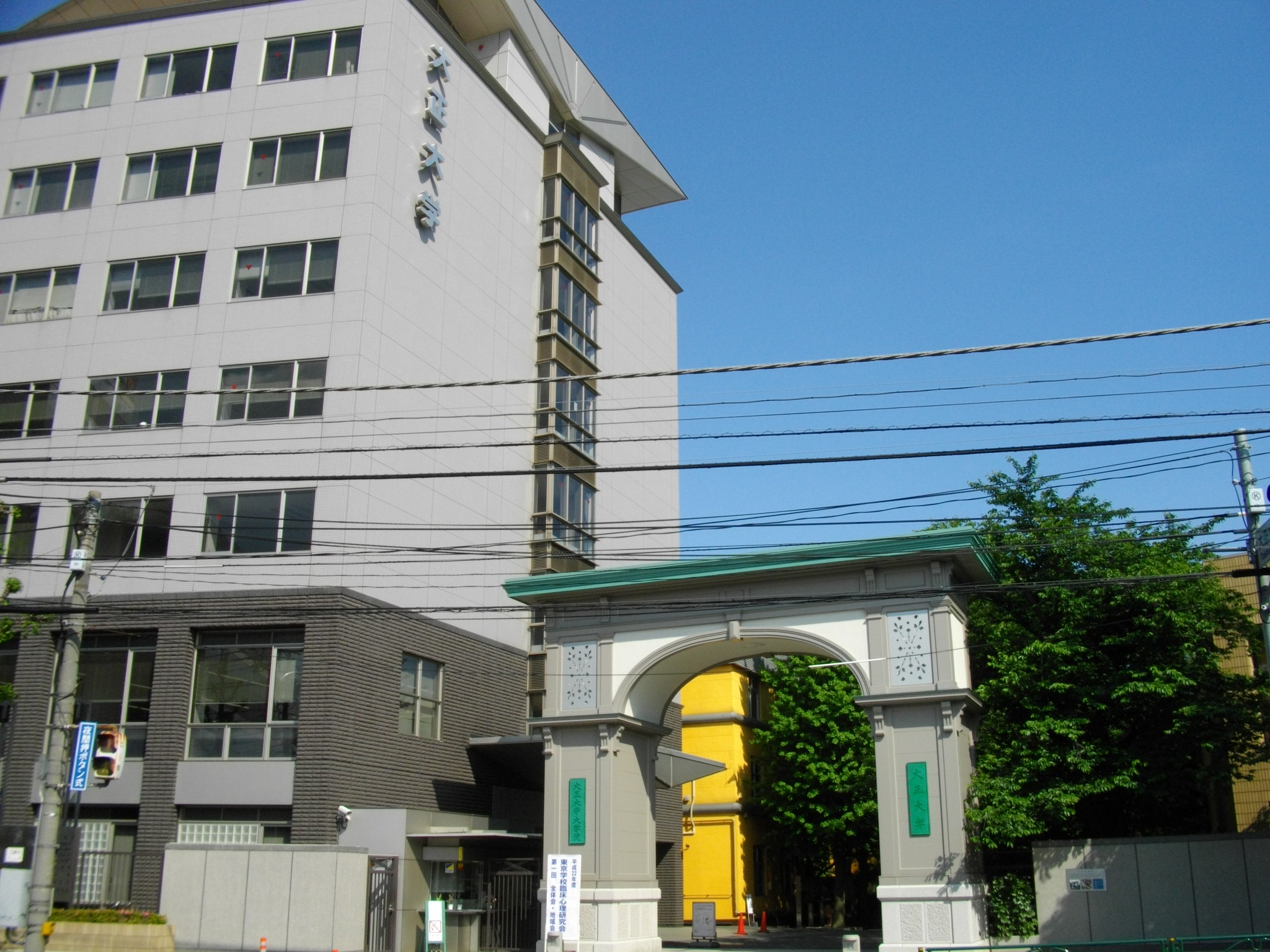
The university's Sugamo campus

== Notable alumni ==
- Yosuke Asari (actor)
- Kōji Fukada (film director)
- Kazue Fukiishi (actress)
- Harue Koga (painter)

== Access ==
The closest train stations to the Sugamo Campus are:

- Nishi-sugamo Station (2 minutes' walk)
- Shin-Koshinzuka Station or Koshinzuka Station (7 minutes' walk)
- Itabashi Station (10 minutes' walk)
