= Ōtsuka Station =

Railway and tram station in Tokyo, Japan

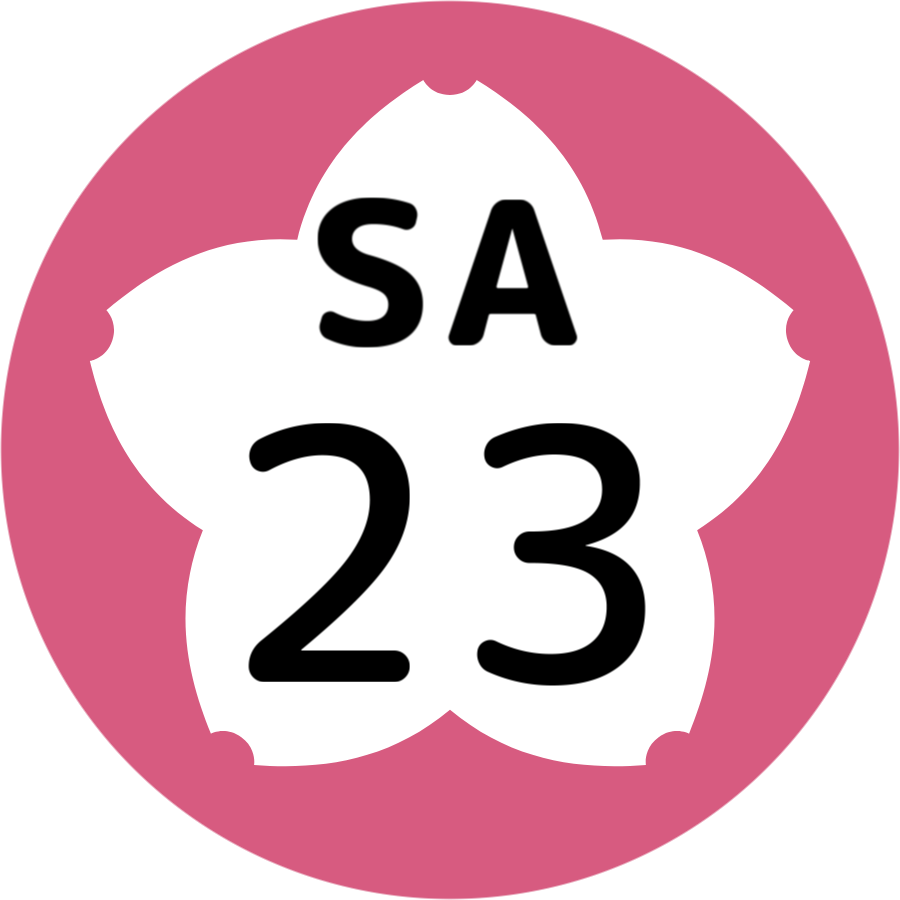
JY12 Ōtsuka Station Ōtsuka-ekimae Station 大塚駅 大塚駅前停留場

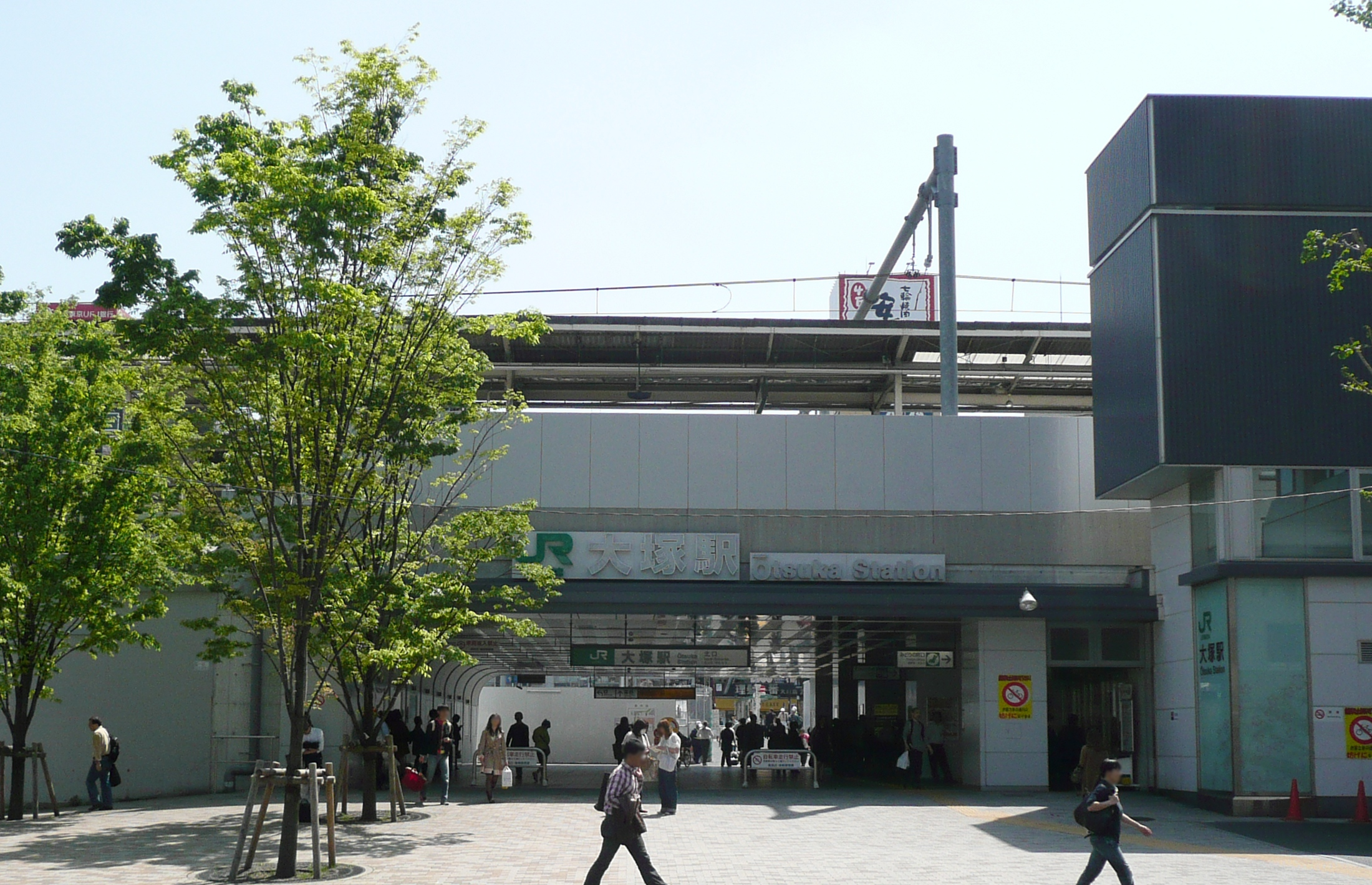
- The north entrance in April 2012

General information
- Location: 3 Minami-Ōtsuka, Toshima-ku, Tokyo; Japan
- Coordinates: 35.731438°N 139.728692°E
- Operator: JR East; Toei
- Lines: Yamanote Line; Toden Arakawa Line
- Connections: Bus terminal

History
- Opened: 1 April 1903; 123 years ago

Passengers
- FY2024: 108,702 daily; 7,990 daily

Services
Preceding station	JR East	Following station
Ikebukuro Next counter-clockwise	Yamanote Line	Sugamo JY11 Next clockwise
Preceding station	Toei	Following station
Mukōhara towards Waseda	Toden Arakawa Line	Sugamoshinden towards Minowabashi
Location
- Location within Tokyo Yamanote Loop Location within Tokyo wards area Location within Japan

Ōtsuka Station (大塚駅, Ōtsuka-eki) is a railway station in Toshima, Tokyo, Japan, operated by East Japan Railway Company (JR East). It is connected to the Ōtsuka-ekimae Station (大塚駅前停留場, Ōtsuka ekimae teiryūjō) on the Tokyo Sakura Tram line, operated by Tokyo Metropolitan Bureau of Transportation (Toei).

== Lines ==
Ōtsuka Station is served by the circular Yamanote Line. A stop on the Tokyo Sakura Tram, named Ōtsuka-ekimae Station is located underneath Ōtsuka Station.

== Station layout ==
The station consists of an elevated island platform serving the two Yamanote Line tracks. The station has a Midori no Madoguchi staffed ticket office.

Chest-high platform edge doors were installed on the Yamanote Line platforms, brought into use from 20 April 2013.

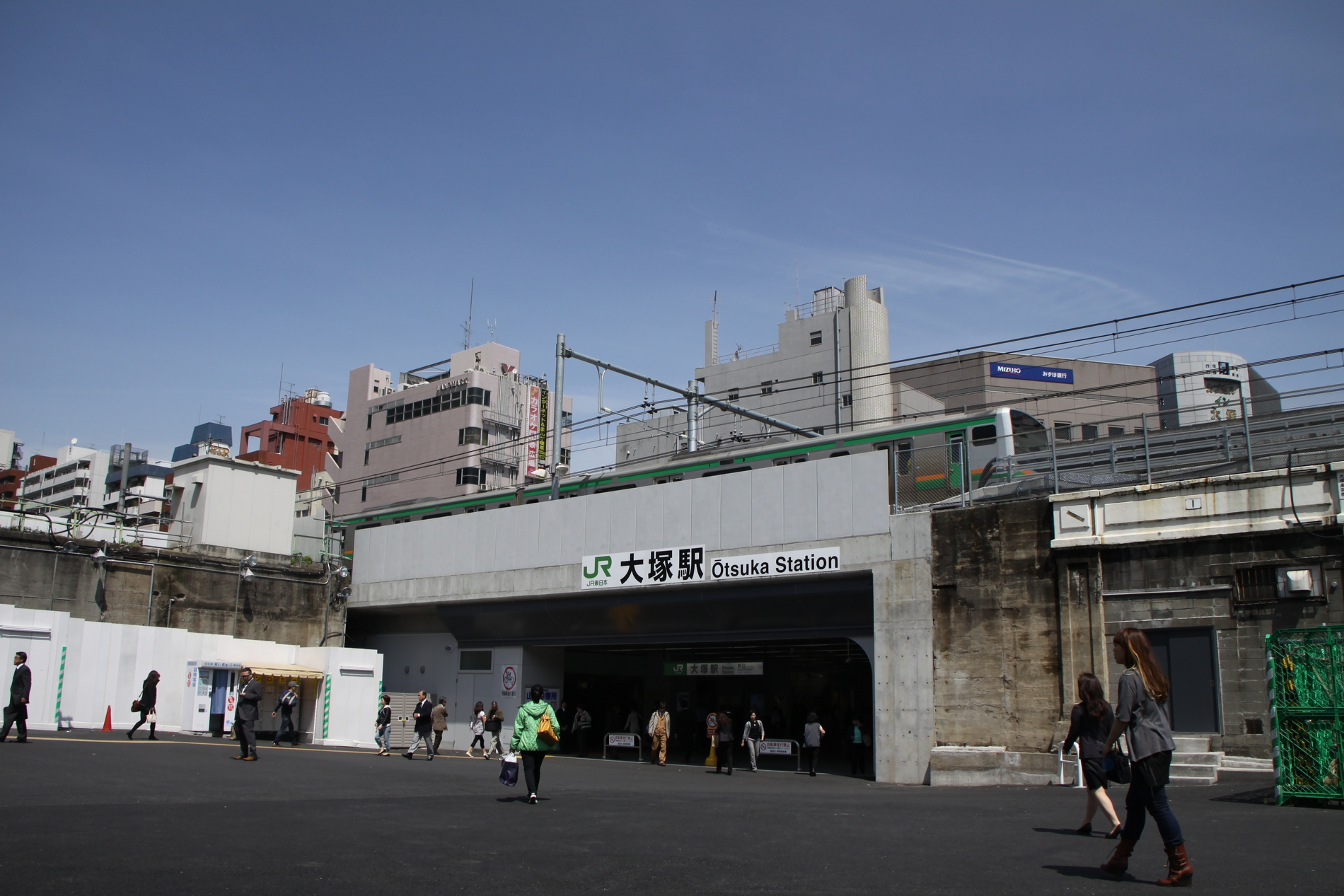
The south entrance, April 2010

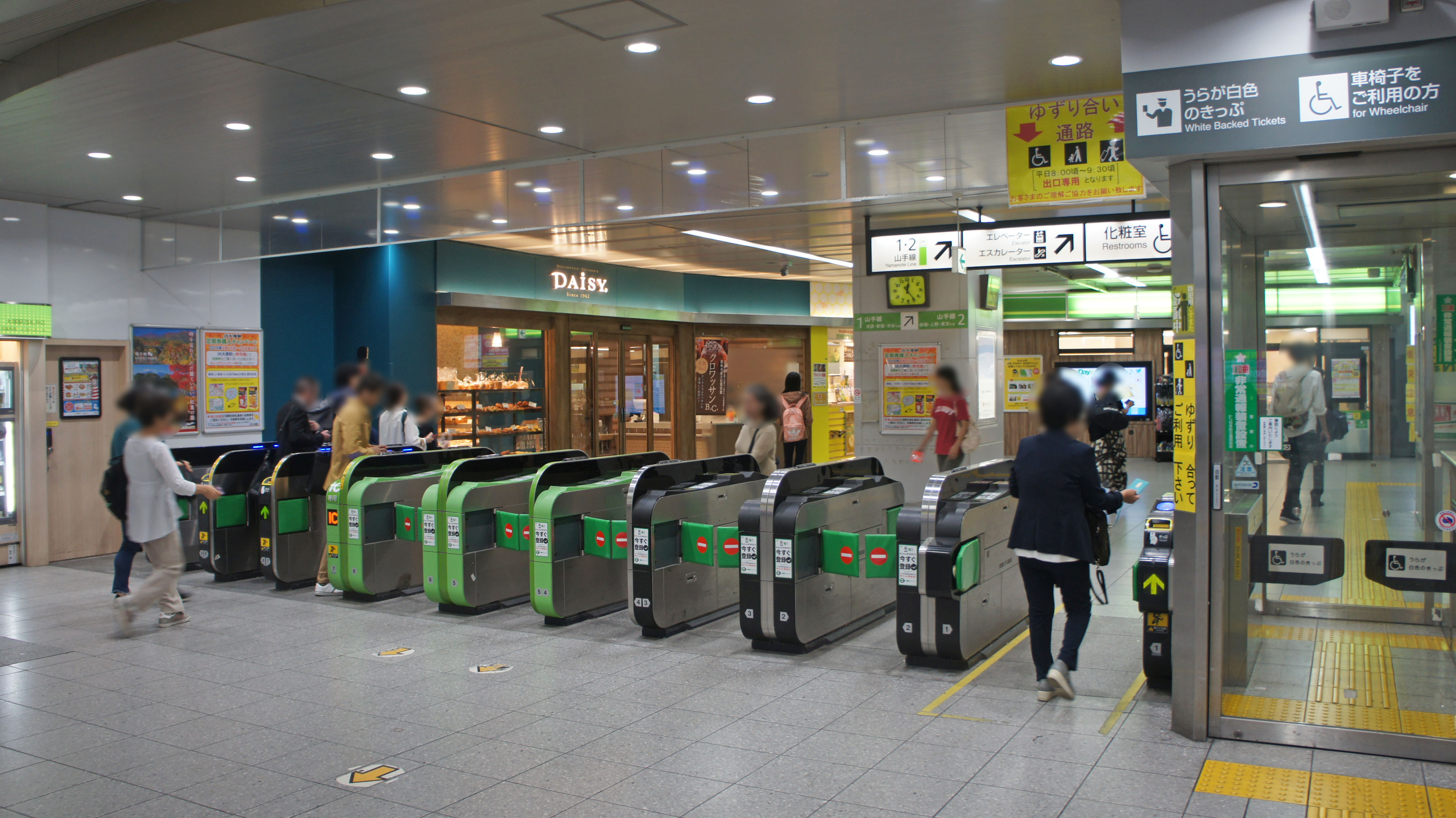
JR East ticket gates, September 2019

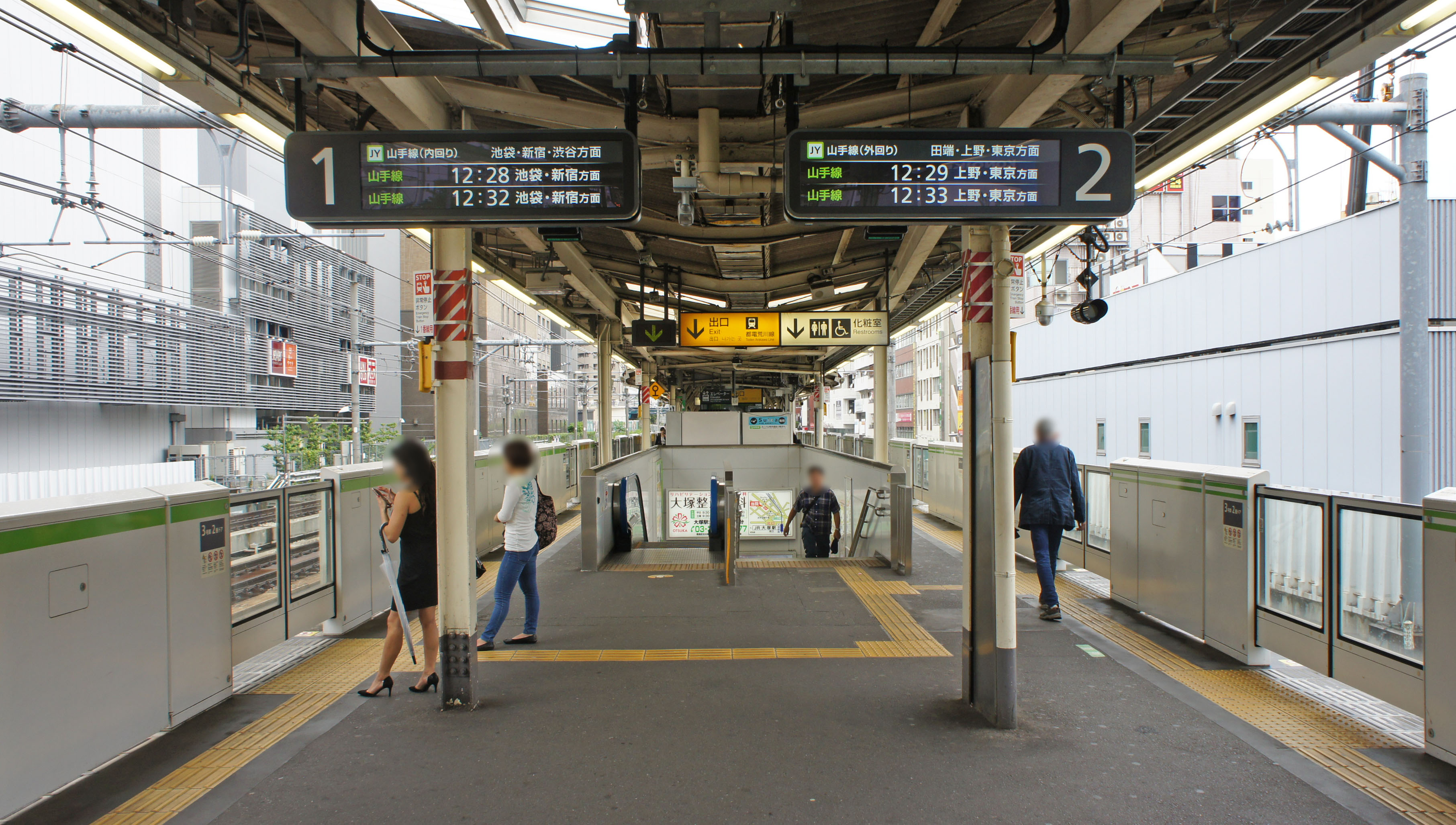
The Yamanote line platforms, September 2019

=== Platforms ===
1	Yamanote Line	for Ikebukuro, Shinjuku, and Shinagawa
2	Yamanote Line	for Tabata, Ueno, and Tokyo

== History ==
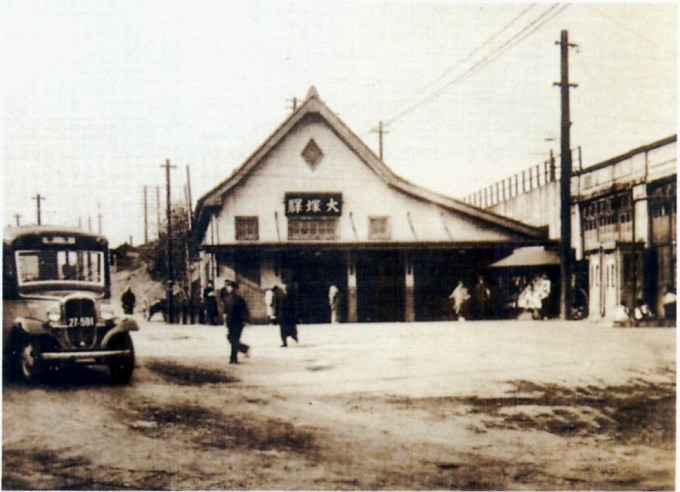
Otsuka Station in the early 20th century

The station opened on 1 April 1903.

The wooden station structure on the south side was demolished in 2009.

Station numbering was introduced in 2016 with Ōtsuka being assigned station number JY12.

== Passenger statistics ==
In fiscal 2010, the station was used by an average of 53,346 passengers daily (boarding passengers only).

== Surrounding area ==
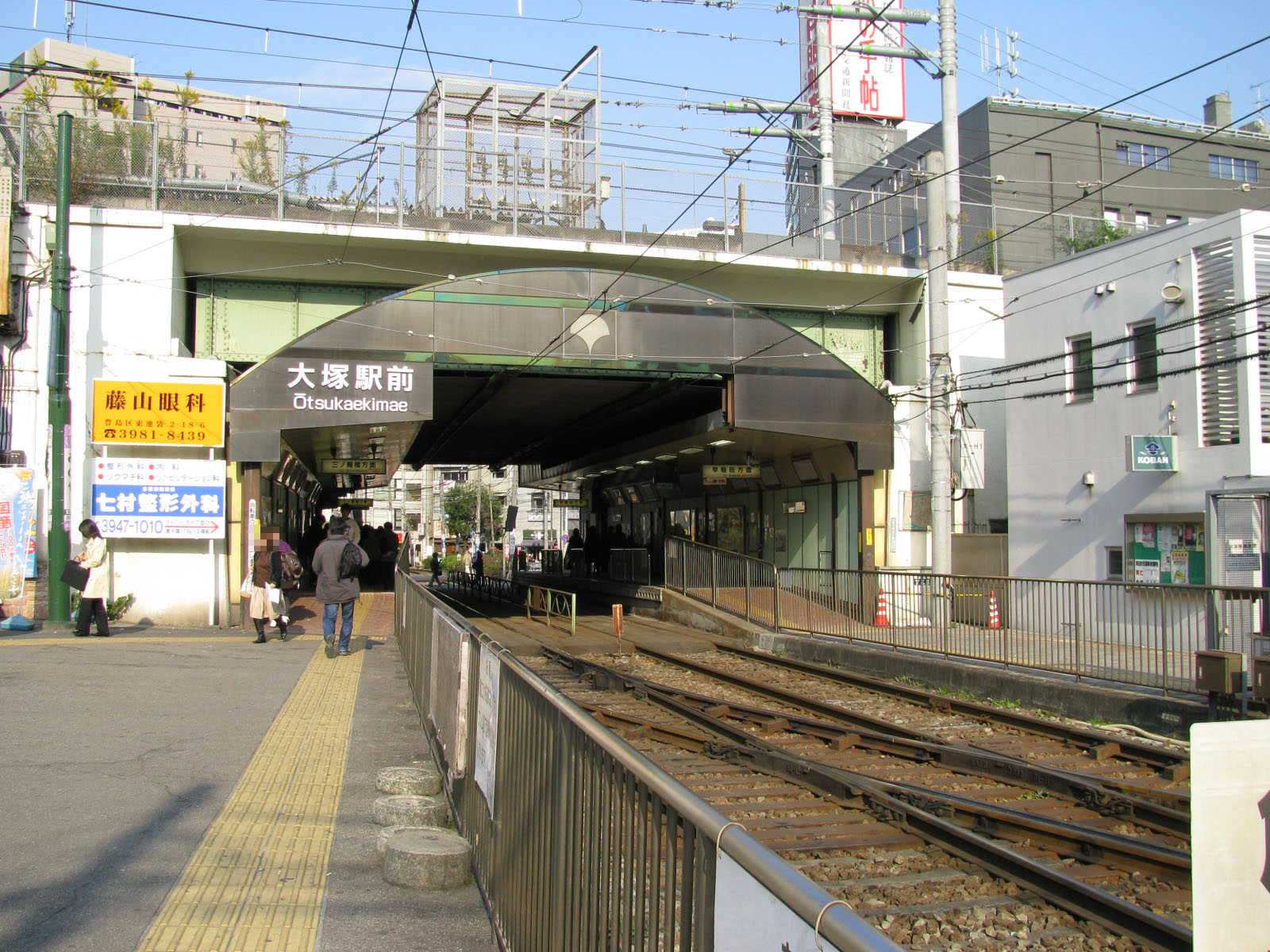
Ōtsuka-ekimae tram stop beneath the JR East station in December 2007

- Shin-ōtsuka Station (on the Tokyo Metro Marunouchi Line)
- Sugamo Police Station
- Sugamo Junior & Senior High School
- Minami-Ōtsuka Hall

== See also ==
- List of railway stations in Japan
