= Nishigahara-yonchōme Station =

Tram station in Tokyo, Japan

Coordinates: 35.7444°N 139.7330°E

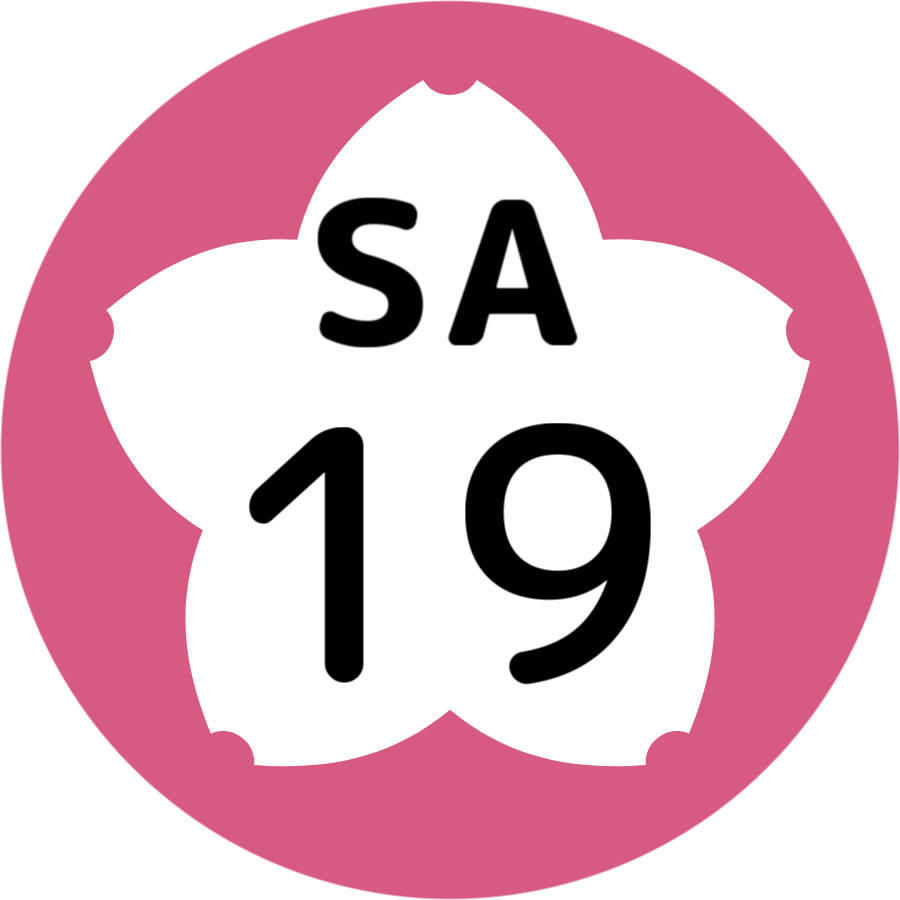
Nishigahara-yonchōme Station 西ヶ原四丁目停留場

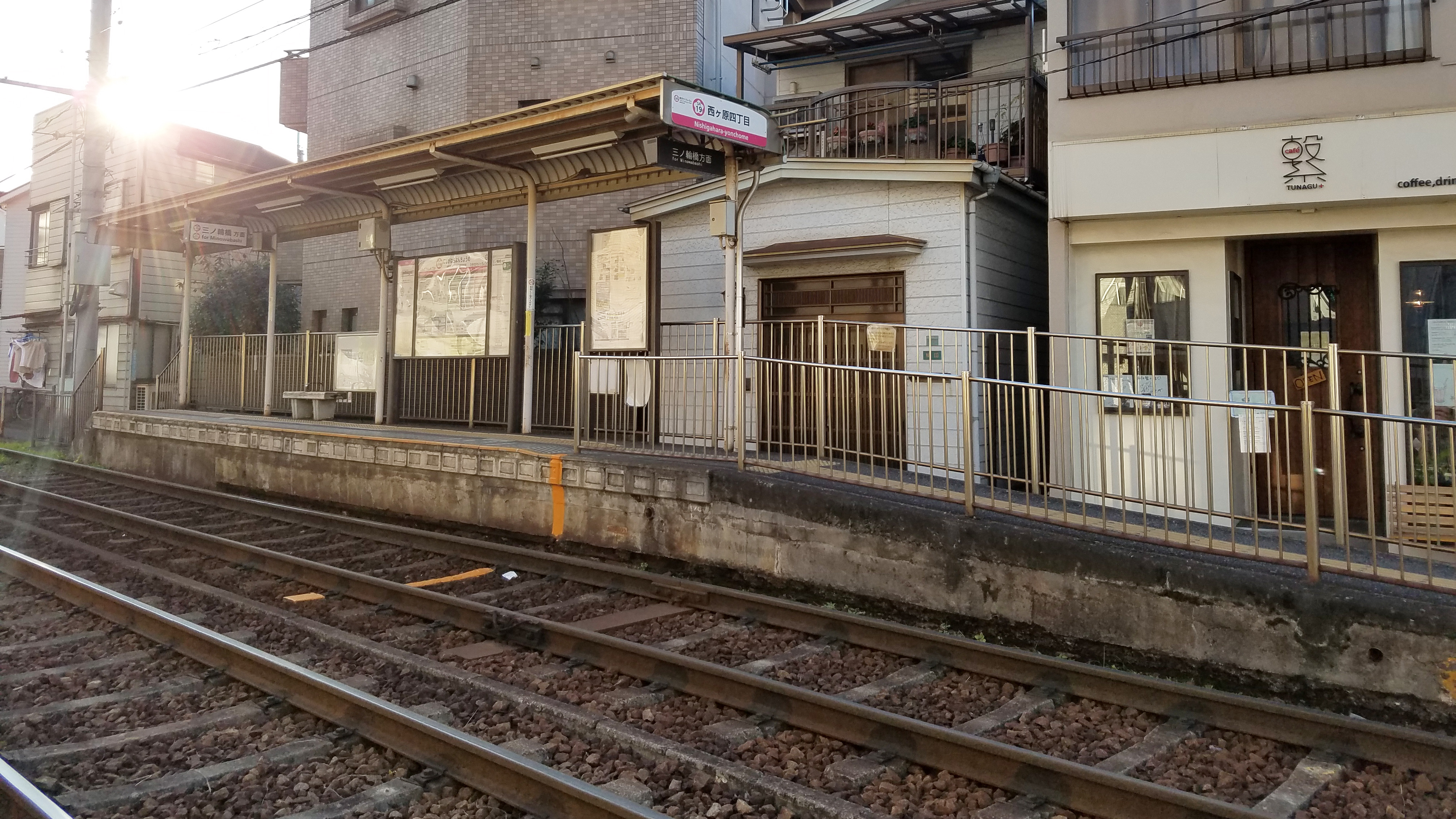
- The Minowabashi-bound platform in December 2018

General information
- Location: Nishigahara 4-chome, Kita Ward, Tokyo; Japan
- Operator: Toei
- Line: Toden Arakawa Line
- Platforms: 2 side platforms
- Tracks: 2

Construction
- Structure type: At grade

Other information
- Station code: SA19

History
- Opened: 20 August 1911; 115 years ago
- Former names: Takinogawa Station

Services
Preceding station	Toei	Following station
Shin-koshinzuka towards Waseda	Toden Arakawa Line	Takinogawa-itchōme towards Minowabashi
Location
- Location within Special wards of Tokyo Location within Tokyo Bay and Bōsō Peninsula Location within Tokyo Location within Japan

Nishigahara-yonchōme Station (西ヶ原四丁目停留場, Nishigahara-yonchōme-teiryūjō) is a tram station operated by Tokyo Metropolitan Bureau of Transportation's Tokyo Sakura Tram located in Kita, Tokyo Japan. It is 7.2 kilometres from the terminus of the Tokyo Sakura Tram at Minowabashi Station.

== Layout ==
Nishigahara-yonchome Station has two opposed side platforms.

== Surrounding area ==
- Musashino Junior & Senior High School

== History ==
- August 20, 1911: Station opened
