= Ōtsuka-ekimae Station =

Tram station in Toshima, Tokyo, Japan

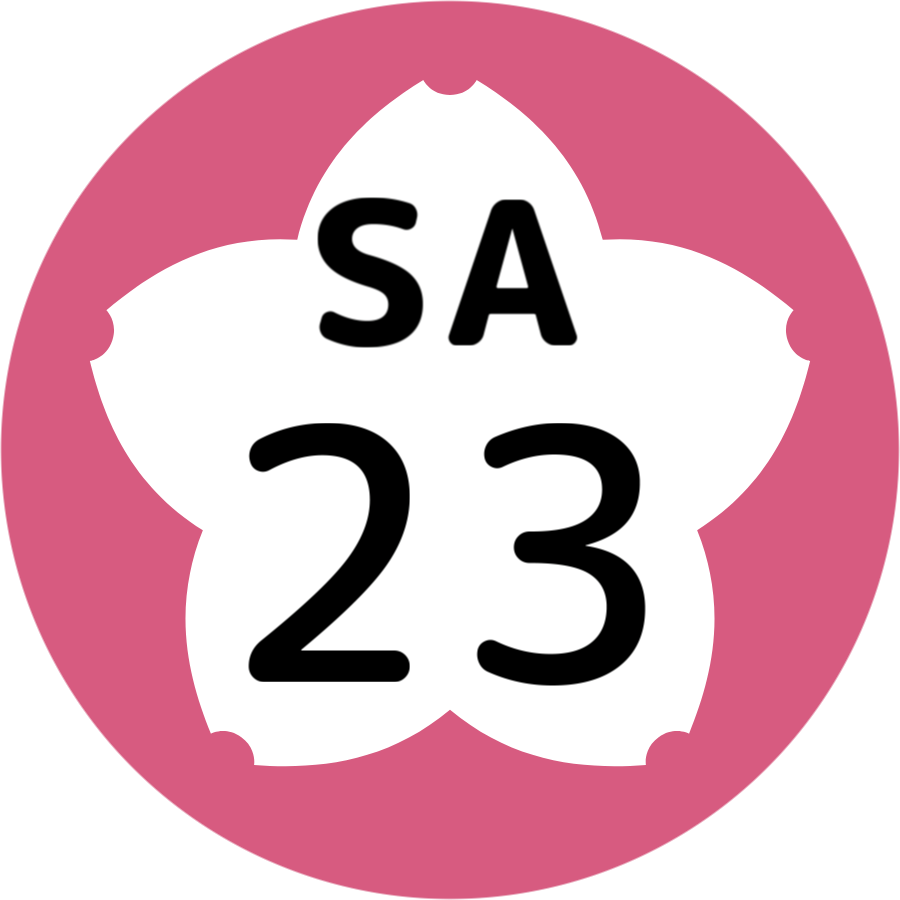
Ōtsuka-ekimae Station 大塚駅前停留場

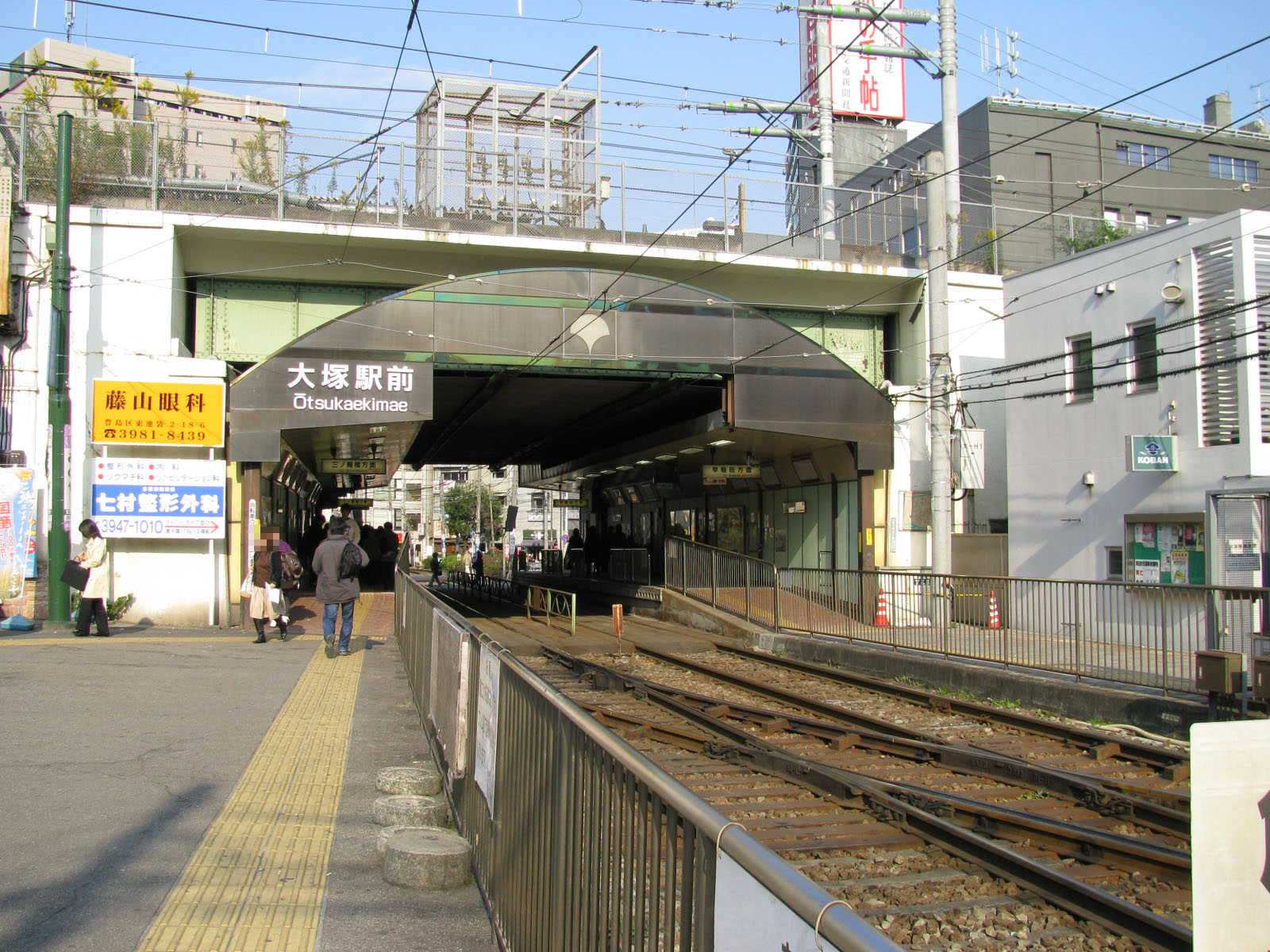

General information
- Location: Toshima, Tokyo; Japan
- Coordinates: 35.7318°N 139.7282°E
- Operator: Toei
- Line: Arakawa Line

History
- Opened: 1911

Services
Preceding station	Toei	Following station
Mukōhara towards Waseda	Toden Arakawa Line	Sugamoshinden towards Minowabashi
Location

Ōtsuka-ekimae Station (大塚駅前停留場) is a tram station located in Toshima, Tokyo, Japan. It opened on August 20, 1911.

== Lines ==
This stop is served by the Toden Arakawa Line operated by Tokyo Metropolitan Bureau of Transportation (Toei).
