= Kōshinzuka Station =

Tram station in Tokyo, Japan

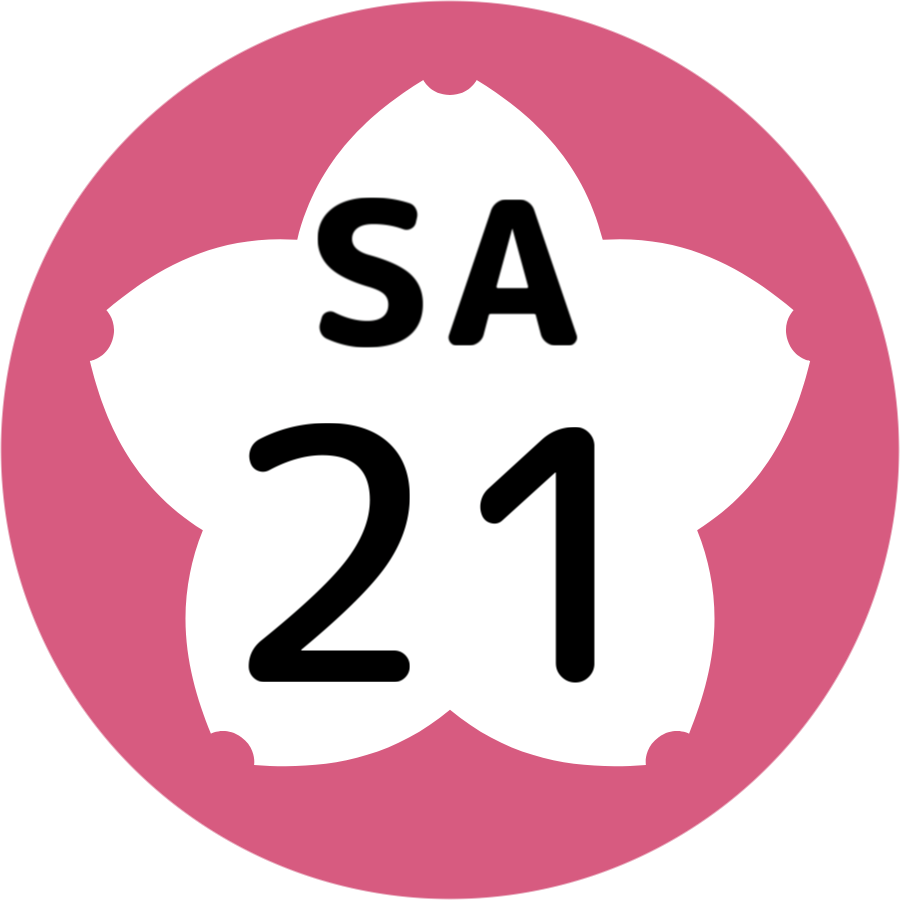
Koshinzuka Station 庚申塚停留場

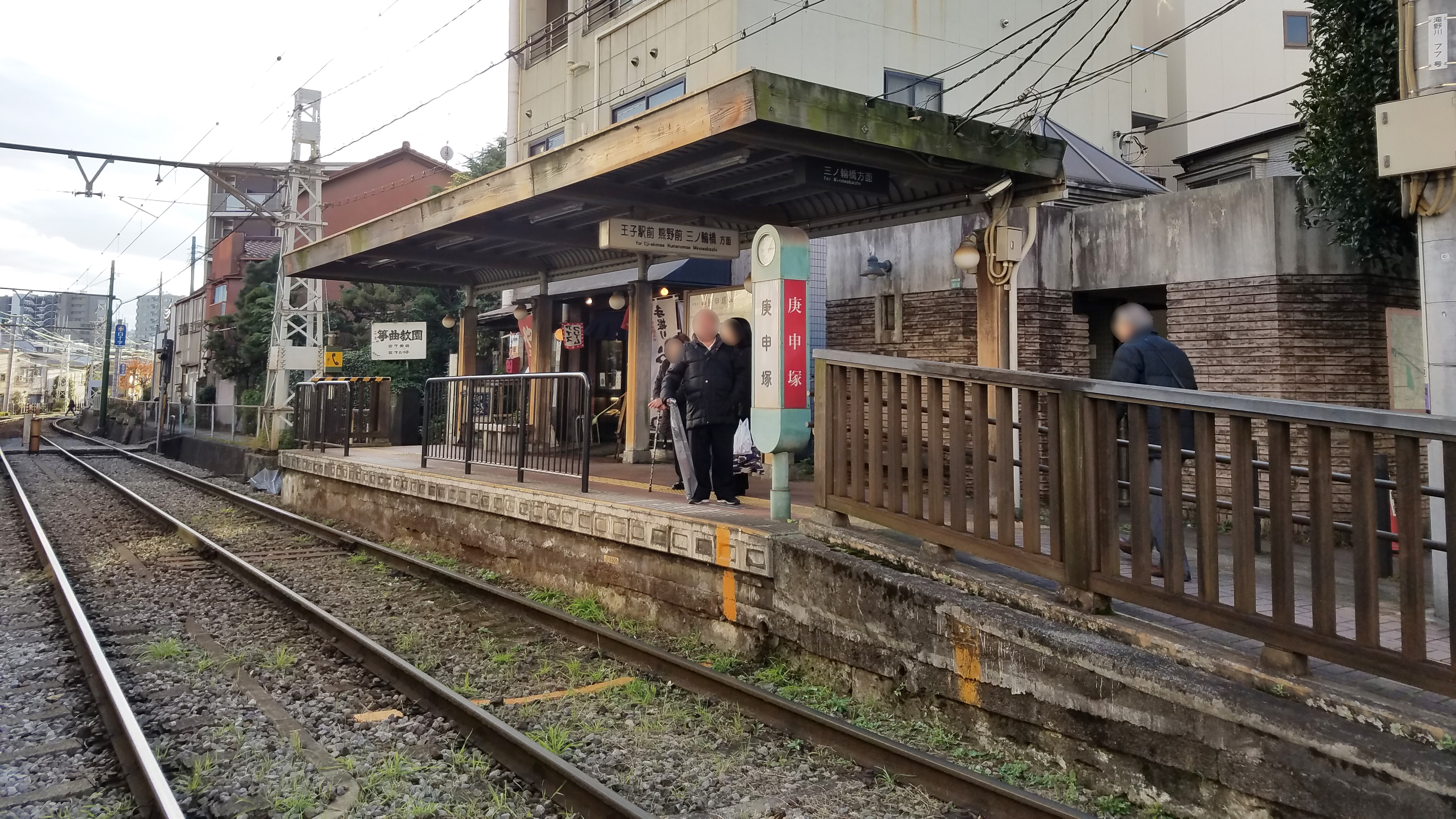
- The Minowabashi-bound platform in December 2018

General information
- Location: Nishisugamo 2-chome,Toshima, Tokyo; Japan
- Coordinates: 35°44′22″N 139°43′47″E
- Operator: Toei
- Line: Toden Arakawa Line
- Platforms: 2 side platforms
- Tracks: 2

Construction
- Structure type: At grade

Other information
- Station code: SA21

History
- Opened: 20 August 1911; 115 years ago

Services
Preceding station	Toei	Following station
Sugamoshinden towards Waseda	Toden Arakawa Line	Shin-koshinzuka towards Minowabashi
Location
- Location within Special wards of Tokyo Location within Tokyo Bay and Bōsō Peninsula Location within Tokyo Location within Japan

Kōshinzuka Station (庚申塚停留場, Kōshinzuka teiryūjō) is a station of Tokyo Sakura Tram (Toden Arakawa Line).

== Lines ==
Kōshinzuka Station is served by Tokyo Sakura Tram (Toden Arakawa Line).
