= Sugamoshinden Station =

Tram station in Tokyo, Japan

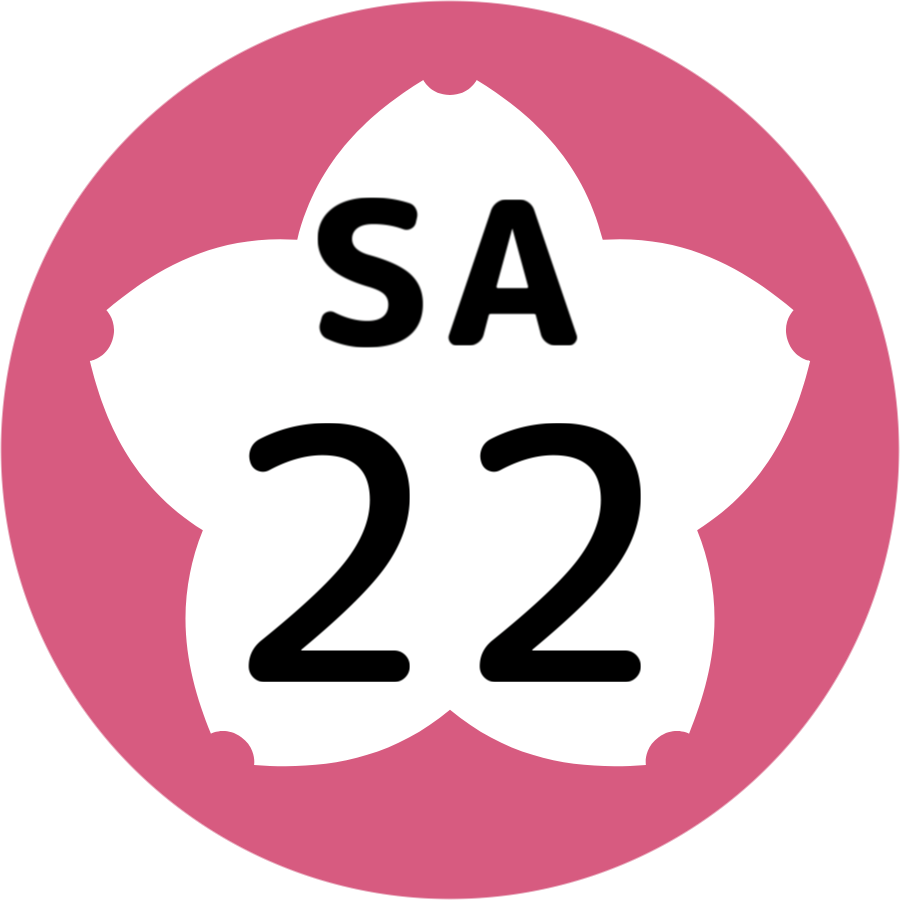
Sugamoshinden Station 巣鴨新田停留場

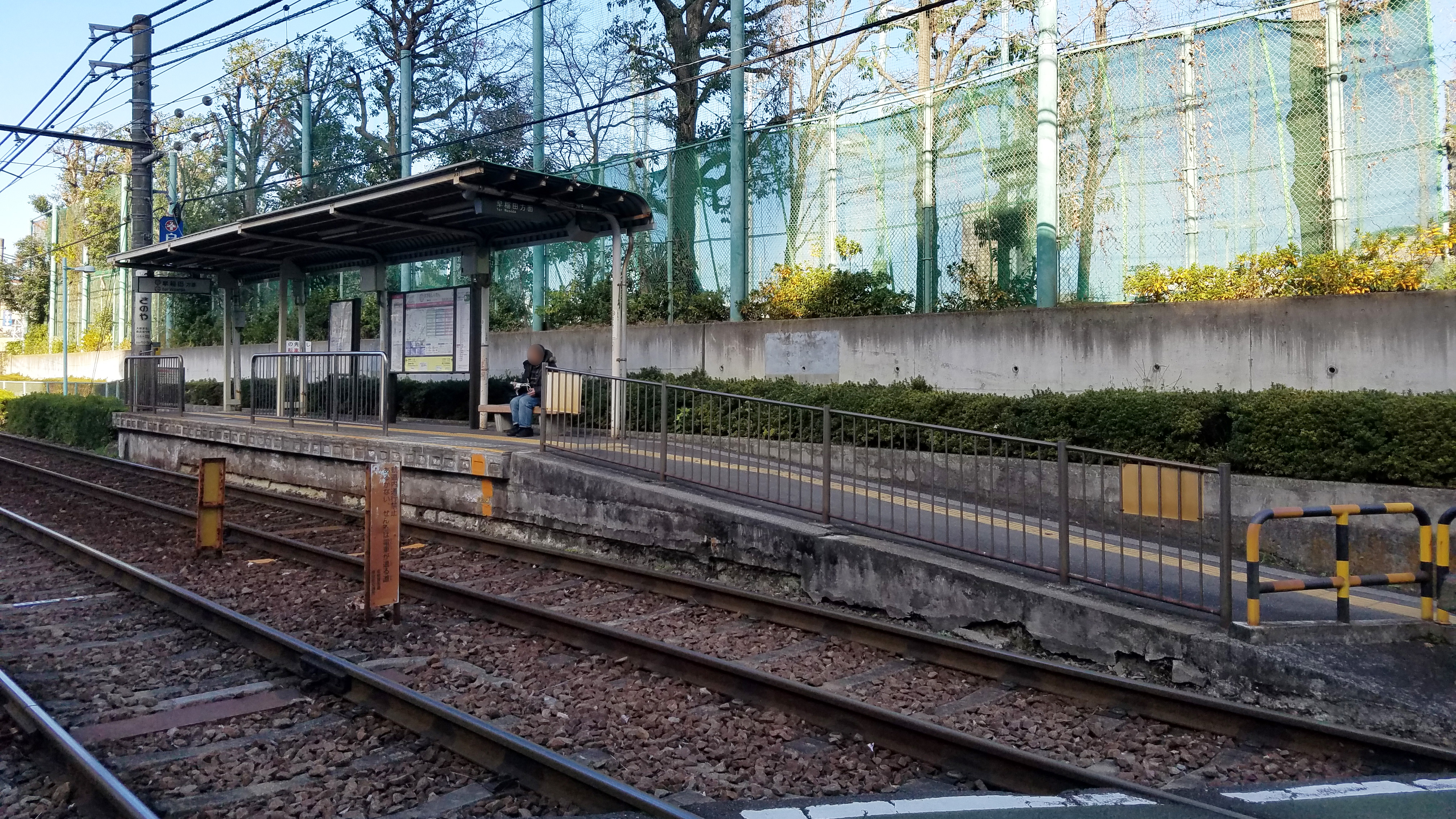
- The Waseda-bound platform in December 2018

General information
- Location: Toshima-ku, Tokyo; Japan
- Coordinates: 35.7354°N 139.7280°E
- Operator: Toei
- Line: Toden Arakawa Line
- Platforms: 2 side platforms
- Tracks: 2

Construction
- Structure type: At grade

Other information
- Station code: SA22

History
- Opened: 20 August 1911; 115 years ago

Services
Preceding station	Toei	Following station
Ōtsuka-ekimae towards Waseda	Toden Arakawa Line	Kōshinzuka towards Minowabashi
Location
- Location within Special wards of Tokyo Location within Tokyo Bay and Bōsō Peninsula Location within Tokyo Location within Japan

Sugamoshinden Station (巣鴨新田停留場, Sugamoshinden-teiryūjō) is a tram station on the Tokyo Sakura Tram in Toshima, Tokyo, Japan, operated by Tokyo Metropolitan Bureau of Transportation (Toei). It is 8.4 kilometres from the starting point of the Tokyo Sakura Tram at Minowabashi Station.

== Layout ==
Sugamoshinden Station has two opposed side platforms.

== Surrounding area ==
- Tokyo Metropolitan Bunkyo High School

== History ==
The station opened on August 20, 1911.
