= Mukōhara Station =

Tram station in Tokyo, Japan

Coordinates: 35°43′56″N 139°47′30″E

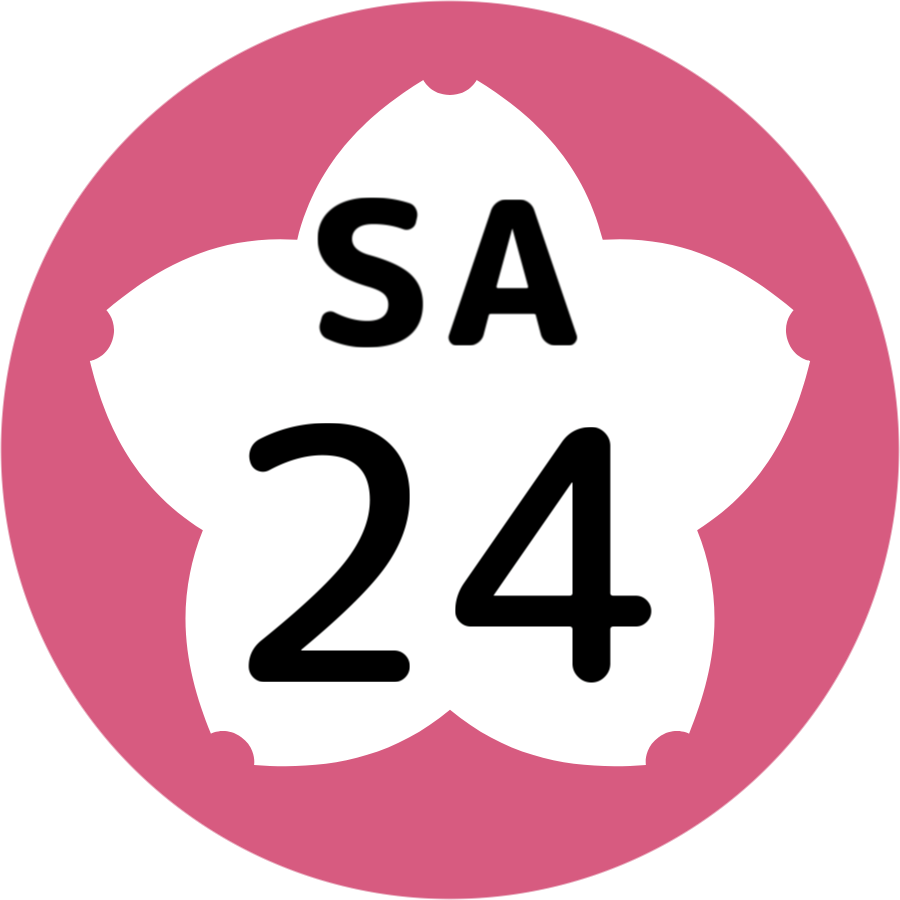
Mukōhara Station 向原停留場

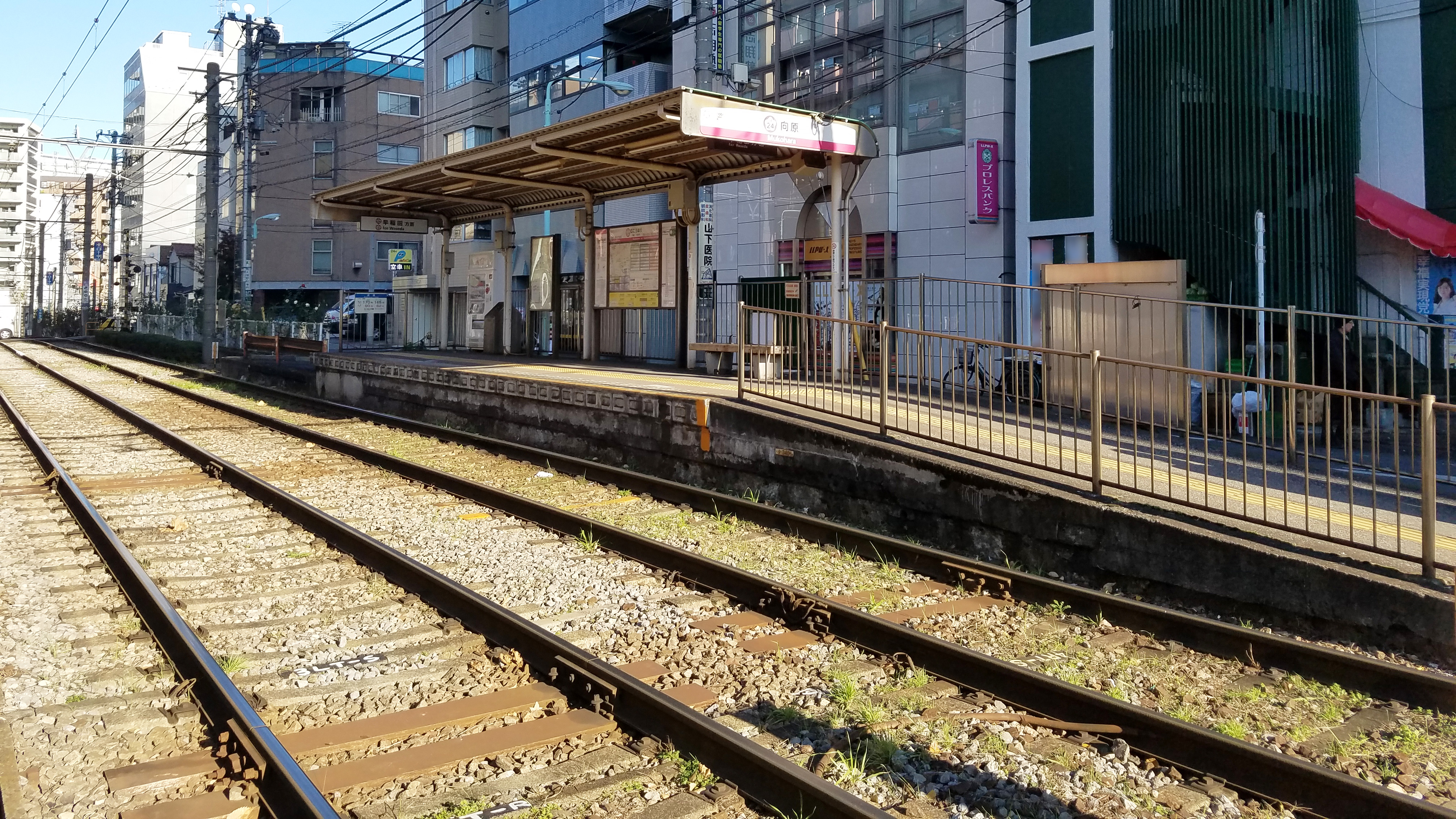
- The Waseda-bound platform in December 2018

General information
- Location: Higashiikebukuro 4-chome and Minamiotsuka 3- chome, Toshima Ward, Tokyo; Japan
- Operator: Toei
- Line: Toden Arakawa Line
- Platforms: 2 side platforms
- Tracks: 2

Construction
- Structure type: At grade

Other information
- Station code: SA24

History
- Opened: 12 December 1925; 100 years ago

Services
Preceding station	Toei	Following station
Higashi-ikebukuro-yonchome towards Waseda	Toden Arakawa Line	Ōtsuka-ekimae towards Minowabashi
Location
- Location within Special wards of Tokyo Location within Tokyo Bay and Bōsō Peninsula Location within Tokyo Location within Japan

Mukohara Station (向原停留場, Mukōhara teiryūjō) is a Tokyo Sakura Tram station located in Toshima, Tokyo, Japan.

== Lines ==
- Tokyo Sakura Tram
