= Shin-kōshinzuka Station =

Tram station in Tokyo, Japan

Coordinates: 35°44′28″N 139°43′49″E

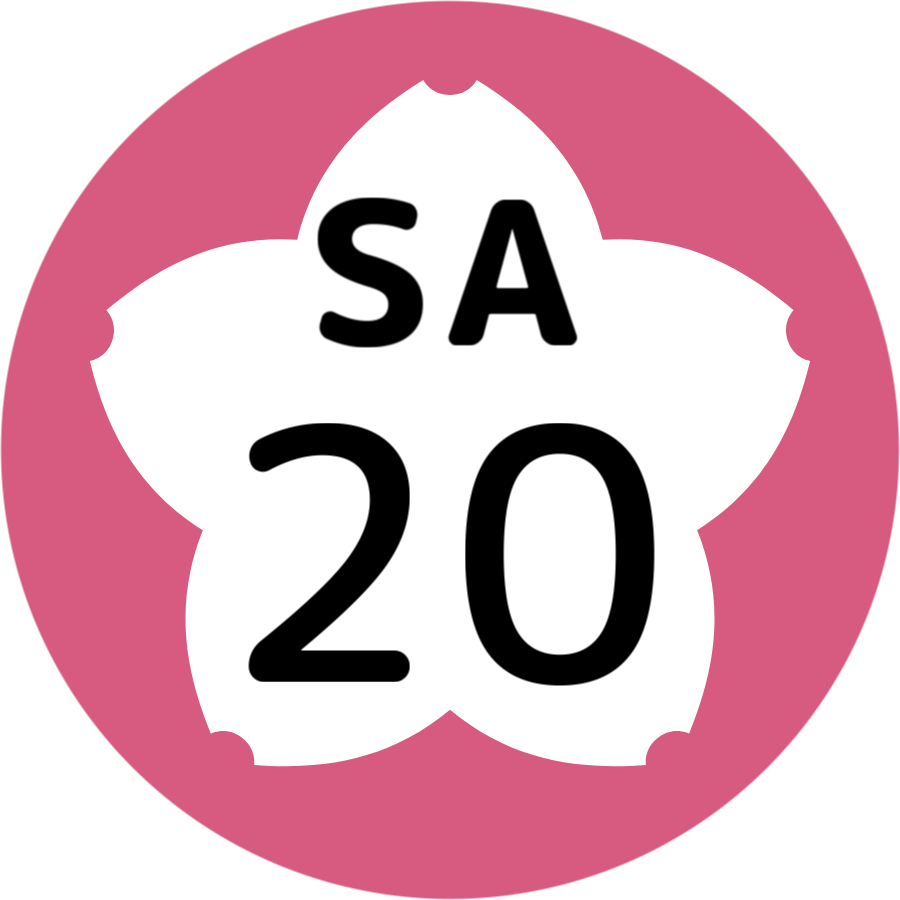
Shin-kōshinzuka Station 新庚申塚停留場

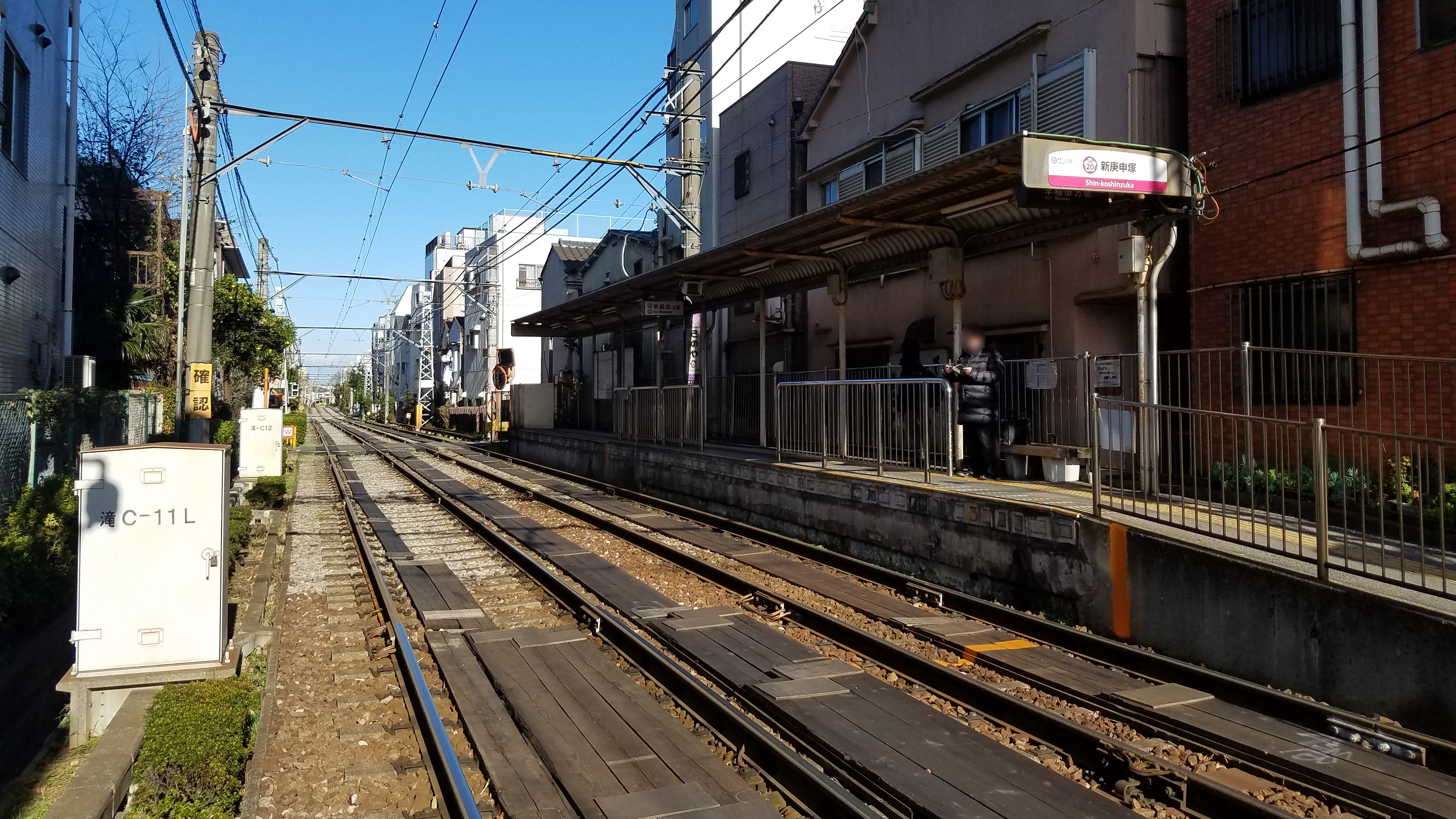
- The Waseda-bound platform in December 2018

General information
- Location: Nishisugamo 3-chome, Toshima Ward, Tokyo; Japan
- Operator: Toei
- Line: Toden Arakawa Line
- Platforms: 2 side platforms
- Tracks: 2

Construction
- Structure type: At grade

Other information
- Station code: SA20

History
- Opened: 19 April 1929; 97 years ago

Services
Preceding station	Toei	Following station
Kōshinzuka towards Waseda	Toden Arakawa Line	Nishigahara-yonchōme towards Minowabashi
Location
- Location within Special wards of Tokyo Location within Tokyo Bay and Bōsō Peninsula Location within Tokyo Location within Japan

Shin-kōshinzuka Station (新庚申塚停留場, Shin-Kōshinzuka-Teiryūjō) is a tram station located in Toshima, Tokyo, Japan. On maps, it is marked as an interchange with the Toei Mita Line at Nishi-sugamo Station.

== Lines ==
- Toei
  - Tokyo Sakura Tram
