= Nishi-sugamo Station =

Metro station in Tokyo, Japan

Coordinates: 35.7437°N 139.7287°E

Nishi-sugamo Station 西巣鴨駅

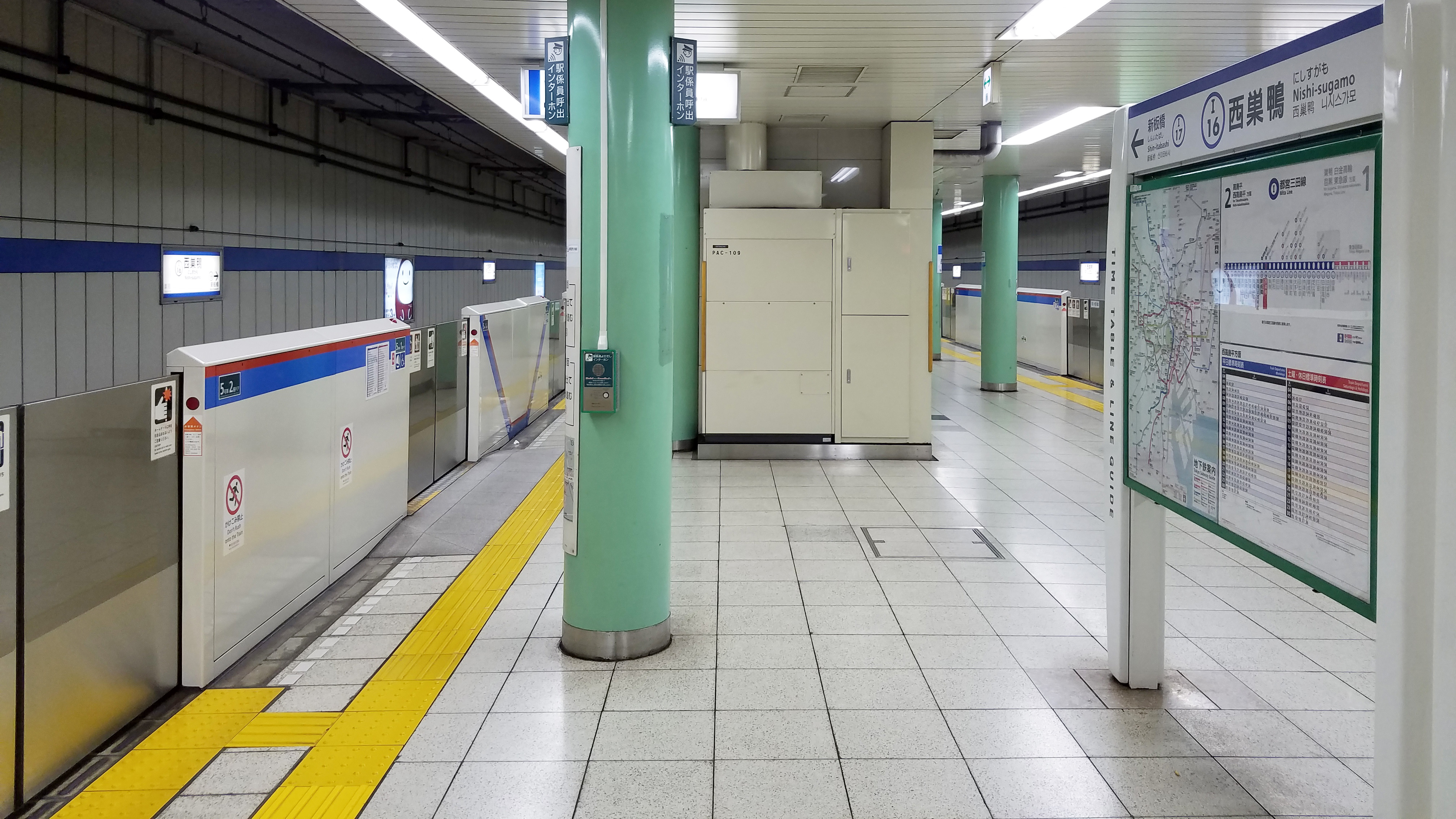
- Platform

Japanese name
- Shinjitai: 西巣鴨駅
- Kyūjitai: 西巢鴨驛
- Hiragana: にしすがもえき

General information
- Location: 25-13 Nishisugamo 3-chome, Toshima City, Tokyo; Japan
- Operator: Toei Subway
- Line: Mita Line
- Distance: 16.0 km (9.9 mi) from Meguro
- Platforms: 1 island platform
- Tracks: 2
- Connections: Shin-koshinzuka Station (Tokyo Sakura Tram)

Construction
- Structure type: Underground

Other information
- Station code: I-16

History
- Opened: 27 December 1968; 57 years ago

Services
Preceding station	Toei Subway	Following station
Shin-itabashi towards Nishi-takashimadaira	Mita Line	Sugamo towards Meguro
Location
- Location within Tokyo Yamanote Loop Location within Tokyo wards area Location within Japan

Nishi-sugamo Station (西巣鴨駅, Nishi-sugamo eki) is a subway station on the Toei Mita Line in Toshima, Tokyo, Japan, operated by Tokyo Metropolitan Bureau of Transportation (Toei). It is numbered "I-16".

== Lines ==
Nishi-sugamo Station is served by the Toei Mita Line. On maps, it is marked as an interchange with the Tokyo Sakura Tram at Shin-koshinzuka Station.

== Platforms ==
The platform is an island platform serving two tracks.

1
2
Mita Line
Mita Line
- for Sugamo, Ōtemachi, and Meguro
- Meguro Line for Musashi-Kosugi and Hiyoshi
- Sotetsu Main Line for Ebina via the Tokyu/Sotetsu Shin-Yokohama Line
- Sotetsu Izumino Line for Shōnandai via the Tokyu/Sotetsu Shin-Yokohama Line
for Nishi-takashimadaira

== History ==
The station opened on 27 December 1968.

In the 2015 data available from Japan’s Ministry of Land, Infrastructure, Transport and Tourism, Nishi Sugamo → Sugamo was one of the train segments among Tokyo's most crowded train lines during rush hour.
