= Kami-Nakazato Station =

Railway station in Tokyo, Japan

Coordinates: 35°44′48″N 139°44′49″E

JK35 Kami-Nakazato Station 上中里駅
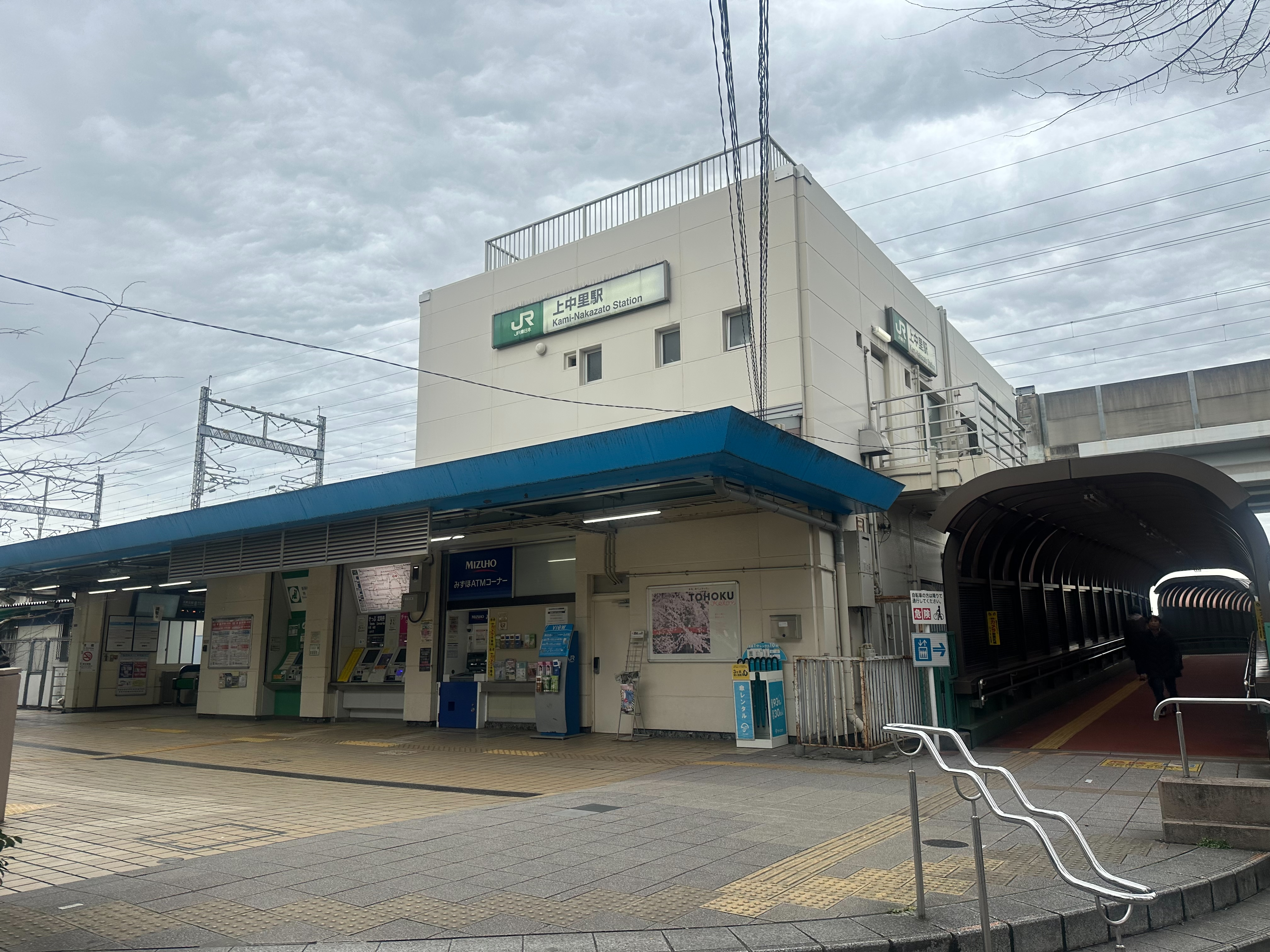
- The Kami-Nakazato station building, March 2025

General information
- Location: Kaminakazato 1-chōme, Kita, Tokyo （東京都北区上中里一丁目） Japan
- Operator: JR East
- Line: Keihin-Tōhoku Line
- Platforms: 1 island platform

History
- Opened: 1933

Passengers
- 7,052 daily

Services
Preceding station	JR East	Following station
Tabata JK34 towards Yokohama	Keihin–Tōhoku Line Rapid Local	Ōji JK36 towards Ōmiya
Location

Kami-Nakazato Station (上中里駅, Kami-Nakazato-eki) is a JR East railway station located in Kita, Tokyo, Japan.

== Line ==
Kami-Nakazato Station is served by the Keihin-Tōhoku Line between Ōfuna and Ōmiya stations. Both rapid and local services stop at this station.

== Station Layout ==
This station consists of a single island platform serving two tracks.

=== Platforms ===
1	Keihin-Tōhoku Line	for Akabane, Minami-Urawa, and Ōmiya
2	Keihin-Tōhoku Line	for Ueno, Tokyo, Yokohama and Ōfuna

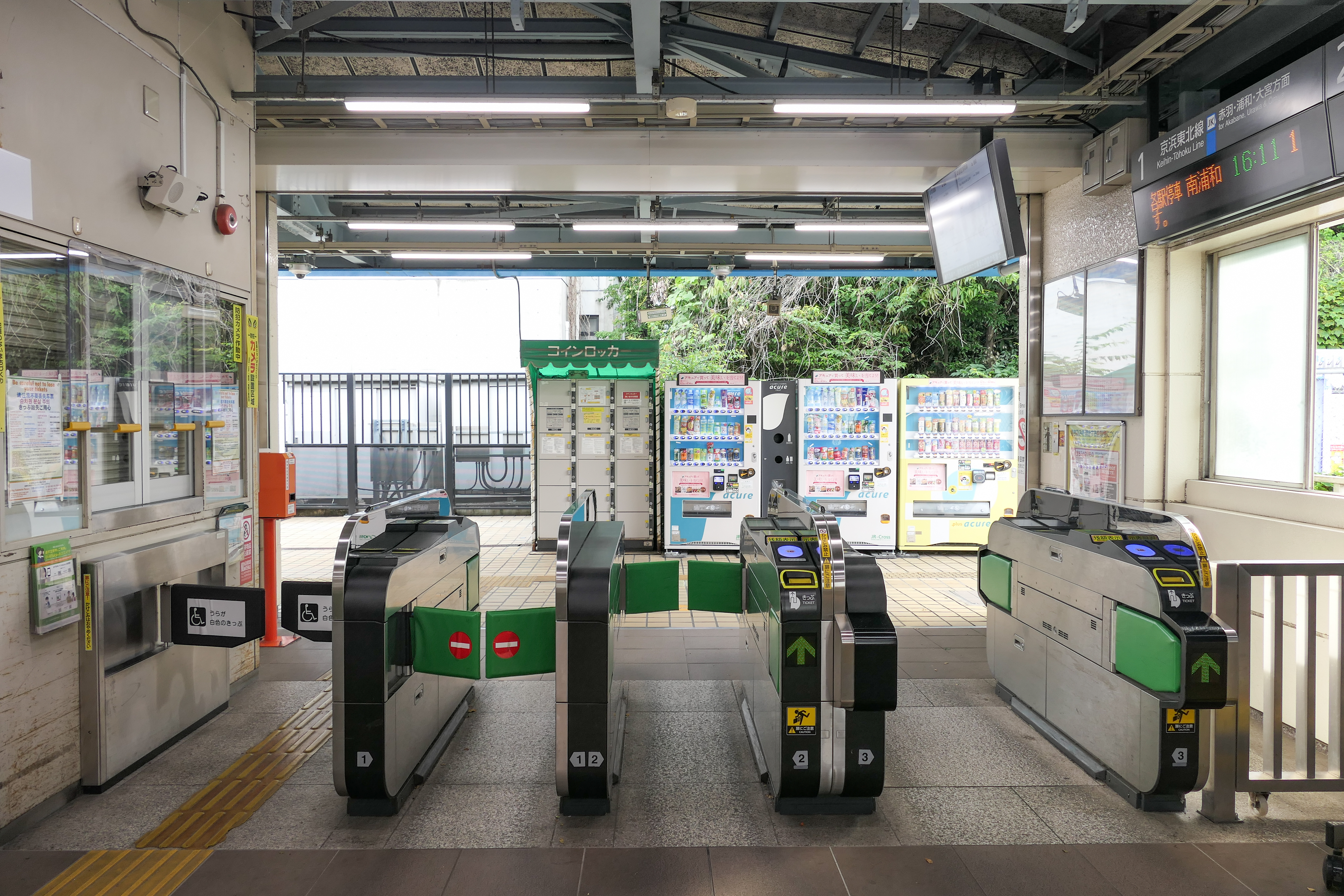
The ticket gate, May 2023

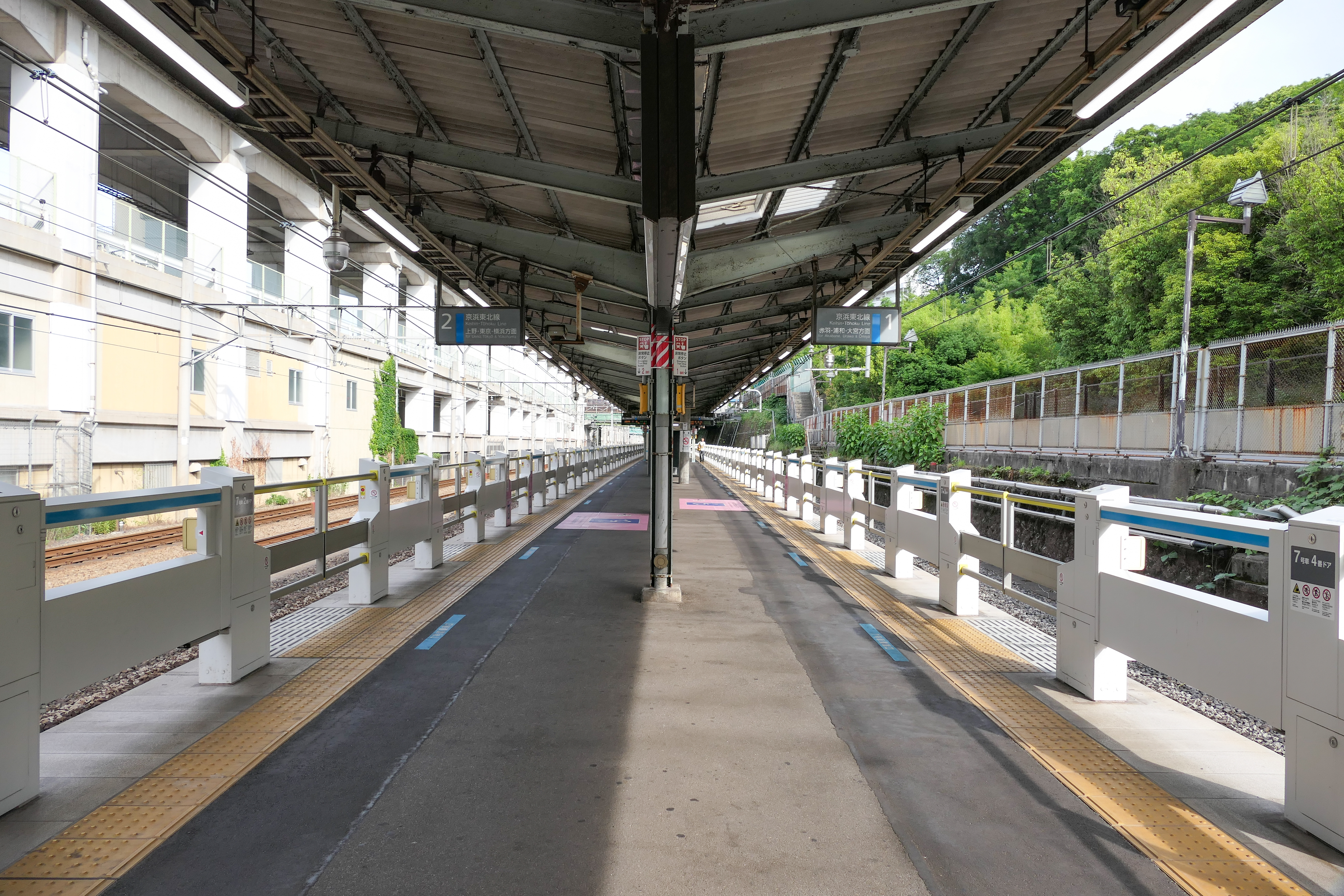
The station platforms, May 2023

== History ==
Kami-Nakazato Station opened on 1 July 1933.

== Surrounding area ==
- Nishigahara Station ( Namboku Line)
- National printing bureau
- Kyu-Furukawa Gardens
