= Murin-an =

- Murin-an (無鄰菴)
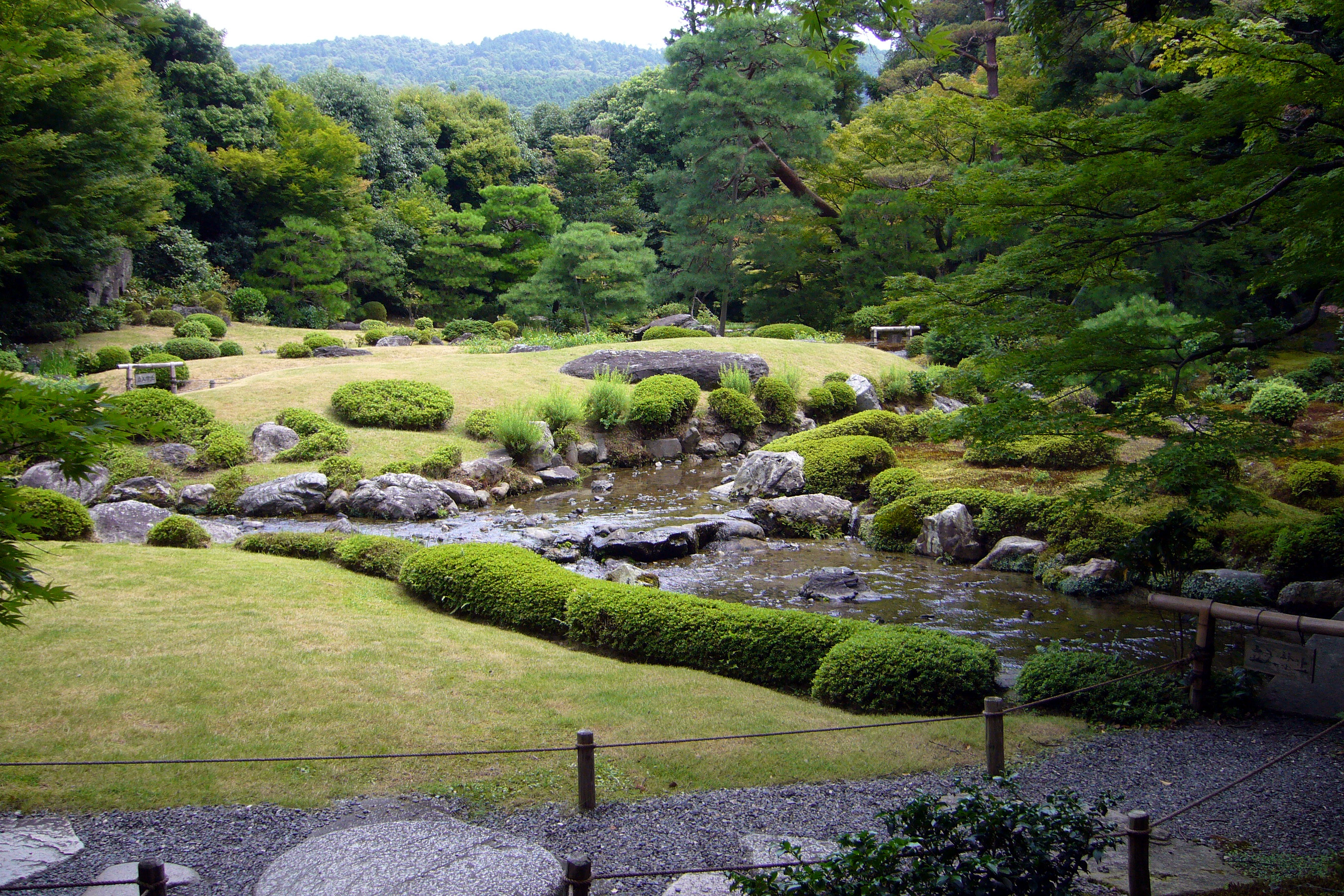
- Garden of Murin-an, with the Higashiyama Hills in the background
- Interactive map of Murin-an
- Type: Japanese garden
- Location: Kyoto, Japan
- Coordinates: 35°00′42″N 135°47′14″E
- Created: 1894

Murin-an (無鄰菴) is a Japanese garden in Kyoto, owned by political and military leader Gensui Prince Yamagata Aritomo, designed by Ogawa Jihei and built between 1894 and 1898. It is an example of a classical Japanese promenade garden of the Meiji Period.

== History ==
Gensui Prince Yamagata Aritomo (1838–1922) was an important figure in the politics and military affairs of the Meiji Period. Born into an old samurai family and devoted to military affairs, he traveled to Europe in 1869 as part of a delegation of experts to study the Prussian Army, and when he returned he helped re-organize the Imperial Japanese Army on the Prussian model. He became Minister of War in 1873, and was twice Prime Minister of Japan, from 1889 to 1891 and from 1898 to 1900.

The completion of the Lake Biwa Canal in 1890 brought a plentiful source of fresh water to the Nanzen-ji temple domain area in Kyoto. Yamagata, who was a great lover of gardens, purchased land in the area and made plans to build a villa and garden using water from the canal and its associated irrigation network.

The then-Count Yamagata (he was elevated in the Kazoku to being a Marquis in August 1895, and a Prince in September 1907) began work on the gardens in 1894, but stopped shortly afterwards due to his involvement in the First Sino-Japanese War. Yamagata ordered work to resume when the war was finished this time enlisting the help of the notable garden designer Ogawa Jihei (1860–1933), also known as Ueji, who had built the garden of the recreated Kyoto Imperial Palace nearby. In addition to the garden, he built a tea house, a traditional Japanese house, and a modern western-style house, complete with a lawn in the English style, added in 1898.

== Description ==
The garden is sited on the slopes of the Higashiyama Hills. Its water source is a canal from Lake Biwa, the largest lake in Japan, which feeds a shallow artificial stream with a triple waterfall running through the garden. The garden covers 3,135 square meters and features contrasts between shady forests and sunlit open spaces, and a long promenade to see the different sights of the garden, including many views of the Higashiyama Hills.

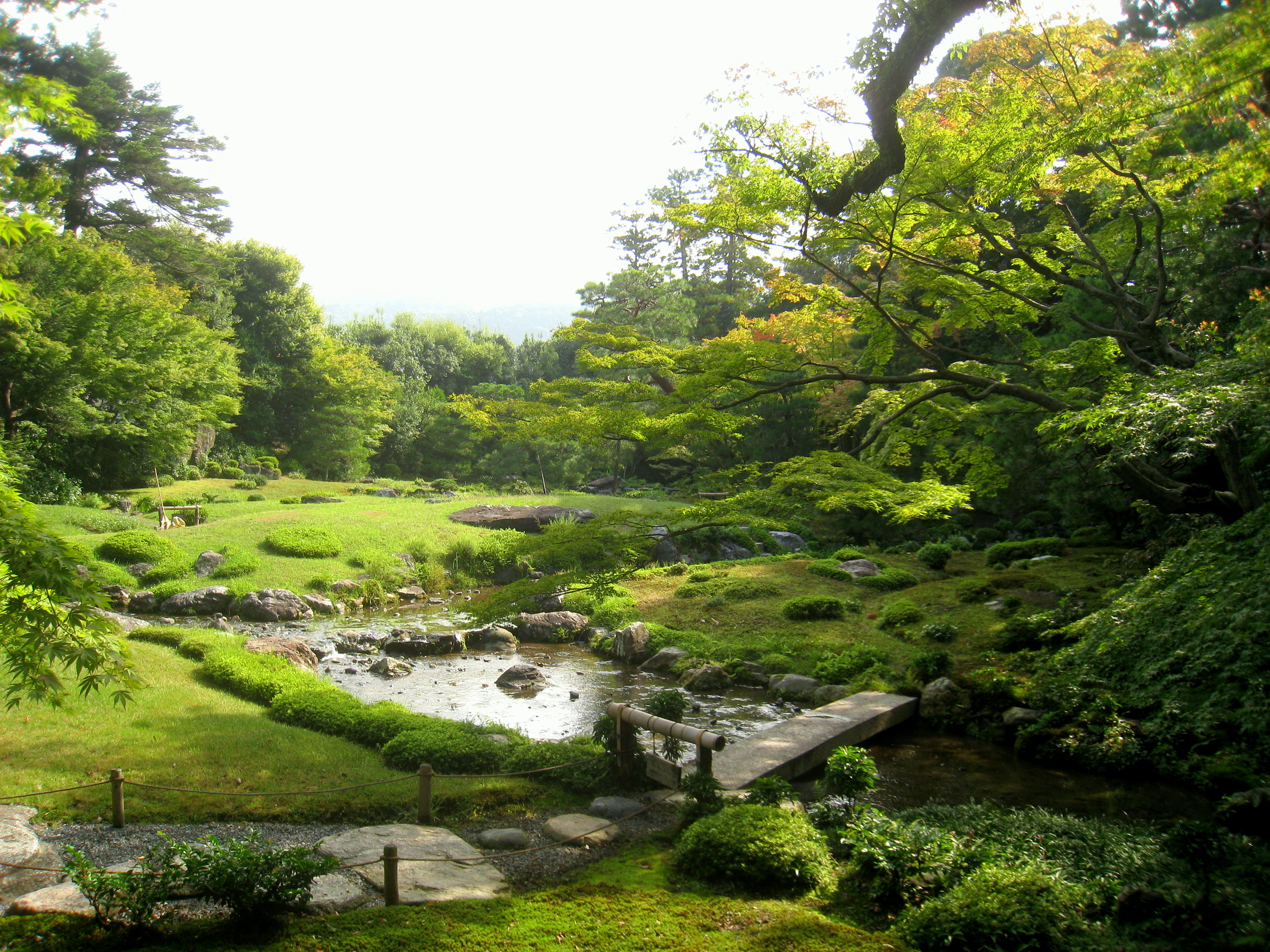
Garden view with bridge in Murin-an

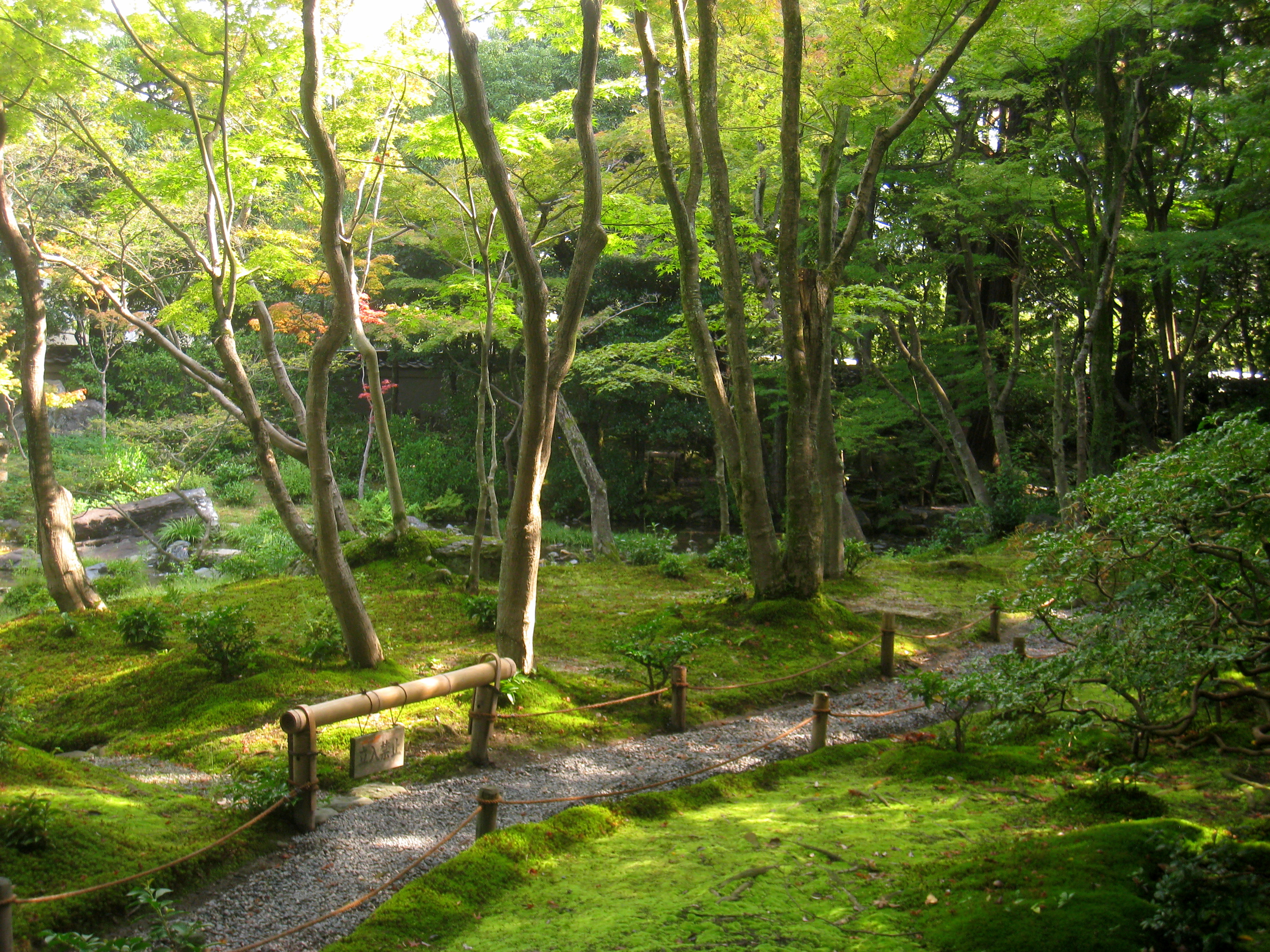
Garden path in Murin-an

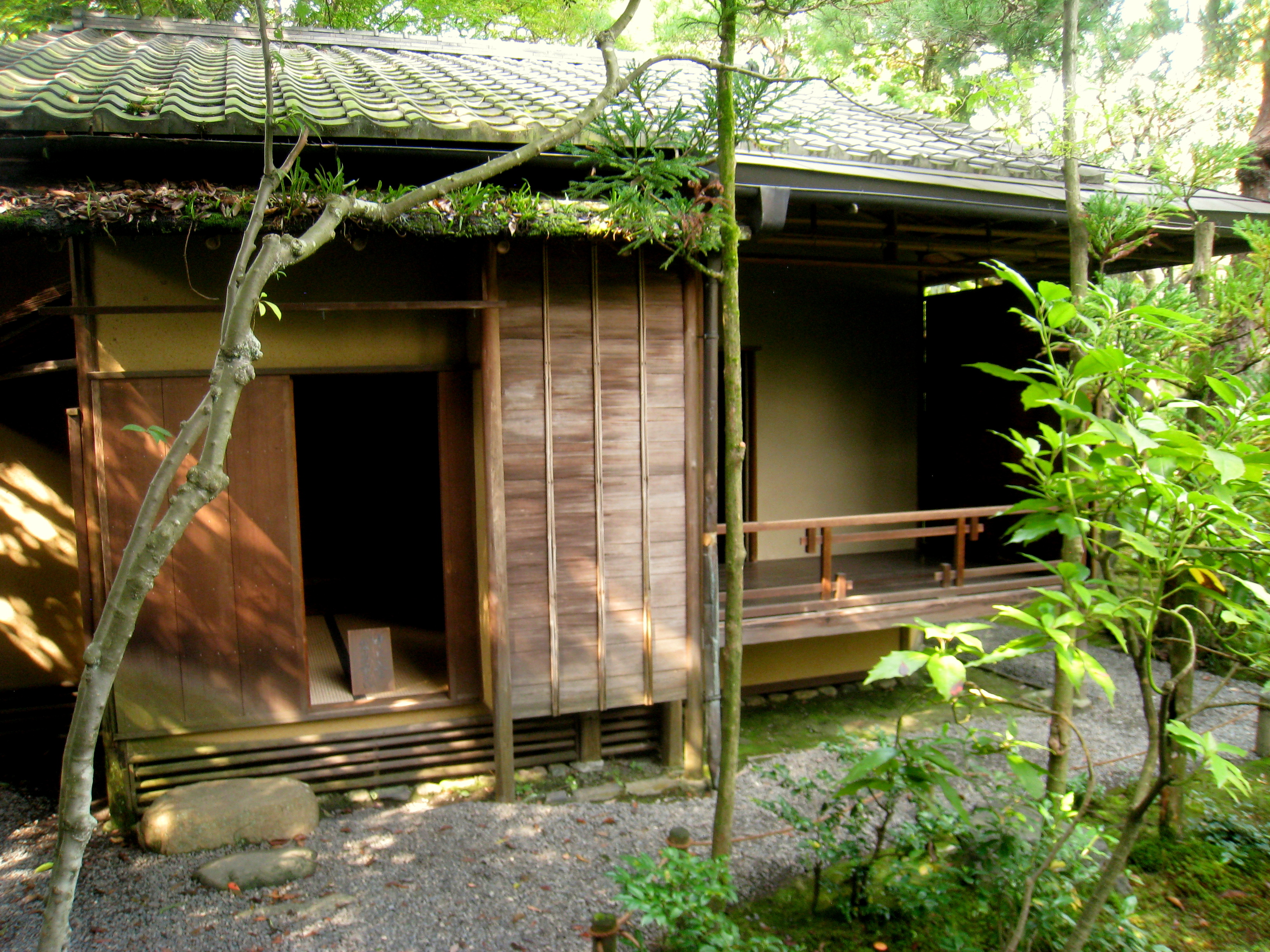
Teahouse at Murin-an

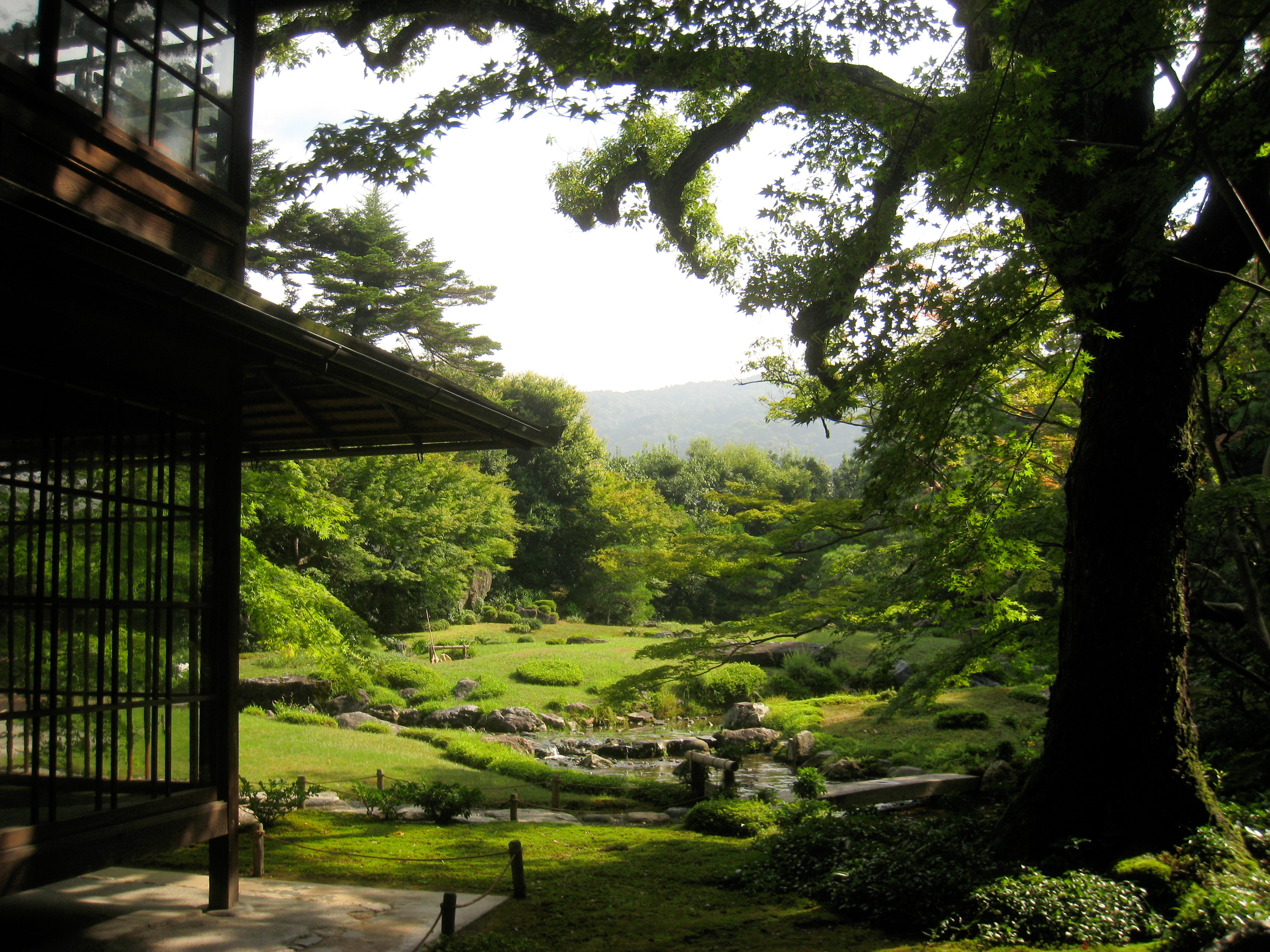
Corner of main residence in Murin-an

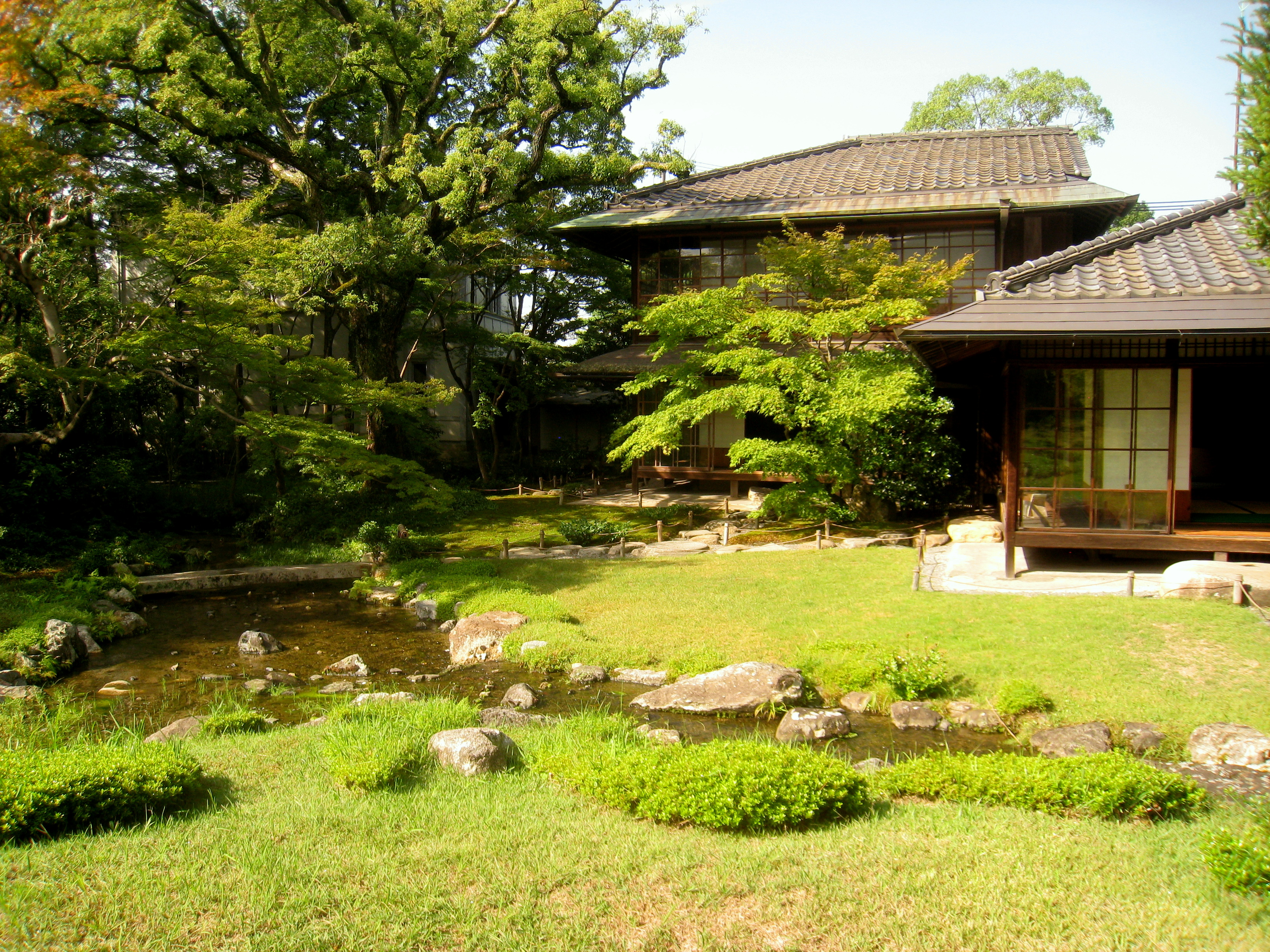
Main residence in Murin-an

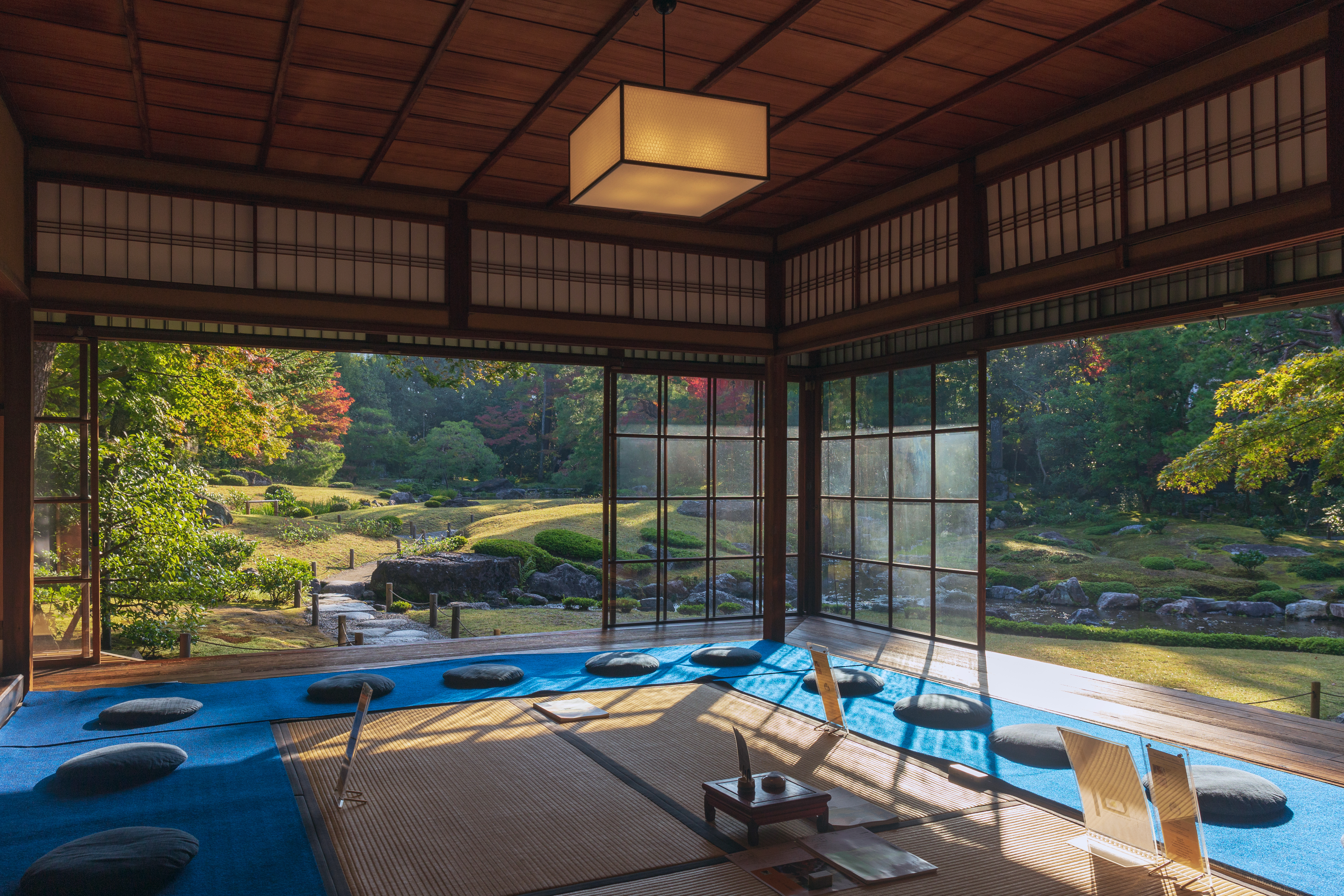
Garden view from main residence in Murin-an

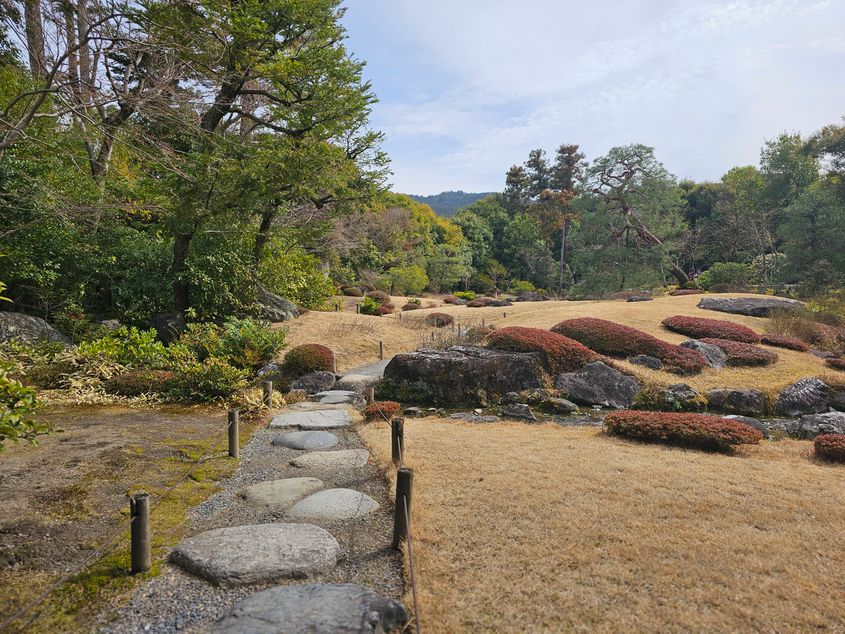
Garden view Murin-an in February

== Bibliography ==
- Elisseeff, Danielle (2010). Jardins Japonais. Paris: Nouvelles Editions Scala. ISBN 978-2-35988-029-8.
- Mansfield, Stephen (2011). Japan's Master Gardens - Lessons in Space and Environment (Hardback). Tokyo, Rutland, Singapore: Tuttle. ISBN 978-4-8053-1128-8.
