= Ogawa Jihei VII =

Japanese gardener

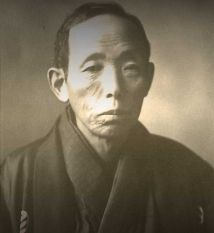
Ogawa Jihei VII

Ogawa Jihei VII (小川治兵衛, Ogawa Jihei; May 25, 1860 – December 2, 1933), also known under his titular name as the seventh Ueji (植治), was a Japanese garden architect of the Meiji era and Taishō era of modern Japan.

== Biography ==
He was born Yamamoto Gennosuke and adopted into the Ogawa family at the age of 17 with his marriage to Ogawa Mitsu. After the sudden death of the sixth Ueji, he became the head of the family with 19 years. The Ueji title is a name that was given to the heads of the Ogawa family, who specialised since generations in gardening and landscape architecture for clients around Kyoto, the old capital city. It is also the name of the company that is still led by the family today.

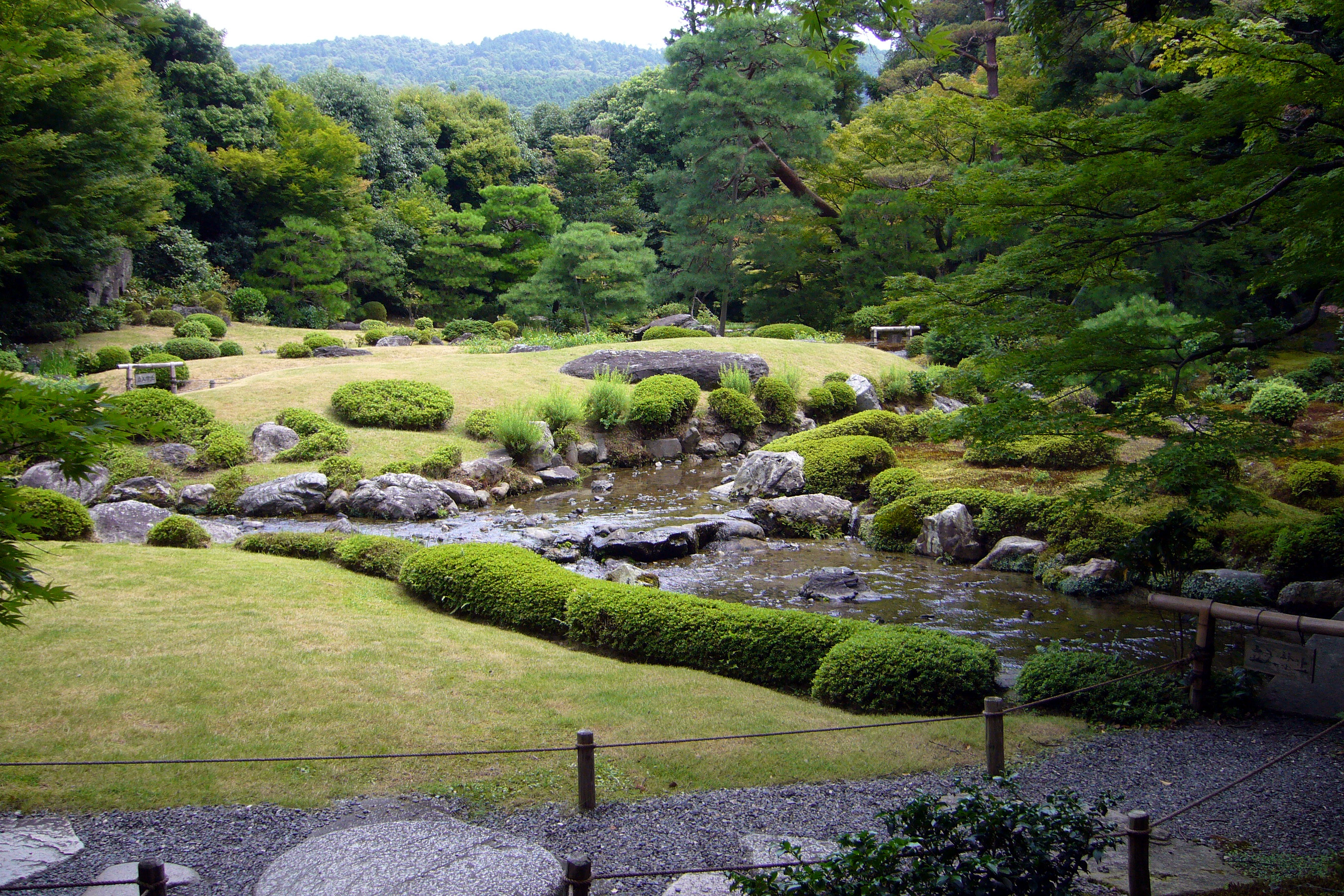
Garden of Murin-an with the Higashiyama in the background, designed by him in 1894–1898

Ueji grew up in a time when the country was rapidly changing and leaving the Edo period behind to westernise. In this uncertain time he was given the commission by statesman Yamagata Aritomo, an important figure in the political and military fields, to create the garden for his Murin-an villa in Kyoto. It was built from 1894 to 1898. The garden is considered one of the masterpieces of Japanese landscape architecture and has been registered by the government as an Important Cultural Property.

Other noted creations of his are the Heian Shrine gardens, Maruyama Park and Kyu-Furukawa Gardens.

Ueji worked on various villa gardens in the Nansenji area (Kyoto). These gardens are representative of his methodology and style which involve: (1) Shakkei (borrowed scenery) of Higashiyama (2) the composition of water flows, waterfalls and ponds sourced from the abundant water provided by the Lake Biwa Canal irrigation network or Shirakawa River (3) the use of Roji (a garden leading to a teahouse ) as one component of the garden (4) the use of lawn as a gathering space inside the garden.
