= Kyū-Furukawa Gardens =

Park in Tokyo, Japan

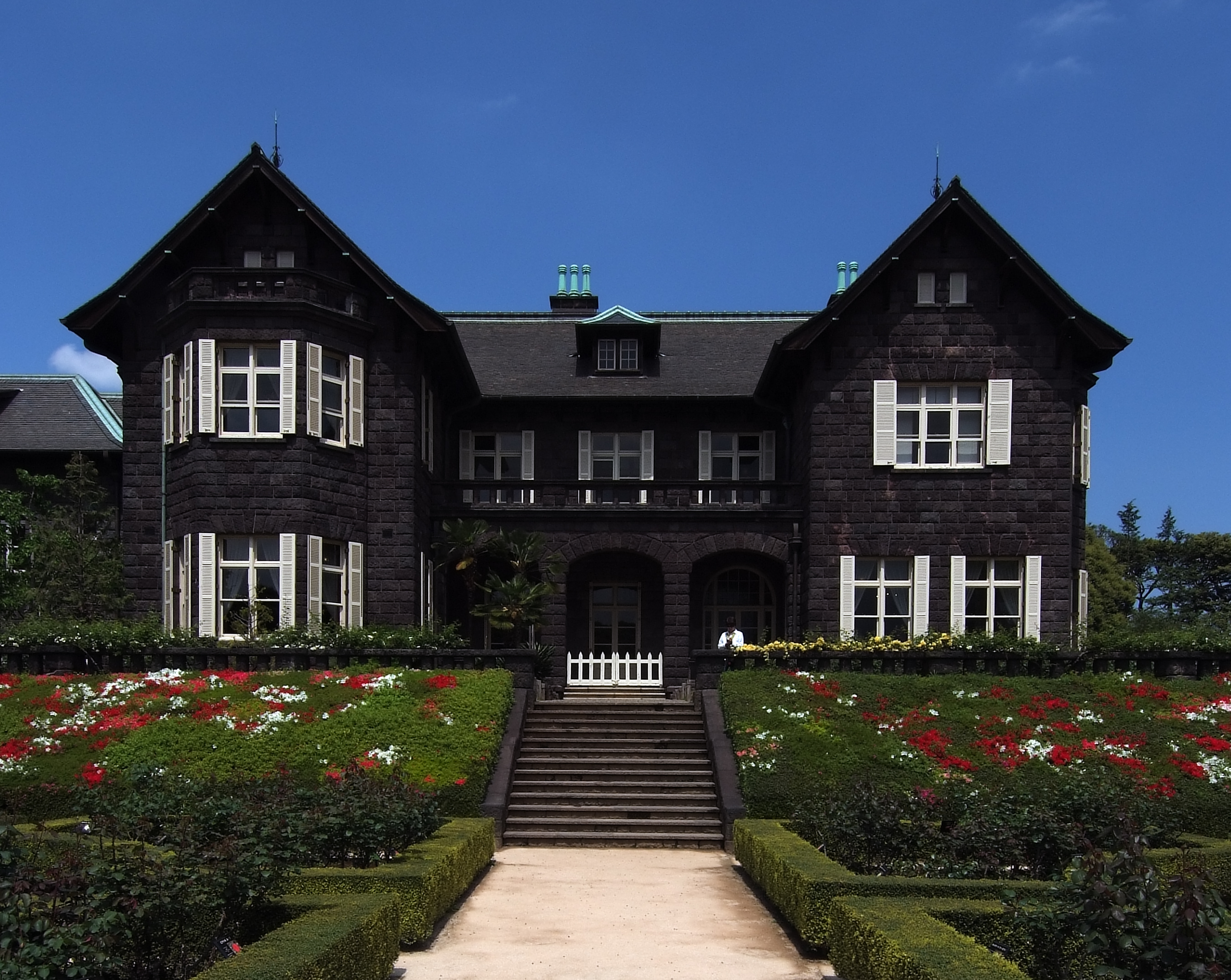
- Mansion in the gardens
- Interactive map of Kyū-Furukawa Gardens
- Location: Kita, Tokyo, Japan
- Coordinates: 35.742557°N 139.746159°E
- Area: 30,780.86 square metres (331,322.4 ft^{2})
- Created: 30 April 1956

Kyū-Furukawa Gardens (旧古河庭園, kyū-furukawa teien) is a Tokyo metropolitan park in Nishigahara, Kita, Tokyo. The park includes a Western-style mansion, a Western-style rose garden, and a Japanese-style garden, all of which were built in early 20th century.

== Outline ==
The gardens were built by Baron Toranosuke Furukawa. The Western-style mansion and garden were designed by English architect Josiah Conder and were completed by 1917. Conder was called the "father of Japanese modern architecture" and also designed Rokumeikan, Kyu-Iwasaki-tei Garden, and Holy Resurrection Cathedral. The Japanese garden was designed by Ogawa Jihei VII and was completed in 1919.

Baron Furukawa was the owner of Furukawa zaibatsu which owned Ashio copper mine.

== Western building and garden ==
The exterior of the building and the ground floor rooms are designed in the Western style, but the second floor rooms are mostly in Japanese style with tatami mats. The mansion is built on a steep slope of Musashino Terrace. The building is located on the top of a hill, with the Western-style garden on the slope, and Japanese garden on the bottom. The western garden is a complex of Italian style and geometric French style rose garden. On the bottom of the western garden is a Rhododendron plantation which harmonises the western geometric garden and non-geometric Japanese garden.

== Japanese garden ==
The Japanese garden is surrounded by a deep forest. The Western building and garden are hidden by tall trees. In the centre of the stroll garden is an artificial pond called "Shinji-ike" ("Heart letter pond"). The pond's shoreline is designed in the shape of the Kanji "心(Shin)", which means "heart". Around the pond are Tōrōs (stone lanterns), artificial hills, water falls, islands, and a tea ceremony house. The park in its current state was opened to the public in 1956.

== Access ==
General admission is ¥150. The park is open daily until 5 PM. It is a quick walk from Kami-Nakazato Station on the JR Keihin-Tōhoku Line or Nishigahara Station on the Tokyo Metro Namboku Line.

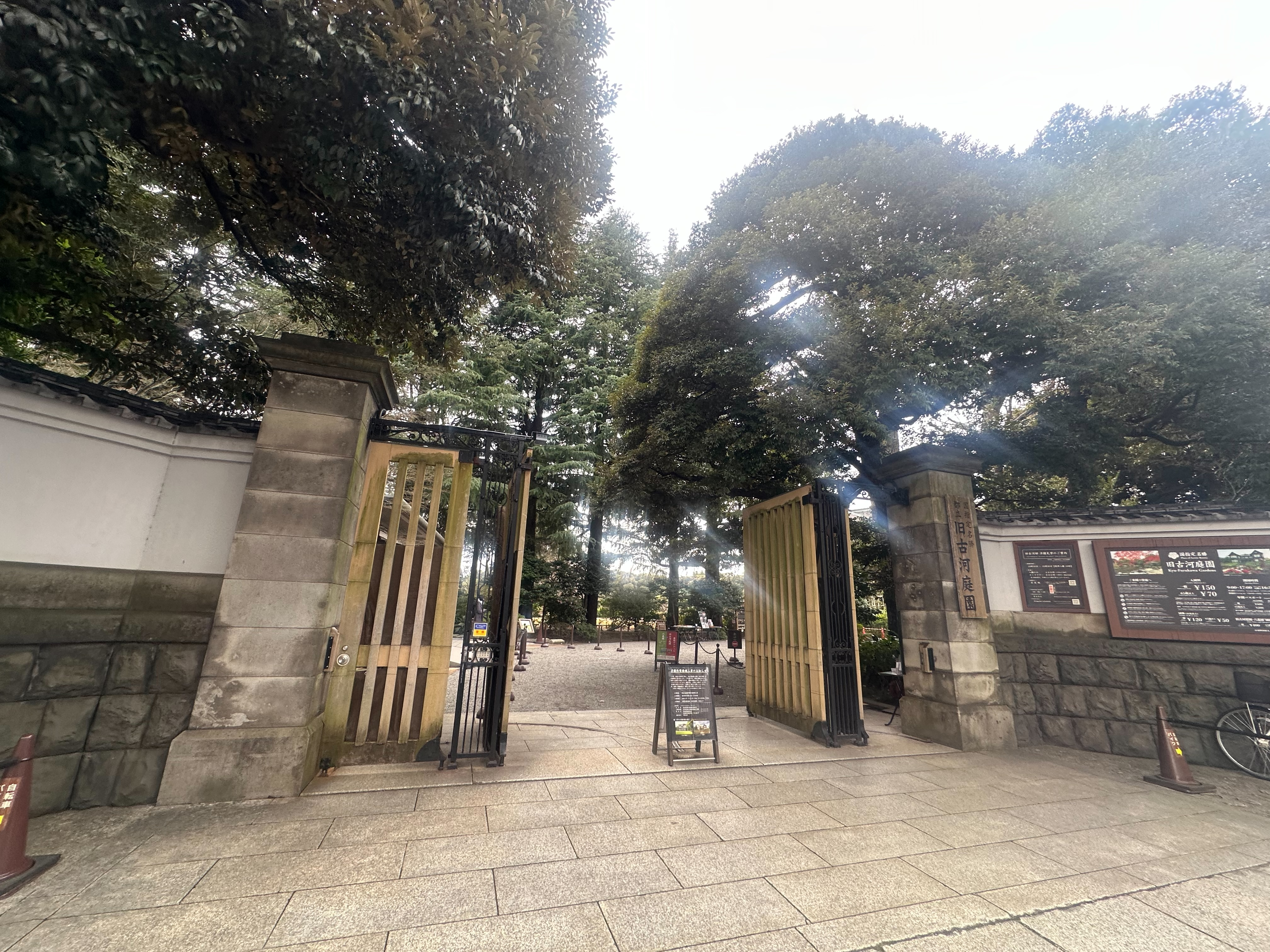
Entrance to the gardens.

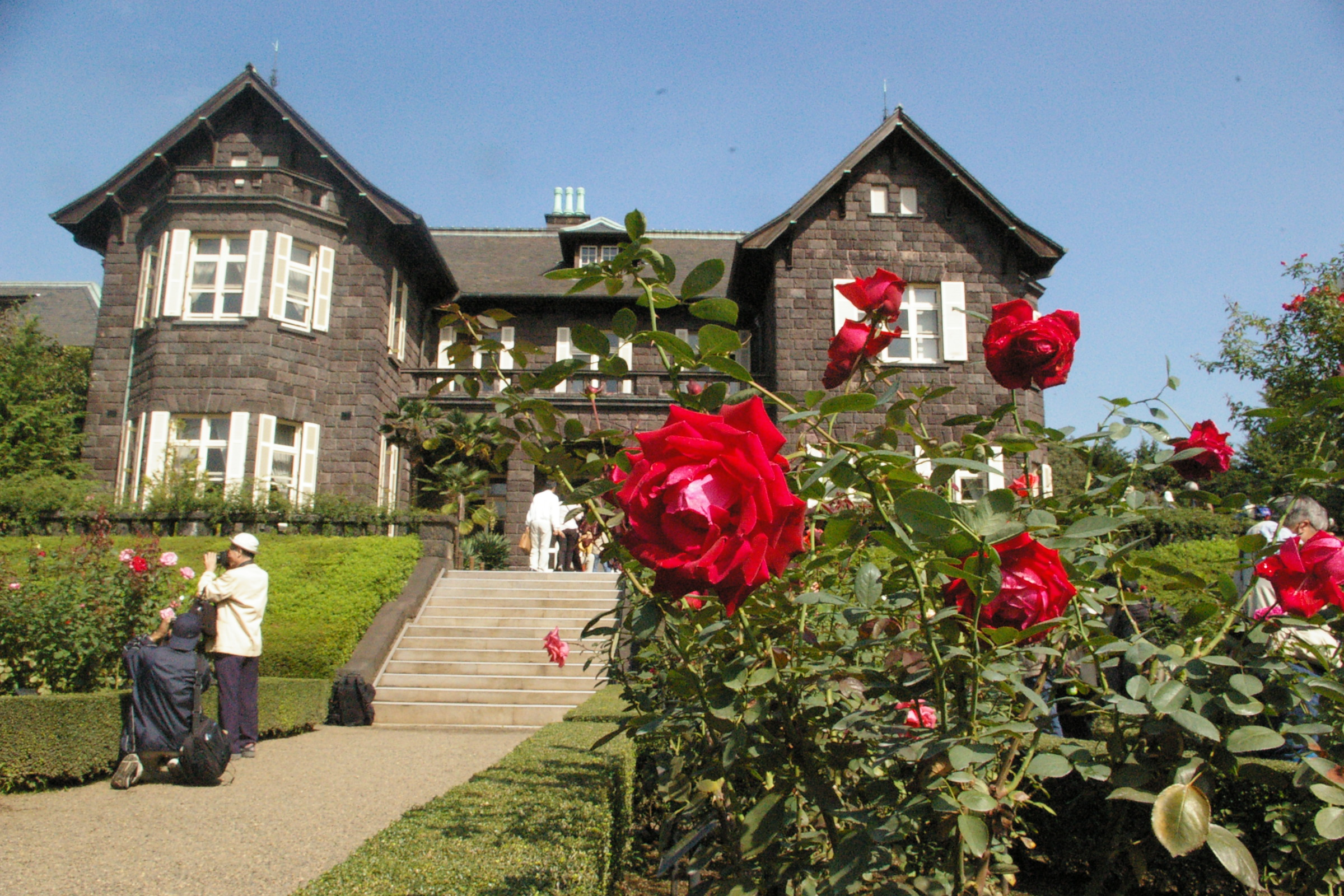
The outside of the mansion that can be found in the gardens.

Several scenes from inside the park, 2012.

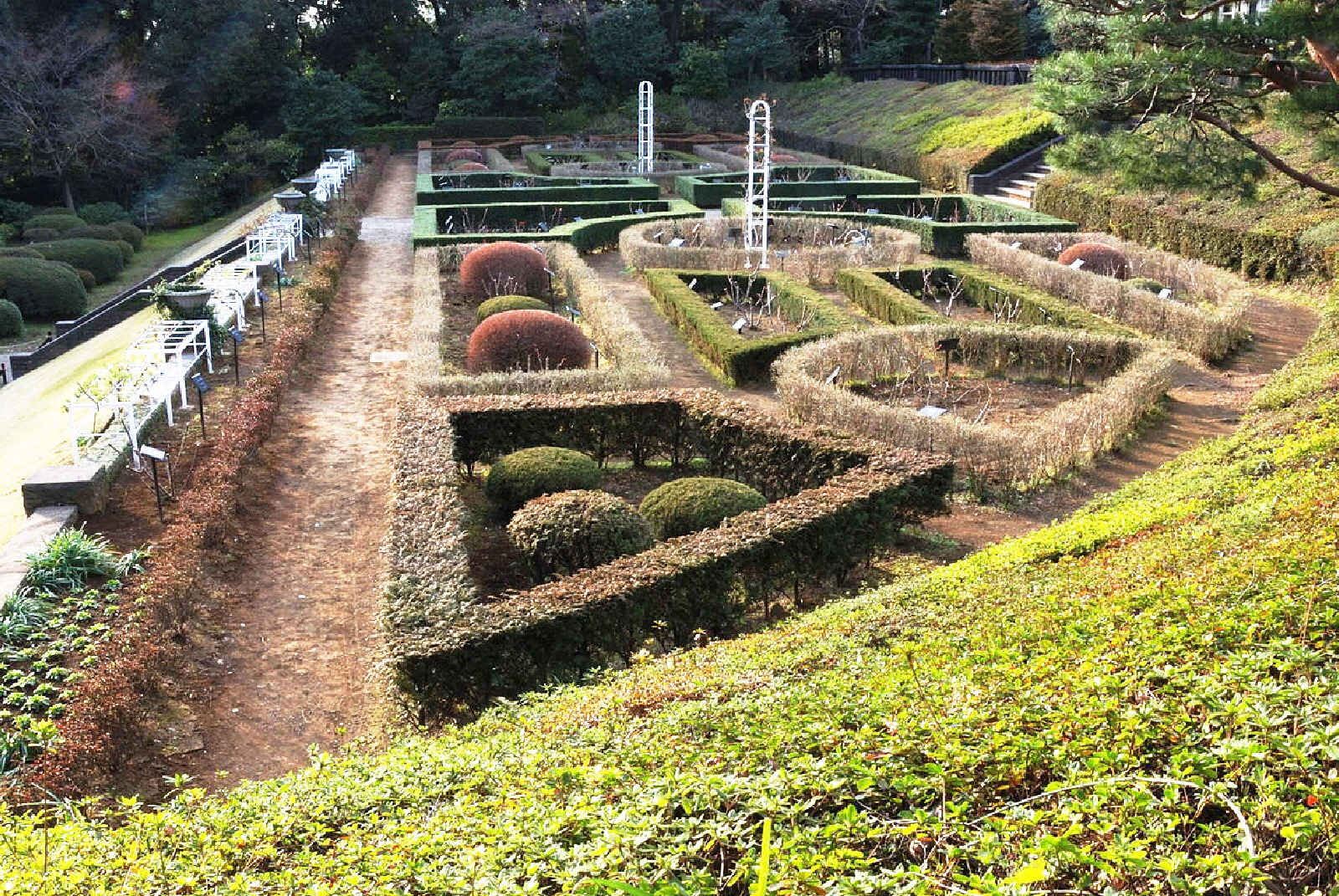
The rose garden is built on a slope and has a geometric structure.

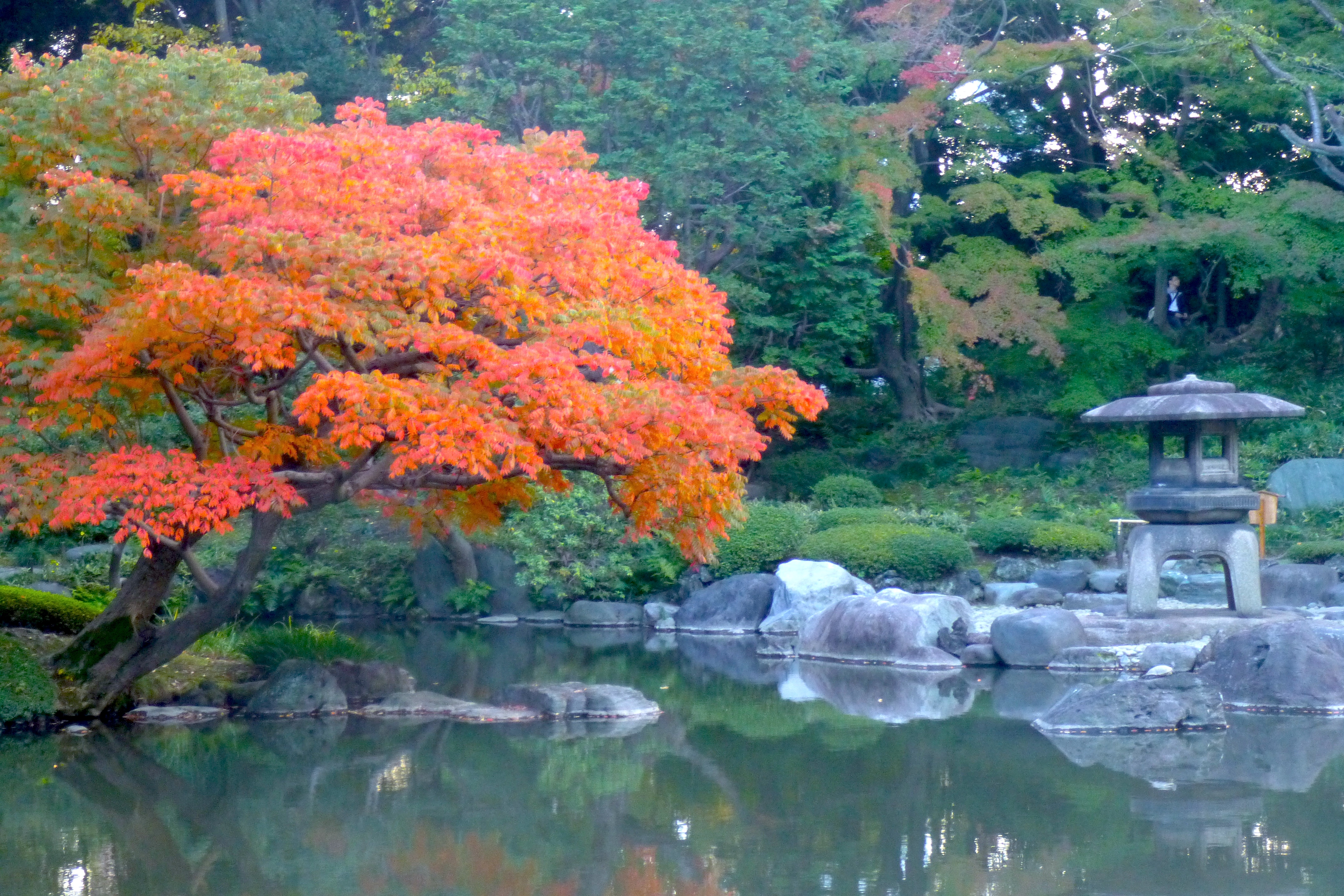
The Japanese garden, the pond. A tōrō on the right.

== Popular culture ==
The garden guesthouse features in the popular series Umineko When They Cry.

It is also featured in the first episode of the Super Sentai season Choujin Sentai Jetman.

== See also ==
- Parks and gardens in Tokyo
