= Nishigahara Station =

Metro station in Tokyo, Japan

Coordinates: 35.745938°N 139.742274°E

Nishigahara Station 西ケ原駅

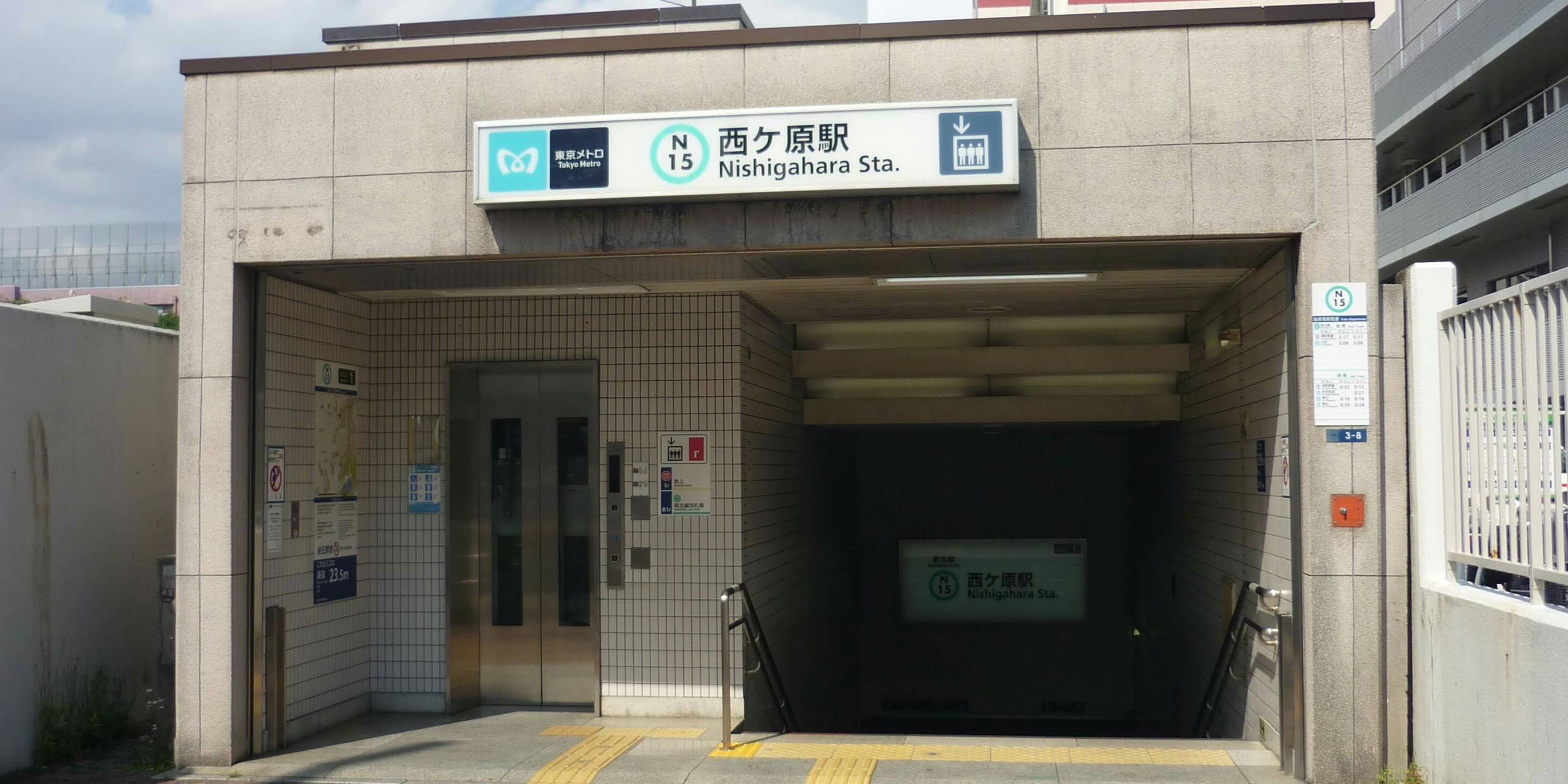
- Nishigahara station

General information
- Location: 2-3-8 Nishigahara, Kita, Tokyo; Japan
- Operator: Tokyo Metro
- Line: Namboku Line
- Platforms: 1 island platform
- Tracks: 2

Construction
- Structure type: Underground

Other information
- Station code: N-15

History
- Opened: 29 November 1991; 34 years ago

Passengers
- FY2013: 7,005 daily

Services
Preceding station	Tokyo Metro	Following station
Komagome towards Meguro	Namboku Line	Ōji towards Akabane-iwabuchi
Location
- Location within Tokyo Yamanote Loop Location within Tokyo wards area Location within Japan

Nishigahara Station (西ケ原駅, Nishigahara-eki) is a subway station in the Tokyo Metro network on the Tokyo Metro Namboku Line. It is numbered N-15 and is located in Kita, Tokyo. The station is the least used on the entire Metro network. Kyu-Furukawa Gardens can be reached by walking from this station.

== Lines ==
- Tokyo Metro Namboku Line (station number N-15)

== Platform ==
The platform is a simple island configuration, with one island platform serving two tracks.

1
Namboku Line
for Akabane-Iwabuchi
Saitama Rapid Railway Line for Urawa-Misono
2
- for Shirokane-takanawa and Meguro
- Meguro Line for Hiyoshi
- Tokyu Shin-Yokohama Line for Shin-Yokohama Station
- Sotetsu Main Line for Ebina via the Tokyu/Sotetsu Shin-Yokohama Line

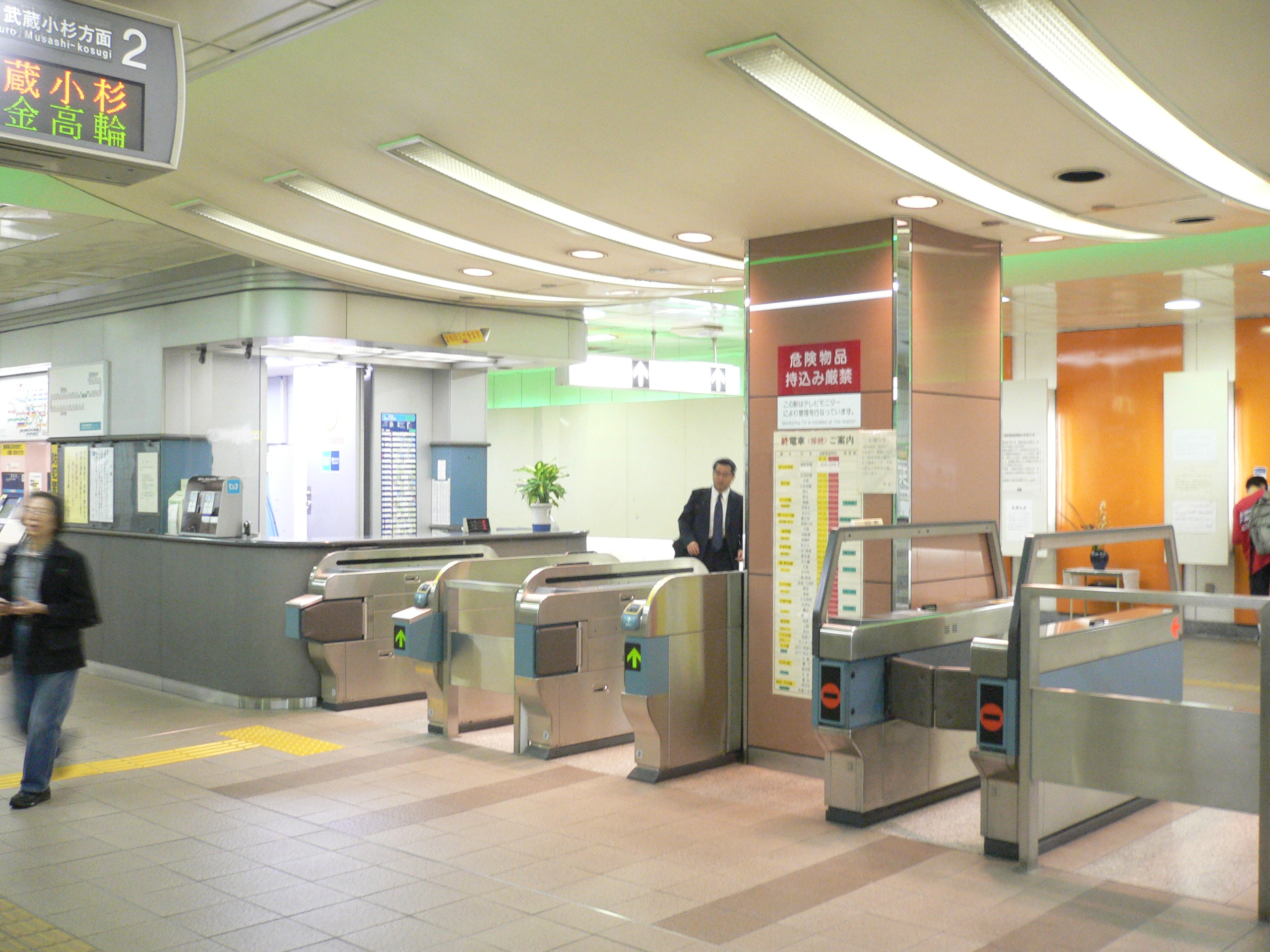
Ticket gate

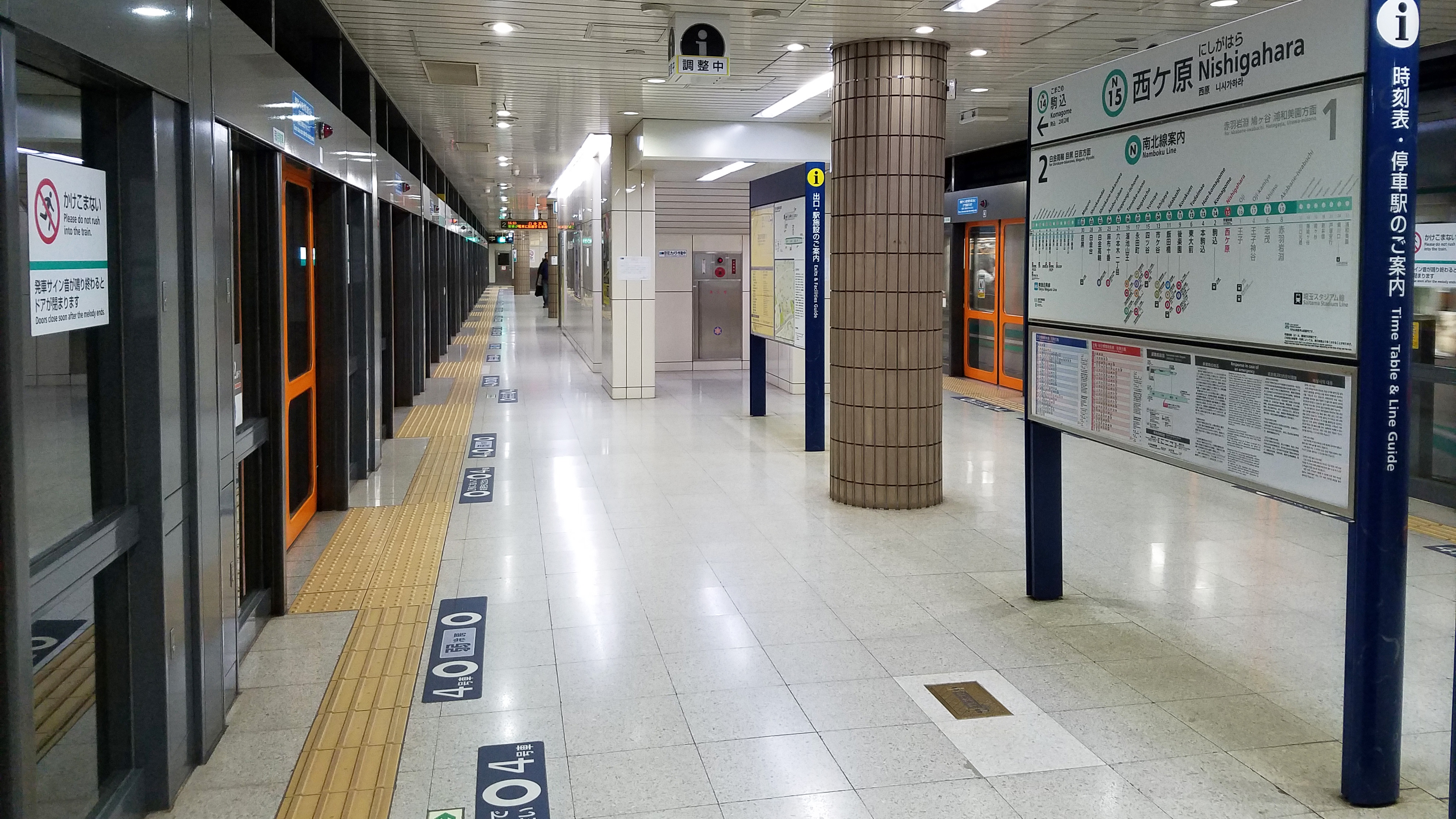
Platform

== Passenger statistics ==
With an average of 8,785 passengers daily in fiscal 2018, the station is the least used on the entire Tokyo Metro network and the only station on the network to have an average of less than 10,000 users per day.

The passenger statistics for previous years are as shown below.

Fiscal year	Daily average
2011	6,201
2012	6,469
2013	7,005
2014	7,747
2015	8,105
2016	8,383
2017	8,523
2018	8,785

== History ==
Nishigahara Station opened on 29 November 1991.

The station facilities were inherited by Tokyo Metro after the privatization of the Teito Rapid Transit Authority (TRTA) in 2004.
