= 栄町駅 =

栄町駅 is the name of multiple train stations in Japan:

- Sakaechō Station (disambiguation)
- Sakaemachi Station (disambiguation)
