= Arakawa-shakomae Station =

Tram station in Tokyo, Japan

Coordinates: 35.7509°N 139.7530°E

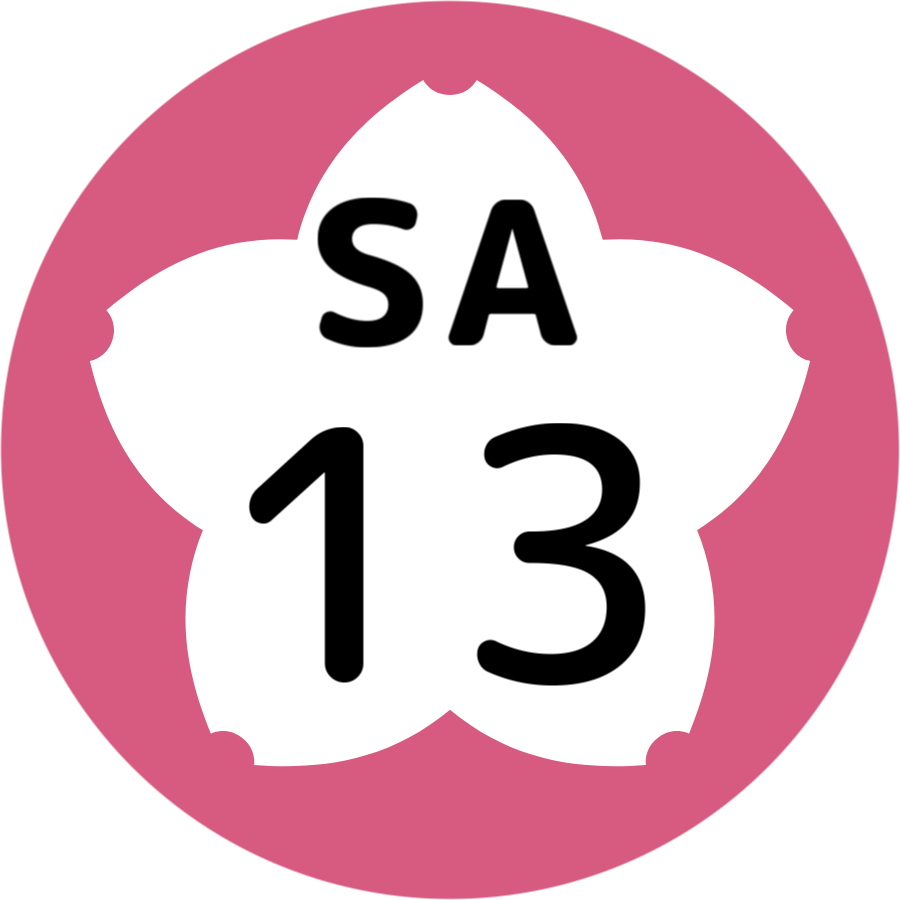
Arakawa-shakomae Station 荒川車庫前停留場

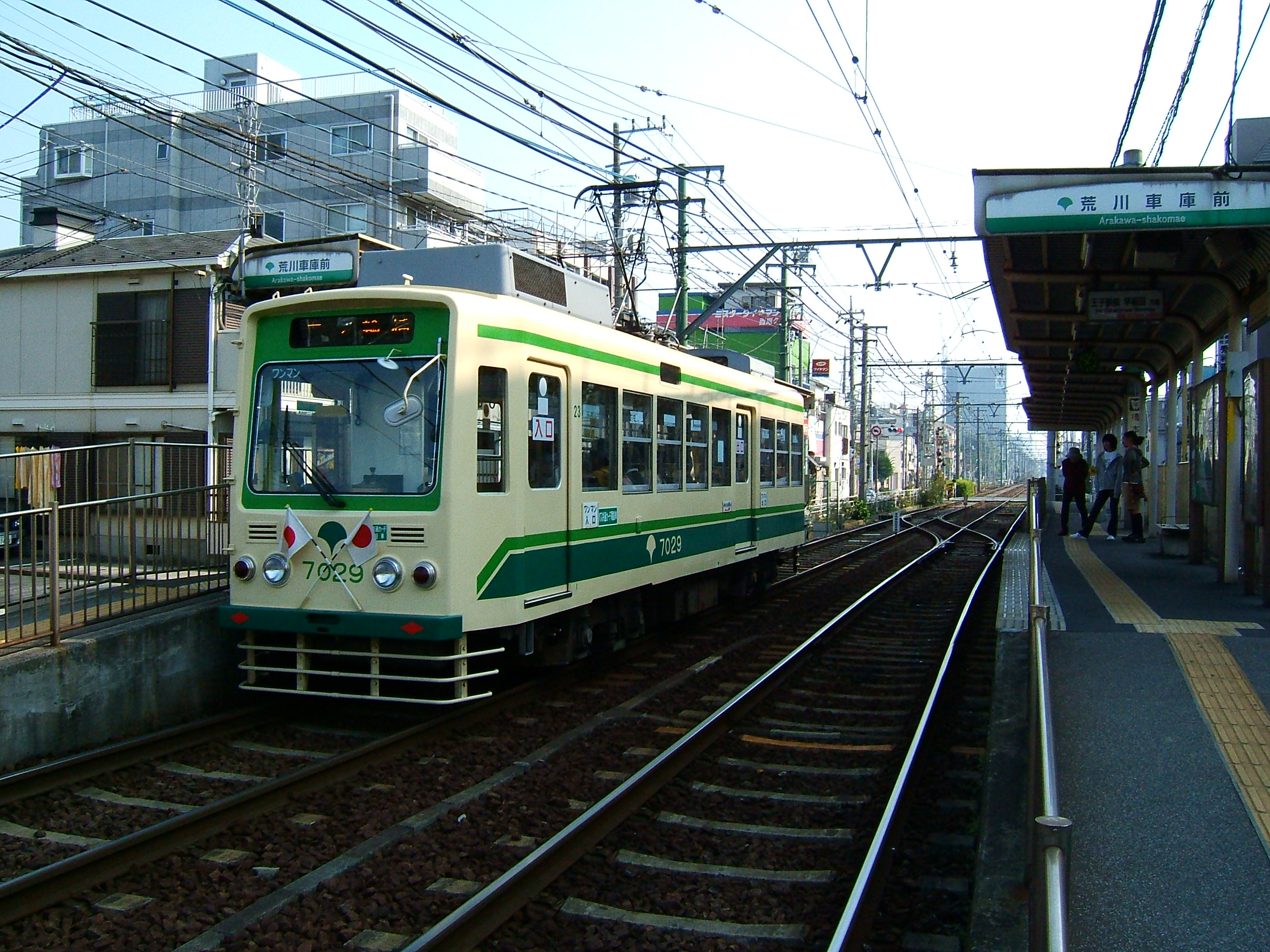
- The station in November 2006

General information
- Location: Nishiogu 7-chome and 8-chome, Arakawa Ward, Tokyo; Japan
- Operator: Toei
- Line: Toden Arakawa Line
- Distance: 4.6 km (2.9 mi) from Minowabashi
- Platforms: 3 side platforms
- Tracks: 2

Construction
- Structure type: At grade

Other information
- Station code: SA13

History
- Opened: 1 April 1913; 113 years ago
- Former names: Funakata-shakomae Station

Services
Preceding station	Toei	Following station
Kajiwara towards Waseda	Toden Arakawa Line	Arakawa-yūenchimae towards Minowabashi
Location
- Location within Special wards of Tokyo Location within Tokyo Bay and Bōsō Peninsula Location within Tokyo Location within Japan

Arakawa-shakomae Station (荒川車庫前停留場, Arakawa-shakomae-teiryūjō) is a tram station on the Tokyo Sakura Tram in Arakawa, Tokyo, Japan, operated by Tokyo Metropolitan Bureau of Transportation (Toei). It is 4.6 kilometres from the starting point of the Tokyo Sakura Tram at Minowabashi Station.

== Layout ==
Arakawa-shakomae Station has two opposed side platforms.

== History ==
The station opened on April 1, 1913.
