= Sakaechō Station =

Sakaechō Station (栄町駅) is the name of two train stations in Japan:

- Sakaechō Station (Chiba), on the Chiba Urban Monorail in Chūō-ku
- Sakaechō Station (Tokyo), a tram stop on the Tokyo Sakura Tram

== See also ==
- Sakaemachi Station (disambiguation), train stations in Japan with the same kanji but different pronunciation
