= Kajiwara Station =

Tram station in Tokyo, Japan

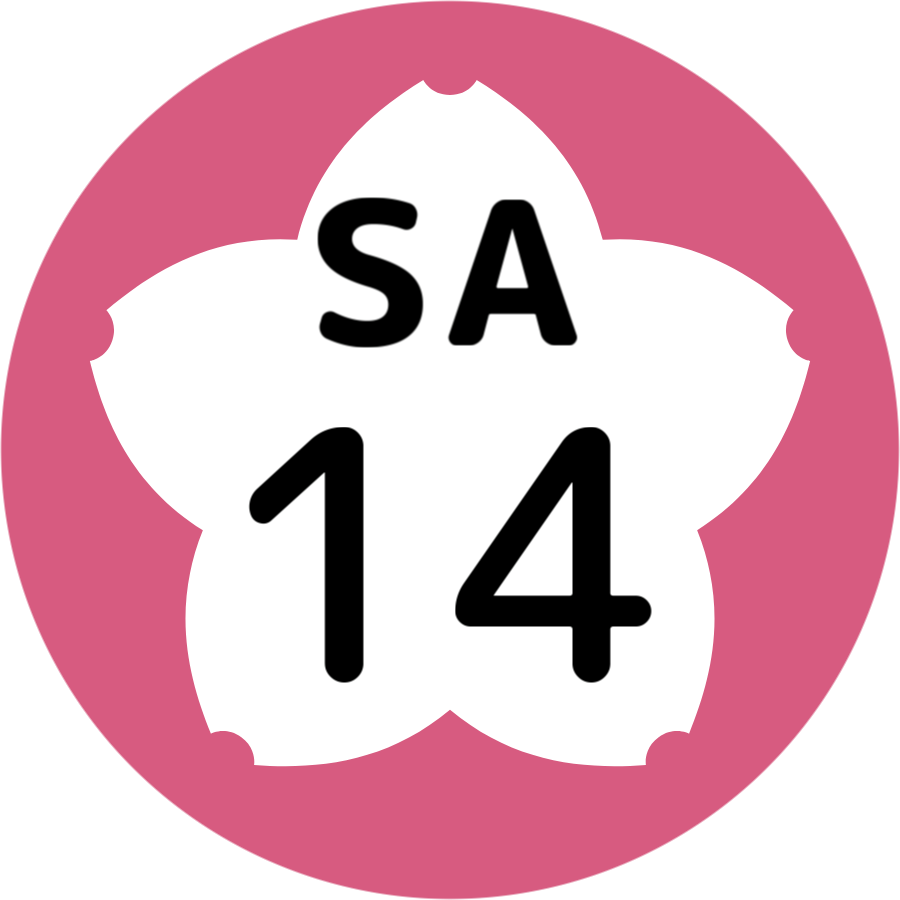
Kajiwara Station 梶原停留場

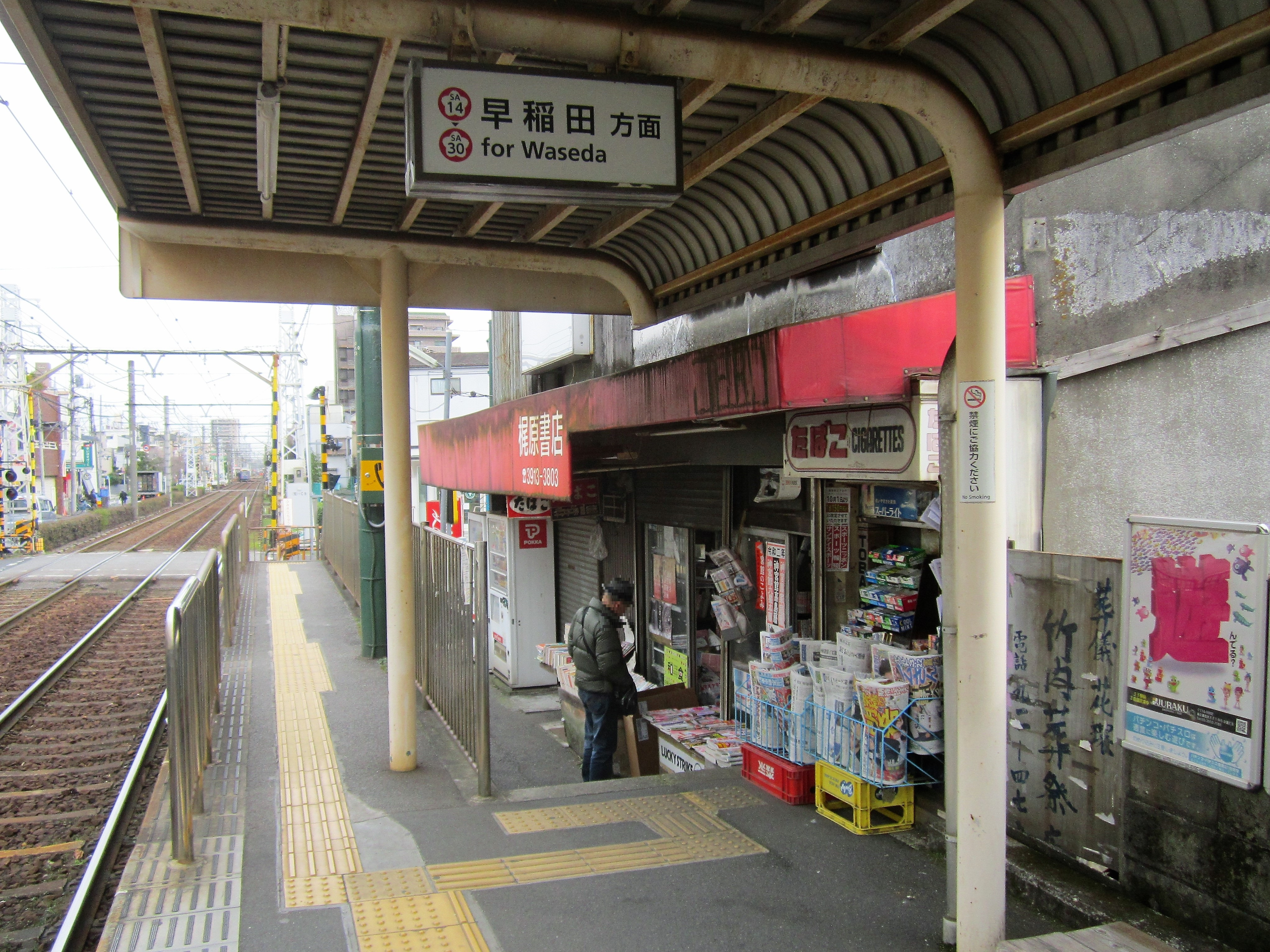
- Station Platforms in February 2020

General information
- Location: 3-chome Kaminakazato, Kita Ward, Tokyo; Japan
- Coordinates: 35°45′04″N 139°44′51″E
- Operator: Toei
- Line: Toden Arakawa Line
- Platforms: 2 side platforms
- Tracks: 2

Construction
- Structure type: At grade

Other information
- Station code: SA14

History
- Opened: 1 April 1913; 113 years ago

Services
Preceding station	Toei	Following station
Sakaechō towards Waseda	Toden Arakawa Line	Arakawa-shakomae towards Minowabashi
Location
- Location within Special wards of Tokyo Location within Tokyo Bay and Bōsō Peninsula Location within Tokyo Location within Japan

Kajiwara Station (梶原停留場, Kajiwara-teiryūjō) is a tram stop on the Tokyo Sakura Tram in Kita, Tokyo Japan.

== Lines ==
Kajiwara Station is served by Tokyo Sakura Tram.
