= Arakawa-yūenchimae Station =

Tram station in Tokyo, Japan

Coordinates: 35.7507°N 139.7580°E

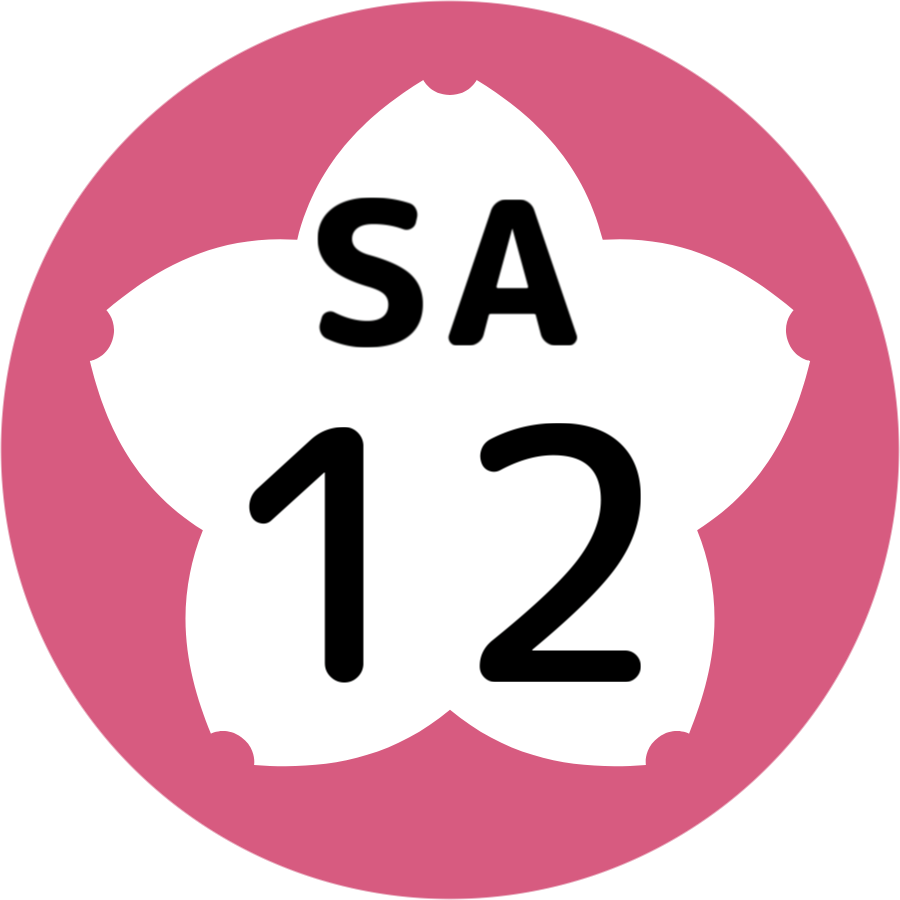
Arakawa-yuenchimae Station 荒川遊園地前停留場

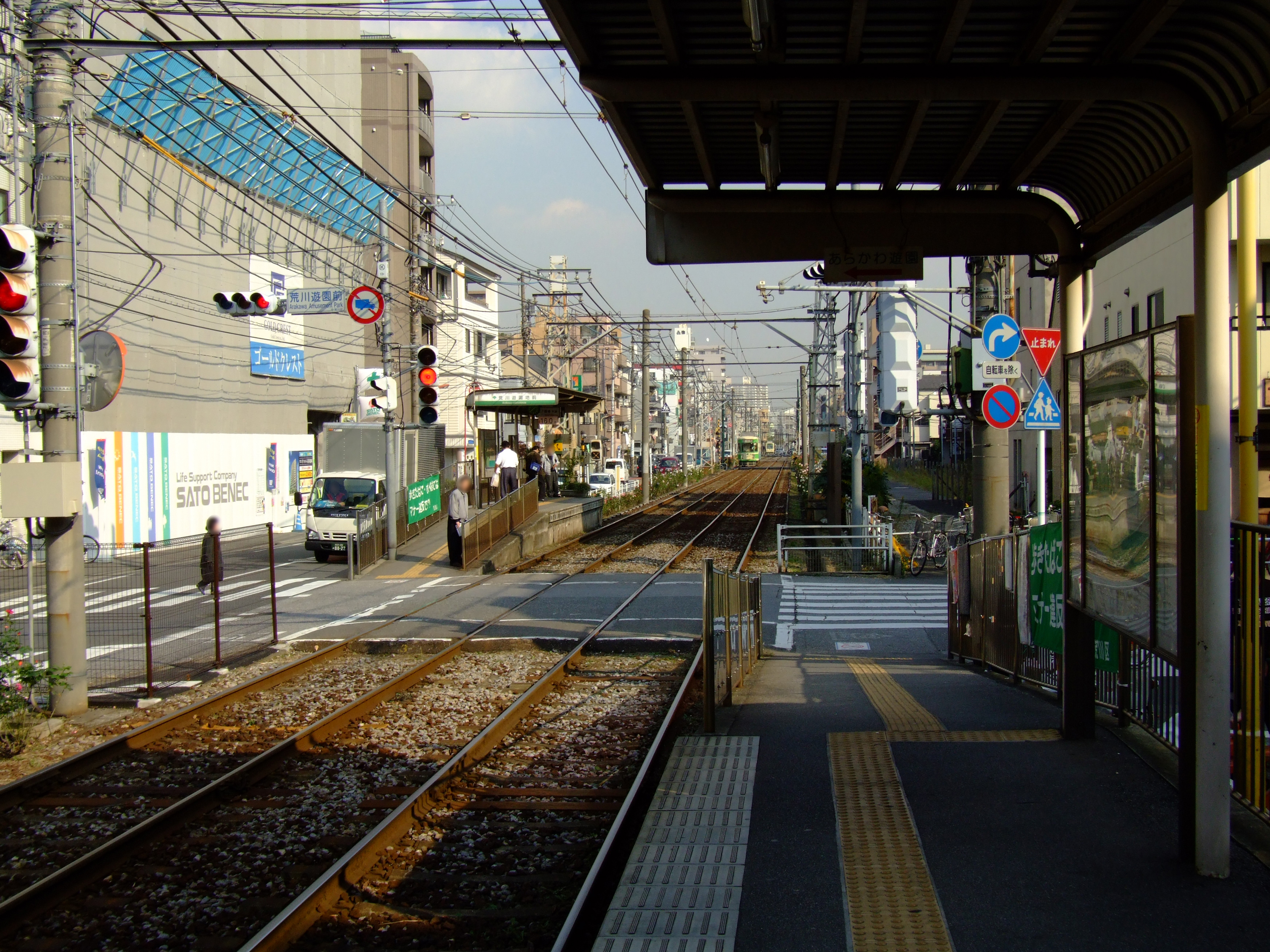

General information
- Location: Arakawa, Tokyo; Japan
- Operator: Toei
- Line: Toden Arakawa Line
- Platforms: 2 side platforms
- Tracks: 2

Construction
- Structure type: At grade

Other information
- Station code: SA12

History
- Opened: 1 April 1913; 113 years ago

Services
Preceding station	Toei	Following station
Arakawa-shakomae towards Waseda	Toden Arakawa Line	Odai towards Minowabashi
Location
- Location within Special wards of Tokyo Location within Tokyo Bay and Bōsō Peninsula Location within Tokyo Location within Japan

Arakawa-yuenchimae Station (荒川遊園地前停留場, Arakawa-yūenchimae-teiryūjō) is a tram station operated by Tokyo Metropolitan Bureau of Transportation's Tokyo Sakura Tram located in Arakawa, Tokyo, Japan. It is 4.1 kilometres from the terminus of the Tokyo Sakura Tram at Minowabashi Station.

== Layout ==
Arakawa-yuenchimae Station has two opposed side platforms.

== Surrounding area ==
- Arakawa-Yuen
- Sumida River
- Oku Station ( Utsunomiya and Takasaki Lines)

== History ==
- April 1, 1913: Station opened
