= Miyanomae Station =

Tram station in Tokyo, Japan

Coordinates: 35°45′0.4″N 139°45′53.9″E

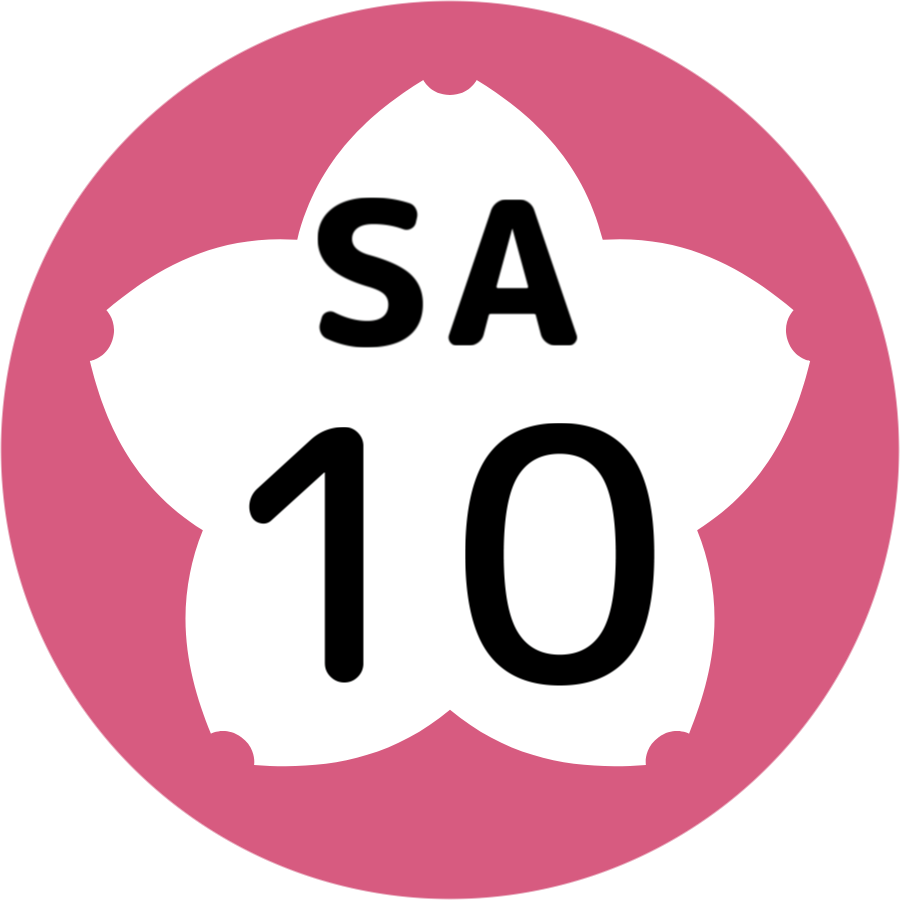
Miyanomae Station 宮ノ前停留場

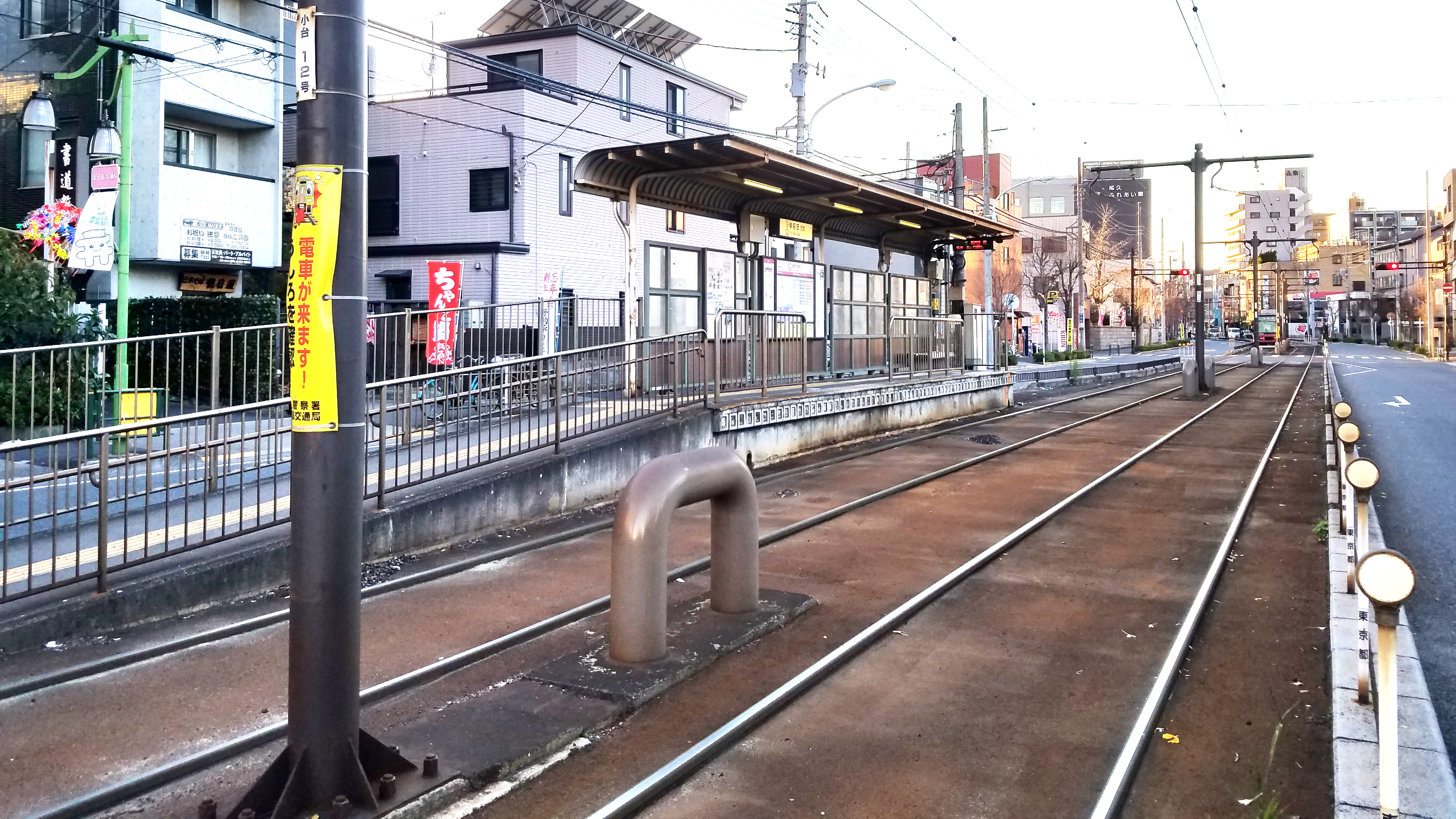
- The Waseda-bound platform in December 2018

General information
- Location: Nishiogu 2-chome, Arakawa Ward, Tokyo; Japan
- Operator: Toei
- Line: Toden Arakawa Line
- Platforms: 2 side platforms
- Tracks: 2

Construction
- Structure type: At grade

Other information
- Station code: SA10

History
- Opened: 1 April 1913; 113 years ago

Services
Preceding station	Toei	Following station
Odai towards Waseda	Toden Arakawa Line	Kumanomae towards Minowabashi
Location
- Location within Special wards of Tokyo Location within Tokyo Bay and Bōsō Peninsula Location within Tokyo Location within Japan

Miyanomae Station (宮ノ前停留場, Miyanomae-teiryūjō) is a tram stop on the Tokyo Sakura Tram.

== Lines ==
Miyanomae Station is served by the Tokyo Sakura Tram.
