= Odai Station (Tokyo) =

Tram station in Tokyo, Japan

Coordinates: 35°45′1.8″N 139°45′41.8″E

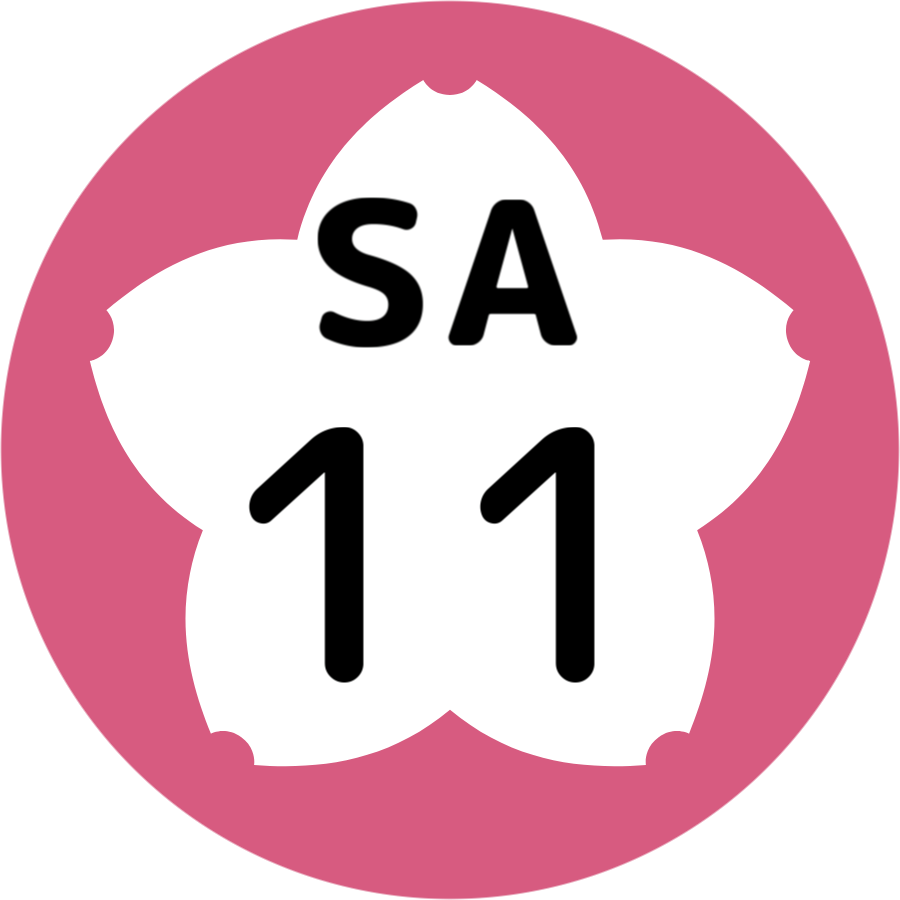
Odai Station 小台停留場

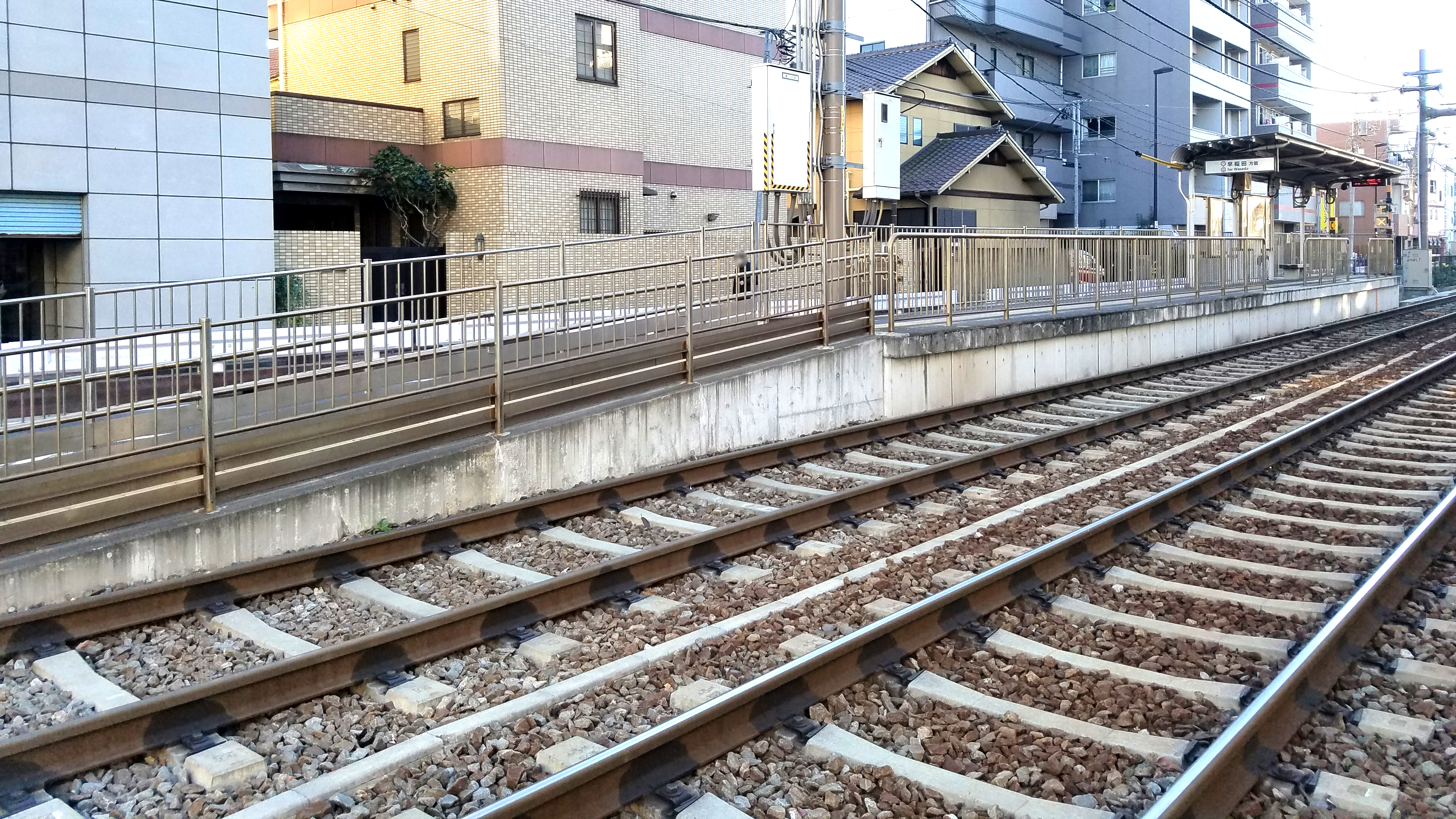
- The Waseda-bound platform in January 2021

General information
- Location: Nishiogu 5-chome, Arakawa Ward, Tokyo; Japan
- Operator: Toei
- Line: Toden Arakawa Line
- Platforms: 2 side platforms
- Tracks: 2

Construction
- Structure type: At grade

Other information
- Station code: SA11

History
- Opened: 1 April 1913; 113 years ago
- Closed: present

Services
| Preceding station | Toei | Following station |
|---|---|---|
| Arakawa-yūenchimae towards Waseda | Toden Arakawa Line | Miyanomae towards Minowabashi |
Location
- Location within Special wards of Tokyo Location within Tokyo Bay and Bōsō Peninsula Location within Tokyo Location within Japan

Odai Station (小台停留場, Odai-teiryūjō) is a tram stop on the Tokyo Sakura Tram.

== Lines ==
Odai Station is served by the Tokyo Sakura Tram.
