= Sakaemachi Station =

Sakaemachi Station is the name of train stations in Japan:

- Sakaemachi Station (Aichi)
- Sakaemachi Station (Hokkaido)
- Sakaemachi Station (Toyama)

== See also ==
- Sakae Station (Aichi) - Named Sakaemachi until 1966
- Sakaechō Station (disambiguation) - Train stations in Japan with the same kanji, but different pronunciation
