= Sakaechō Station (Tokyo) =

Tram station in Tokyo, Japan

Coordinates: 35°45′3.3″N 139°44′31.8″E

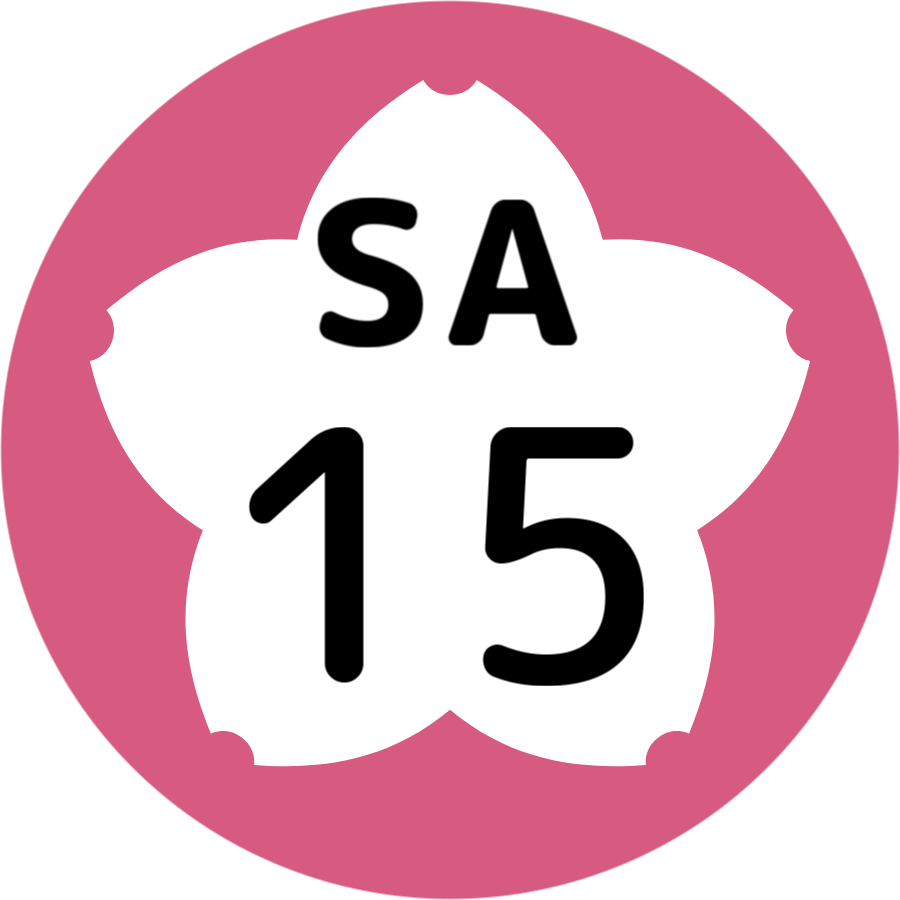
Sakaecho Station 栄町停留場

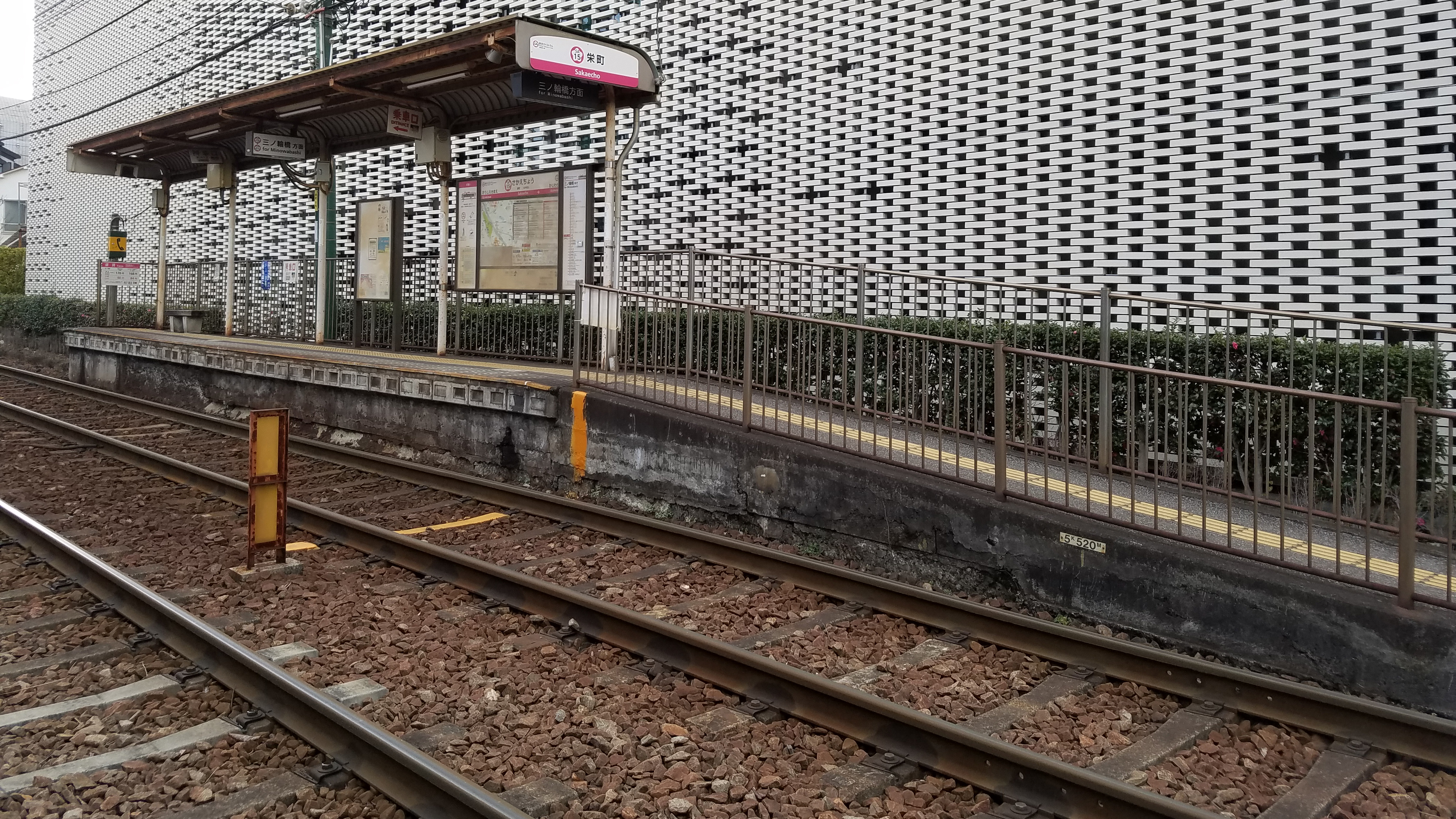
- The Minowabashi-bound platforms in February 2021

General information
- Location: Sakaechō, Kita Ward, Tokyo; Japan
- Operator: Toei
- Line: Toden Arakawa Line
- Platforms: 2 side platforms
- Tracks: 2

Construction
- Structure type: At grade

Other information
- Station code: SA15

History
- Opened: 13 October 1913; 113 years ago

Services
Preceding station	Toei	Following station
Ōji-ekimae towards Waseda	Toden Arakawa Line	Kajiwara towards Minowabashi
Location
- Location within Special wards of Tokyo Location within Tokyo Bay and Bōsō Peninsula Location within Tokyo Location within Japan

Sakaecho Station (栄町停留場, Sakaechō-teiryūjō) is a tram stop on the Tokyo Sakura Tram.

== Lines ==
Sakaecho Station is served by the Tokyo Sakura Tram.
