= Martha B. Briggs =

American educator

Martha Bailey Briggs
- Born: March 31, 1838. --> New Bedford, Massachusetts
- Died: March 28, 1889 (aged 50); Washington, DC
- Occupation: Educator

Martha Bailey Briggs (March 31, 1838 – March 28, 1889) was an American educator who was born and educated in New Bedford, Massachusetts, where she taught formerly enslaved men and women to read and write. In 1869, she moved to Washington, D.C., where she taught and served as a principal at Anthony Bowen Elementary School until 1873, when she began work at Howard University. At Howard, she trained teachers and taught math. In 1879, she was hired to serve as principal of the Miner Normal School. She stepped down from Miner Normal in 1883 and returned to Howard, where she served as principal of the Howard Normal Department until her death in 1889.

== Early life and career ==
Martha Bailey Briggs was born March 31, 1838, to John Briggs and Fannie Bassett Briggs, a black abolitionist family in New Bedford, Massachusetts. Shortly after his emancipation, Frederick Douglass worked with John Briggs in New Bedford. She was the first African American to graduate from her high school. She received teacher education at the Bridgewater Normal School. Her first teaching experience was in her father's home, tutoring formerly enslaved men and women, many of whom had escaped enslavement through the Underground Railroad. Her reputation as a teacher grew, and she was also hired to teach in small home-based schools in the region. In addition to teaching at the private school she began, she taught in a private school in Christiantown, Martha's Vineyard, and in public schools of Newport, Rhode Island. In 1859, Myrtilla Miner of Washington, D.C., invited Briggs to come to her "School for Colored Girls," but Briggs declined. Briggs briefly studied nursing at Boston Medical College but did not complete study. Briggs taught in Easton, Maryland, from 1862 to 1869.

== Career in Washington, DC ==
In 1869, Briggs moved to Washington, D.C., where she quickly became both teacher and principal at the Anthony Bowen Elementary School, which permitted children of color to attend. In 1873, Howard University hired her to teach in their mathematics and teacher preparation programs. Following Myrtilla Miner's death, Briggs left Howard to serve as principal of the Miner Normal School (now known as University of the District of Columbia) from 1879 until 1883. Briggs was the first African American woman to serve as principal of Miner Normal, and a Board of Education Report described her as: "a born teacher, and her work showed those qualities of head and heart that have made her name famous in the annals of education in the character of the graduates." Briggs was a member of the Monday Night Literary Club, a weekly gathering hosted by Frederick Douglass.

Briggs stepped down from her position with the Miner Normal School to work again for Howard University in 1883, a result of her poor health. She remained principal of the university's normal department until her death in 1889. A personnel roster for Howard lists her degree as D.D. She advocated for vocational as well as liberal arts education for people of color, and was elected president of the Industrial Institute Association of Washington, D.C., shortly before her death.

== Legacy ==
After her death on March 28, 1889, a group of citizens, led by Frederick Douglass, successfully petitioned that a DC school building be named the 'Martha B. Briggs Building' after her. Two District of Columbia schools were named after her: Briggs Elementary School in 1889 and Briggs-Montgomery Elementary School; however, both schools were torn down for other construction projects. A plaque was placed at the Howard University Chapel in her memory, with the inscription: "Her works do follow her." In 1920, a group of educators in New Bedford created the Martha Briggs Educational Club and student aid fund in her honor. In 1935, Briggs' former students gathered to honor her legacy as part of founders' day celebrations at Miner Teachers College.
