= List of women on United States postage stamps =

Chronological list of women and women-related subjects on United States postage stamps

This article lists women and women-related subjects on United States postage stamps. It includes named or identifiable women, groups of women, and certain collective subjects that the United States Postal Service (USPS) includes in its chronology of women-related stamp subjects. The USPS chronology also includes works created by women and issues concerning women's organizations, occupations, achievements, and social movements; consequently, not every entry is a biographical portrait.

The table is arranged by the first listed year of issue. Multiple years in one row indicate that the subject appeared on more than one United States stamp. Descriptions identify the subject's principal notability and are not intended as complete biographies.

== Full list ==
Name	Year Issued	Notable for
Isabella I of Castile	1893	Queen Isabella appeared with Christopher Columbus on a 4-dollar stamp. Her portrait is the first portrait of a woman to appear on a US postage stamp.
Martha Washington	1902, 1923, 1938	First First Lady of the United States
Pocahontas	1907	Pocahontas was a Native American woman and a member of the Powhatan peoples. She was an intermediary between the Native Americans and the nearby English colonists. She was taken captive by colonists, which culminated in 150 armed colonists going to Powhatan to demand ransom, burn down villages, and kill Native American men. Issued as a part of the Jamestown Exposition Issue.
Molly Pitcher	1928	The nickname of a woman, whose identity is not definitively known, who is said to have fought in the American Revolutionary War
Anna McNeill Whistler	1934	Mother of American-born painter James Abbott McNeill Whistler
Susan B. Anthony	1936, 1955	American feminist, social reformer, and civil rights activist
Virginia Dare	1937	First European child born on American soil
Louisa May Alcott	1940	American author, best known for writing Little Women and Little Men
Frances Willard	1940	American educator, reformer, lecturer, and women's suffrage supporter
Jane Addams	1940	American social worker and reformer, the founder of Hull House in Chicago, a social welfare center
Clara Barton	1948, 1995	Founder of the American Red Cross
Juliette Gordon Low	1948	Founder of the Girl Scouts of the USA
Moina Michael	1948	Initiated the Veterans of Foreign Wars fundraising drive selling red poppies in 1915
Elizabeth Cady Stanton	1948	American writer, suffragist, and leader in the women's rights movement in the U.S. during the mid- to late-19th century
Betsy Ross	1952	American upholsterer credited with creating the first official flag of the United States
Sacagawea	1954, 1994	Shoshone guide who assisted the Lewis and Clark Expedition of 1804
Amelia Earhart	1963	American pilot, first woman to fly solo nonstop across the Atlantic Ocean
Eleanor Roosevelt	1963, 1984, 1998	American diplomat, writer, social reformer, and First Lady of the United States
Mary Cassatt	1966, 1988, 1998	American painter best known for her works of mothers and children
Lucy Stone	1968	Nineteenth century abolitionist and women's rights leader
Grandma Moses	1969	American painter who took up painting at the age of 76
Emily Dickinson	1971	American poet who wrote more than 1,700 poems
Willa Cather	1973	American novelist
Elizabeth Blackwell	1973	American physician, the first female physician in the U.S.
Sybil Ludington	1975	American-born heroine of the American Revolutionary War
Clara Maass	1976	American nurse best known for having died as a volunteer for yellow fever medical experiments
Harriet Tubman	1978, 1995	American abolitionist and social activist who was part of the Underground Railroad
Emily Bissell	1980	American social worker and activist best known for introducing Christmas Seals to the United States
Helen Keller	1980	American author and disability rights advocate
Anne Sullivan	1980	American teacher best known for being the instructor and lifelong companion of Helen Keller
Dolley Madison	1980	First Lady of the United States
Frances Perkins	1980	American workers-rights advocate and fourth United States Secretary of Labor, the first female to hold a cabinet-level position in the United States government
Blanche Scott	1980	Inventor and pioneering aviator
Edith Wharton	1980	American novelist best known for her novels Ethan Frome and The Age of Innocence
Rachel Carson	1981	American marine biologist, writer, and conservationist, best known for writing Silent Spring in advance of the environmental movement
Edna St. Vincent Millay	1981	American poet
Babe Didrikson Zaharias	1981	American multi-sport athlete
Ethel Barrymore	1982	American film actress
Mary Walker	1982	American abolitionist, prohibitionist, prisoner of war, and surgeon, the only woman to receive the Medal of Honor
Dorothea Dix	1983	American advocate for the indigent mentally ill
Pearl S. Buck	1983	American writer and novelist, best known for the novel, The Good Earth
Lillian Moller Gilbreth	1984	American psychologist and industrial engineer, a pioneer in the field of time-and-motion studies
Abigail Adams	1985	First Lady of the United States
Mary McLeod Bethune	1985	American educator, social activist, and founder of the Daytona Educational and Industrial Training School for Negro Girls, now known as Bethune-Cookman College
Belva Ann Lockwood	1986	American politician, the first female candidate for President of the United States
Margaret Mitchell	1986	American novelist and journalist, best known for the novel Gone with the Wind
Sojourner Truth	1986	Born Isabella Baumfree, she was the first black woman to speak publicly against slavery.
Julia Ward Howe	1987	Composer of "The Battle Hymn of the Republic".
Mary Lyon	1987	Education pioneer who founded Mount Holyoke College.
Mary Cassatt	1988, 2003	American artist known for her portraits of motherhood
Evelyn Nesbit	1989	American chorus girl, artists' model, actress and controversial historical figure.
Judy Garland	1989	American actress and singer; depicted as Dorothy in The Wizard of Oz
Helene Madison	1990	American swimmer and Olympic gold medalist.
Marianne Moore	1990	Poet who won the Pulitzer Prize in 1951 for her Collected Poems.
Ida B. Wells	1990	Civil rights activist who cofounded the National Association for the Advancement of Colored People.
Hazel Hotchkiss Wightman	1990	Olympic gold medalist credited with doing more to build American and international women's tennis than any other player.
Fanny Brice	1991	Singer and comedian who created the "Baby Snooks" radio character.
Harriet Quimby	1991	First American woman pilot to fly the English Channel.
Dorothy Parker	1992	Poet and short story writer
Patsy Cline	1993	Popular American country singer
Sara Carter and Maybelle Carter of the Carter Family	1993	Pioneers of American country music
Grace Kelly	1993	American film actress
Dinah Washington	1993	"Queen of the Blues"
Clara Bow	1994	Silent film actress
ZaSu Pitts	1994	Silent film actress
Theda Bara	1994	Silent film actress
Nellie Cashman	1994	The "Angel of Tombstone", an anti-violence advocate who raised orphans and campaigned against public hanging
Ethel Waters	1994	American jazz, swing, and pop singer and actress
Bessie Smith	1994	American blues singer
Billie Holiday	1994	American jazz and swing singer
Mildred Bailey	1994	Native American jazz singer
Ethel Merman	1994	American actress and singer of musical comedy
Annie Oakley	1994	American sharpshooter
Virginia Apgar	1994	Doctor who developed a newborn assessment method
Ruth Benedict	1995	American anthropologist
Mary Boykin Chesnut	1995	American Civil War author
Phoebe Pember	1995	American nurse and hospital administrator for Confederate States military hospital
Bessie Coleman	1995	First woman to earn an international pilot's license
Alice Hamilton	1995	Pioneer in industrial medicine
Marilyn Monroe	1995	American film actor
Alice Paul	1995	Founder of National Women's Party and author of the Equal Rights Amendment
Jacqueline Cochran	1996	Pioneer pilot who had more than 200 aviation records, firsts, and awards. She was the first woman to break the sound barrier
Georgia O'Keeffe	1996, 2013	American-born abstract painter
Dorothy Fields	1996	Popular songwriter of the 1920s and 1930s. She wrote the words for "On the Sunny Side of the Street"
Lily Pons	1997	French-American operatic soprano and actress
Rosa Ponselle	1997	American operatic soprano
Women in the military	1997	This stamp honored the nearly 2 million women have served and are serving in the U.S. armed forces
Mary Breckinridge	1998	Founder of the Frontier Nursing Service
Mahalia Jackson	1998	American gospel singer
Roberta Martin	1998	American gospel composer, singer, pianist, arranger, and choral organizer
Sister Rosetta Tharpe	1998	American singer and guitarist
Florence Owens Thompson	1998	American depression-era woman who was the subject of a photograph by American photographer Dorothea Lange entitled "Migrant Mother" which was featured on a US postage stamp
Clara Ward	1998	American gospel singers
Margaret Mead	1998	Famous anthropologist who studied child rearing, personality, and culture, mainly in the South Pacific
Madam C. J. Walker	1998	African American who became one of the wealthiest women in the 1910s by developing and selling hair care products
Lila Acheson Wallace	1998	American magazine publisher and philanthropist; co-founder of Reader's Digest
Ayn Rand	1999	Author of the novels The Fountainhead and Atlas Shrugged
Lucille Ball	1999, 2001, 2009	American comedian and actress
Lynn Fontanne	1999	English actress
Patricia Roberts Harris	2000	Lawyer and political adviser; in 1977 she became the first African American woman named to a presidential cabinet
Louise Nevelson	2000	Twentieth-century American sculptor who worked with wood, metals, and found objects
Hattie Wyatt Caraway	2001	First woman elected to U.S. Senate
Rose O'Neill	2001	American illustrator
Frida Kahlo	2001	Mexican artist
Neysa McMein	2001	American illustrator and portrait painter
Nellie Bly (Elizabeth Cochrane Seaman)	2002	American journalist known for her 72-day trip around the globe and her pioneering work in investigative journalism
Marguerite Higgins	2002	American reporter and war correspondent
Ethel L. Payne	2002	American journalist, editor, and foreign correspondent
Ida Tarbell	2002	American writer, journalist, and lecturer, famous as a muckraking reporter of the late 19th and early 20th centuries
Agnes Lee and her daughter Peggy	2002	American author and, with her daughter, the subject of a photograph by American photographer Gertrude Käsebier featured on a US postage stamp
Ida Pabst	2002	Daughter-in-law of Frederick Pabst (the German-American brewer for whom Pabst Brewing Company was named) and the subject of a portrait by American photographer Imogen Cunningham which was featured on a US postage stamp
Edna Ferber	2002	American author of novels, short stories, and plays
Zora Neale Hurston	2003	African American novelist in the Harlem Renaissance
Audrey Hepburn	2003	Film actress and goodwill ambassador for UNICEF
Agnes de Mille	2004	American dancer and choreographer
Martha Graham	2004	American modern dancer and choreographer
Wilma Rudolph	2004	Track and field star
Marian Anderson	2005	Opera singer who was the first African-American to sing at the Metropolitan Opera
Greta Garbo	2005	Actress of the silver screen
Barbara McClintock	2005	American geneticist
Hattie McDaniel	2006	Singer and actress who was the first African-American to win an Oscar
Frances E. Willis	2006	Diplomat
Judy Garland	2006	Actress and singer, star of A Star is Born
Katherine Anne Porter	2006	American author and journalist
Ella Fitzgerald	2007	Jazz singer
Margaret Chase Smith	2007	American Congresswoman and Senator from Maine, the first woman to serve in both houses of the US Congress
Harriet Beecher Stowe	2007	American author and abolitionist, best known for writing Uncle Tom's Cabin
Gerty Cori	2008	Biochemist
Bette Davis	2008	American actress
Martha Gellhorn	2008	Journalist who covered the Spanish Civil War, World War II, and the Vietnam War
Marjorie Kinnan Rawlings	2008	Pulitzer Prize-winning author of The Yearling
Freda Josephine Baker	2008	African American dancer, activist, and spy during World War II. She succeeded as a dancer in Vaudeville, participated in the Harlem Renaissance, and eventually moved to Paris where she was very well received. During World War II, helped the French military by passing on secrets she learned while performing.
Mary Church Terrell	2009	Civil rights and women's rights activist
Mary White Ovington	2009	Civil rights activist
Daisy Bates	2009	Civil rights activist
Fannie Lou Hamer	2009	Civil rights activist
Ella Baker	2009	Civil rights activist
Ruby Hurley	2009	Civil rights activist
Mary Lasker	2009	Health activist and philanthropist
Anna J. Cooper	2009	African-American scholar
Vivian Vance	2009	American actress and singer
Dinah Shore	2009	American singer, actress, and television personality
Fran Allison	2009	American comedian, singer, and TV and radio personality
Gracie Allen	2009	American vaudevillian, singer, actress, and comedian
Harriet Nelson	2009	American singer and actress
Katharine Hepburn	2010	American actress
Kate Smith	2010	American contralto singer
Mother Teresa	2010	Albanian-born Indian Catholic nun canonized as a Catholic saint in 2016, best known for her life devoted to charitable work
Julia de Burgos	2010	Puerto Rican pro-independence poet
Carmen Miranda	2011	Portuguese-born Brazilian-American samba singer, dancer, and actress
Selena	2011	American Tejano singer
Celia Cruz	2011	Cuban-American singer
Oveta Culp Hobby	2011	First secretary of the US Department of Health, Education and Welfare, first commanding officer of the Women's Army Corps
Maria Goeppert Mayer	2011	German-born American theoretical physicist
Helen Hayes	2011	American actress
Greta von Nessen	2011	Swedish-born American industrial designer
Barbara Jordan	2011	American politician and a leader of the Civil Rights Movement
Elizabeth Bishop	2012	American poet and short-story author
Gwendolyn Brooks	2012	American poet, author, and teacher
Denise Levertov	2012	British-born American poet
Sylvia Plath	2012	American poet and author
Édith Piaf	2012	French singer
Isadora Duncan	2012	American dancer and choreographer
Katherine Dunham	2012	American dancer and choreographer
Lady Bird Johnson	2012	First Lady of the United States
Rosa Parks	2013	Civil rights activist
Lydia Mendoza	2013	Latin music legend
Althea Gibson	2013	Tennis player
Shirley Chisholm	2014	Politician - first African-American woman elected to the U.S. Congress
Janis Joplin	2014	Singer and songwriter
Julia Child	2014	Chef, author, television personality
Joyce Chen	2014	Chef, author, television personality
Edna Lewis	2014	Chef, author
Maya Angelou	2015	Poet, author and civil rights activist
Flannery O'Connor	2015	Writer
Ingrid Bergman	2015	Actress
Sarah Vaughan	2016	Singer
Shirley Temple	2016	Actress, later businesswoman and diplomat
Dorothy Height	2017	Civil rights and women's rights activist
Lena Horne	2018	Singer, dancer, actress and civil rights activist
Sally Ride	2018	Astronaut, engineer, physicist
Gwen Ifill	2020	Journalist; first African-American woman to host a major political talk show: PBS's "Washington Week in Review" in 1999
Chien-Shiung Wu	2021	Nuclear physicist
Edmonia Lewis	2022	Sculptor; first African-American and Native American sculptor to earn international recognition
Eugenie Clark	2022	American ichthyologist
Nancy Reagan	2022	First Lady of the United States
Women Cryptologists of World War II	2022	Honoring the around 11,000 women cryptologists of World War II who helped decipher enemy military messages.
Women's Soccer	2023	Celebrating women's soccer in the United States, from youth leagues to the world champion U.S. national team.
Ruth Bader Ginsburg	2023	US Supreme Court justice, 2nd woman to sit on the U.S. Supreme Court
Toni Morrison	2023	Award-winning author of 11 novels that brought to life the diverse voices of Black people and, in particular, centered the identity of Black women.
Constance Baker Motley	2024	The first African American woman to argue a case before the U.S. Supreme Court and the first to serve as a federal judge. A master legal tactician, Motley played a key role in knocking down legal segregation.
Harriet Tubman	2024	Part of the Underground Railroad series, another forever stamp honors Harriet Tubman.
Harriet Jacobs	2024	An American abolitionist and autobiographer who crafted her own experiences into her autobiography, Incidents in the Life of a Slave Girl, Written by Herself (1861). Part of the Underground Railroad series.
Catherine White Coffin	2024	An American Quaker abolitionist and the wife of Levi Coffin, the unofficial "President of the Underground Railroad". Part of the Underground Railroad series.
Laura Haviland	2024	An American Quaker abolitionist, suffragette, and social reformer. Part of the Underground Railroad series.
Betty Ford	2024	First lady of the United States from 1974 to 1977. She was noted for raising breast cancer awareness and being a passionate supporter of the Equal Rights Amendment.
Betty White	2025	American actress and comedian.
Barbara Bush	2025	First lady of the United States
Phillis Wheatley	2026	The first African American woman to get a book published in the American Colonies

== See also ==
- Women on US stamps
- List of people on the postage stamps of the United States
- Postage stamps and postal history of the United States
- Black Heritage series
