= Aloncita Johnson Flood =

American clubwoman

- Aloncita Johnson Flood, from a 1945 newspaper
- Born: December 4, 1905; Washington, D.C., US
- Died: August 23, 1973 (aged 67); New York, US
- Occupations: Clubwoman, city official
- Spouse: Roger William Flood (m. 1928)

Aloncita Johnson Flood (December 4, 1905 – August 23, 1973) was an American clubwoman, community leader, and New York City official, based for most of her career in Harlem.

== Early life ==
Aloncita Johnson was born in Washington, D.C., the eldest daughter of Walter W. Johnson and Mary L. Johnson. Both of her parents were from Virginia; her father was a barber, and her mother was a hairdresser. She trained as a teacher at Miner Normal College (now known as University of the District of Columbia) in Washington.

== Career ==
Flood taught school in Annapolis for three years as a young woman. During World War II, Flood was a substitute teacher in New York, and was active with the Harlem Defense Recreation Center, the American Red Cross, the Harlem River Residents' Association, and other community organizations, hosting events and fundraisers. She was a charter member of the Harlem District Committee of the Community Service Society of New York from 1939, and served as the committee's chair in 1944.

Flood was elected treasurer of the New York Chapter of the NAACP in 1956, and vice president in 1958; she was the organization's life membership representative after that. She was elected North Atlantic Regional Director of Alpha Kappa Alpha in 1959, served as president (basileus) of one of the sorority's New York chapters, and served on the sorority's international board of directors from 1962 to 1966. She wrote Alpha Kappa Alpha Sorority: Volunteers in Community Service (1966). She was also director of teen girls at the Harlem YWCA.

Flood was an executive with the Manpower and Employment Agency of New York City in the 1960s. In 1968 she testified before a hearing of the Equal Employment Opportunity Commission, on racial bias in white collar jobs.

== Personal life ==
In 1928, Aloncita Johnson married businessman and public housing official Roger William Flood. He died in 1974, aged 70.

Aloncita Johnson Flood died in 1973, aged 67 years, at Sydenham Hospital in New York. In 2007, she was named to the Hall of Fame of the Lambda chapter of Alpha Kappa Alpha.
