= Calvin Jones Big Band Jazz Festival =

Usually held the last Monday evening in April, the Calvin Jones BIG BAND Jazz Festival features big band jazz ensembles from three Washington, D.C. area universities - University of the District of Columbia (UDC), Howard University, and the University of Maryland. Both traditional and contemporary big band jazz arrangements make up the programs of the three ensembles.

Produced by the UDC Jazz Studies Program and the Felix E. Grant Jazz Archives, the festival began in 1987 as part of a citywide tribute to Duke Ellington and was originally called the University BIG BAND Jazz Festival. In 2004 the official name of the festival was changed to the Calvin Jones BIG BAND Jazz Festival, in memory of Calvin Jones, director of UDC's Jazz Studies program and a legendary figure in the Washington, D.C. community.

In subsequent years the festival has been organized as A Tribute to Count Basie (1988); A Celebration of the 25th Anniversary of the Consortium of Universities of the Washington Metropolitan Area (1991); A Tribute to Dizzy Gillespie and Dr. George Ross (1993); and A Tribute to Felix Grant (1994). April 1996 marked the 10th Anniversary of the festival, and in 1999, UDC joined the city in celebrating the 100th Anniversary of Duke Ellington's birth. Since 2002 the festival has celebrated Jazz appreciation month (JAM) - an initiative launched by the Smithsonian Institution that serves as an annual affirmation of jazz. April 2006's festival marked the first with the new logo. On Monday, April 28, 2008, the jazz ensembles from the University of the District of Columbia (directed by Allyn Johnson), Howard University (directed by Fred Irby III) and the University of Maryland (directed by Chris Vadala) celebrate the festival's 22nd year.

BET on Jazz, the Cable Jazz Channel taped the 1998 festival and aired the program on BET on Jazz's-Jazz Scene. Washington D.C.'s Jazz Messenger-WPFW 89.3 FM broadcasts the festival live. UDC Cable Television in cooperation with the D.C. Office of Cable Television and Telecommunications tapes the festival for broadcast on UDC Cable Television. These broadcasts continue to give exposure to a festival that has been supported by area audiences since 1987.
