= Calvin Jones (musician) =

American jazz musician

- Born: September 27, 1929; Chicago, Illinois, U.S.
- Died: October 10, 2004 (aged 75) Washington, D.C., U.S.
- Genres: Jazz
- Instruments: Trombone, piano, bass

Calvin James Jones, Sr. (September 27, 1929 – October 10, 2004) was an American jazz and blues trombonist, bassist, pianist, composer, and educator. Born in Chicago, Illinois, and raised in Memphis, Tennessee, Jones moved to Washington, D.C. in the 1970s, and remained there until his death from a heart attack in October 2004.

== See also ==
- Chicago Blues Festival
- Calvin Jones BIG BAND Jazz Festival
