= West A. Hamilton =

American teacher (1886–1985)

West Alexander Hamilton
- Born: c. 1886
- Died: December 22, 1985
- Education: Miner Teachers College, American University
- Occupations: Teacher, military officer, newspaper publisher, civic leader

Col. West Alexander Hamilton (c. 1886 – 1985) was an American teacher, military officer, newspaper publisher, and civic leader. He served as a United States Army's colonel, and was a veteran of World War I and World War II. He had served for 22 years on the District of Columbia School Board (now District of Columbia State Board of Education).

== Early life and education ==
West A. Hamilton was the son of John A. Hamilton and Julia West Hamilton, a prominent community leader.

He graduated from Dunbar High School in Washington, D.C., and Miner Teachers College (now the University of the District of Columbia). He received a master's degree from American University in 1955.

== Career ==
In 1905, Hamilton enlisted in the United States National Guard. He served with the 10th Cavalry Regiment of Buffalo Soldiers and during World War I.

He and his brother Percival Y. Hamilton established the Hamilton Printing Company in 1910 in Washington, D.C.; it published the Washington Sentinel newspaper. They advertised in The Crisis.

He served on the District of Columbia School Board (now District of Columbia State Board of Education).

In 1928, he spoke before a congressional committee in favor of a museum and gathering place in Washington, D.C., to honor the contributions of African Americans in the United States. In 1928, he wrote to W. E. B. Du Bois about Ferdinand D. Lee's efforts for the National Memorial Association to establish a museum honoring African Americans and their contributions, including as U.S. soldiers.

He commanded the 366th Infantry Regiment during World War II, an all "Colored" (segregated) unit of the United States Army. On March 15, 1941, the Pittsburgh Courier reported that a “Lack of Officers Nearly Cost Race 366th Command.” The article stated "Lack of enough Negro Lieutenant Colonels to serve under him almost cost Col. West A. Hamilton command of the 366th Infantry, the Associated Negro Press learned this week. But pressure exerted on the War Department caused army officials to go through with their original plans of having an all-Negro Army staff." "Colored" men were not allowed to command whites.

In 1983, the National Guard gave him an honorary promotion to brigadier general. The Anacostia Community Museum in Washington, D.C., has a collection of his papers.
