= University of the District of Columbia Community College =

Public college in Washington, D.C. US

Coordinates: 38°56′38.2″N 77°3′55.2″W

University of the District of Columbia Community College (UDC-CC)
- Type: Public, land grant, HBCU
- Established: 1851; 175 years ago
- Parent institution: University of the District of Columbia
- Chairman: Christopher Bell
- Provost: Dr. Lawrence T. Potter
- Dean: Dr. Marilyn Hamilton
- Chief Academic Officer: Dr. Lawrence T. Potter
- Faculty: 37 (100 part time adjuncts)
- Location: Washington, DC, United States
- Campus: Urban
- Website: www.udc.edu/cc

The University of the District of Columbia Community College (UDC-CC) is an open-enrollment, public community college located in Washington, D.C. It operates the associate degree, Certificate, Continuing Education and Workforce Development programs that are offered by the University of the District of Columbia. The primary campus is located in Forest Hills (also known as Van Ness).

== History ==
The Normal School for Colored Girls was established in 1851 and by 1879, the name was changed to "Miner Normal School". Washington Normal School was established in 1873 for girls, and renamed the "Wilson Normal School" in 1913. In 1929, the United States Congress made both schools four-year teachers' colleges and renamed as "Miner Teachers College" for African Americans and "Wilson Teachers College" for whites. In 1955, the two schools merged and were renamed the "District of Columbia Teachers College".

In 1967, Congress awarded the University of the District of Columbia (UDC) land-grant status and a $7.24 million endowment (USD), in lieu of a land grant.

Beginning with the 2009–10 academic year, UDC's programs were split and the UDC Community College (UDC-CC) assumed UDC's associate degree, Certificate, Continuing Education and Workforce Development programs, with UDC's other colleges and schools going forward with the bachelor and graduate degree programs. While UDC-CC maintains an open enrollment policy, UDC has instituted higher admission standards for the bachelor and graduate programs. These changes were in response to UDC's low graduation rate, where only 7.9% of students complete their degrees within 6 years.

In early 2012, University of the District of Columbia Community College tried achieve independent accreditation but discovered that it couldn't get accredited because UDC's, its host university, finances were so unstable.

== Academics ==
UDC-CC offers the following academic programs:

=== Certificate Programs ===
- Nursing Assistant
- Office Technology
- Practical Nursing

=== Associate Degrees ===
- Administrative Office Management
- Architectural Engineering Technology
- Automotive Technology
- Aviation Maintenance Technology
- Business Technology
- Construction Management
- Computer Accounting Technology
- Computer Science Technology
- Corrections Administration
- Education
  - Infant / Toddler Education
  - Early Childhood/School Age (Pre-K – Grade 3)
  - General Education (Elementary and Secondary)
- Fashion Merchandising
- Graphic Communication Technology
- Graphic Design
- Hospitality Management & Tourism
- Law Enforcement
- Legal Assistant
- Liberal Studies
- Mortuary Science
- Music
- Nursing (Program Suspended)
- Respiratory Therapy

The 2009-10 year was a transition period where UDC-CC operated from the UDC campus while a new location for its programs was being developed. UDC-CC now provides classes at ten locations throughout Washington DC.

== Campus ==
The main (Van Ness) campus of UDC is located at Connecticut Avenue and Van Ness St. in Northwest Washington, DC. UDC is primarily a commuter school and opened its first residential accommodations or dormitories in August 2010 by leasing an apartment building across the street from its campus. Some UDC-CC students live in this dorm. The main UDC campus will continue to house UDC-CC's mortuary science program.

UDC-CC has established a number of other locations to conduct its programs beginning with the Fall 2010 semester:

- Bertie Backus: 5171 S. Dakota Ave. NE - main academic and administrative center
- Ronald Reagan National Airport, Hangar #2 - aviation maintenance technology programs Workforce development programs are offered at a number of DC High School campuses.

== See also ==
- Normal School for Colored Girls
- University of the District of Columbia
