= Carrie H. Thomas =

American physician

Carrie H. Thomas was an African-American physician and educator.

== Early life ==
In 1882, Carrie H. Thomas graduated from Miner Normal School, a Washington, D.C. school that focused on training young African American women as teachers. Although a public school by the time Thomas attended, Miner Normal School had previously been associated with Howard University, where Thomas then enrolled for training as a physician. At a time when there were very few black women physicians, Carrie H. Thomas graduated from Howard University College of Medicine in the class of 1890.

== Career ==
Prior to the 1880s, there had been no consistent teaching of physical education in Washington, D.C. public schools for African American children. Combining her medical and education academic training, Thomas played an early role in overseeing the improvement of physical education, with Edwin Bancroft Henderson later revolutionizing the system. In 1892, she was appointed Superintendent of Heredity and Hygiene, assisting in supervising physical education.

On June 30 that year, she wrote a report, signed "C.H. Thomas," detailing visits twice a month to the schools, supervising lesson plans, and observing the physical education classes. Dr. Thomas gave weekly talks to teachers on physical education, hygiene, and other topics covered in the physical education classes. When Thomas resigned the following year, she was succeeded by physical education teacher Mary P. Evans.

In 1896, Thomas was living in Washington D.C., where she represented the Lucy Thurman W.C.T.U. (Women's Christian Temperance Union) during a convention of the National Federation of Colored Women and the National League of Colored Women. Other convention attendees included Margaret Murray Washington (president of the Federation) and Ida B. Wells.

From at least 1905 through 1915, she was serving in the Woman's Relief Corps (WRC). In 1911, Thomas also was serving as treasurer for the O.P. Morton Woman's Relief Corps, No. 1. Thomas represented the Potomac at the National Convention for the WRC in 1915, where she was the convention's official physician.

== Death ==
Thomas died in 1930 at the Freedman's Hospital, later Howard University Hospital. The hospital now is the site of the Howard University College of Nursing and College of Allied Health Sciences.
