= Emily Howland =

American philanthropist (1827–1929)

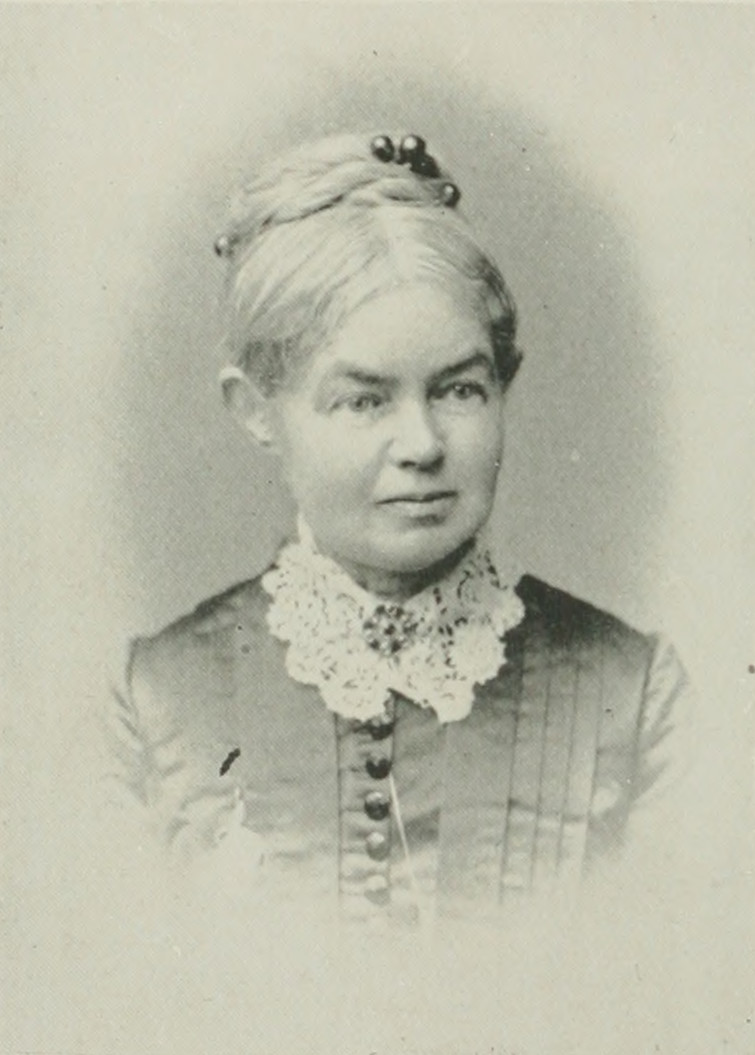
- Portrait of Emily Howland from A Woman of the Century
- Born: November 20, 1827; Sherwood, New York
- Died: June 29, 1929 (aged 101)
- Occupations: philanthropist, humanitarian, abolitionist, educator
- Parents: Slocum Howland (father); Hannah Tallcot (mother)

Emily Howland (November 20, 1827 – June 29, 1929) was a philanthropist, humanitarian, and educator. She supported the education of African-Americans. She was also a strong supporter of women's rights and the temperance movement. Howland personally financed the education of many black students and contributed to institutions such as the Tuskegee Institute, Henry Damon Davidson's Centerville Industrial Institute, and Kowaliga Institute in Kowaliga, Alabama, where Howland Hall was named for her.

== Early life and education ==
Emily Howland was born at Sherwood in Cayuga County, New York, on November 20, 1827. She was the daughter of Slocum and Hannah Tallcot Howland, who were prominent in the Society of Friends. Her brother, William Howland, served in the 106th New York State Legislature. She was educated in small private schools in the community, and the Margaret Robinson School, a Friends school in Philadelphia, Pennsylvania.

== Career ==
An active abolitionist, Howland taught at Normal School for Colored Girls (later known as the Miner School and now University of the District of Columbia) in Washington, D.C., from 1857 to 1859. During the Civil War, she worked at the contraband refugee settlement of Camp Todd in Arlington, Virginia, establishing a school where she taught freed slaves to read and write as well as administering to the sick during a smallpox outbreak, coordinating relief efforts, and ultimately serving as director of the camp from 1864 to 1866.

Beginning in 1867, she started a community for freed people in Heathsville, Northumberland County, Virginia, called Arcadia, on 400 acres purchased by her father, including a school for the education of children of freed slaves, the Howland Chapel School. She continued to maintain an active interest in African-American education, donating money and materials as well as visiting and corresponding with administrators at many schools. Returning to Sherwood, New York, after her father's death in 1881, she inherited $50,000 ($1.67 million in 2025 dollars) and ran the Sherwood Select School until 1926 when it became a public school and was renamed the Emily Howland Elementary School by the state of New York.

Howland was also active in women's suffrage, peace, and temperance movements and was a member of the Woman's Christian Temperance Union. In 1858, she began organizing women's rights lectures and meetings with Susan B. Anthony and Elizabeth Cady Stanton. In 1878, she spoke at the 30th anniversary of the Seneca Falls woman's rights convention and in 1894 the New York State legislature. When the suffrage movement split into two groups, the National Woman Suffrage Association and the American Woman Suffrage Association, Howland did not take sides, but attended meetings of both groups. In 1904, she spoke in front of Congress and attended the 1912 and 1913 suffrage parades in New York. She has been credited with persuading Ezra Cornell that, as a Quaker, he should make Cornell University a coeducational institution.

In 1926 she received an honorary Litt.D. degree from the University of the State of NY, in Albany, the first woman to have this honor conferred upon her from this institution. She was also the author of an historical sketch of early Quaker history in Cayuga County, NY: Historical Sketch of Friends in Cayuga County.

Howland became one of the first female directors of a national bank in the United States, at the First National Bank of Aurora in Aurora, New York, in 1890, serving until her death, at age 101.

== Legacy ==
Her papers are held by several universities, including Cornell University, Haverford College, and Swarthmore College. A photo album containing family, friends, and colleagues, as well as souvenir images of notable abolitionists and famous figures during the 1860s and 1870s is jointly owned by the National Museum of African American History and Culture and the Library of Congress. In 2021, she was inducted into the National Women's Hall of Fame.
