= Women on US stamps =

History and representation of women on United States postage stamps

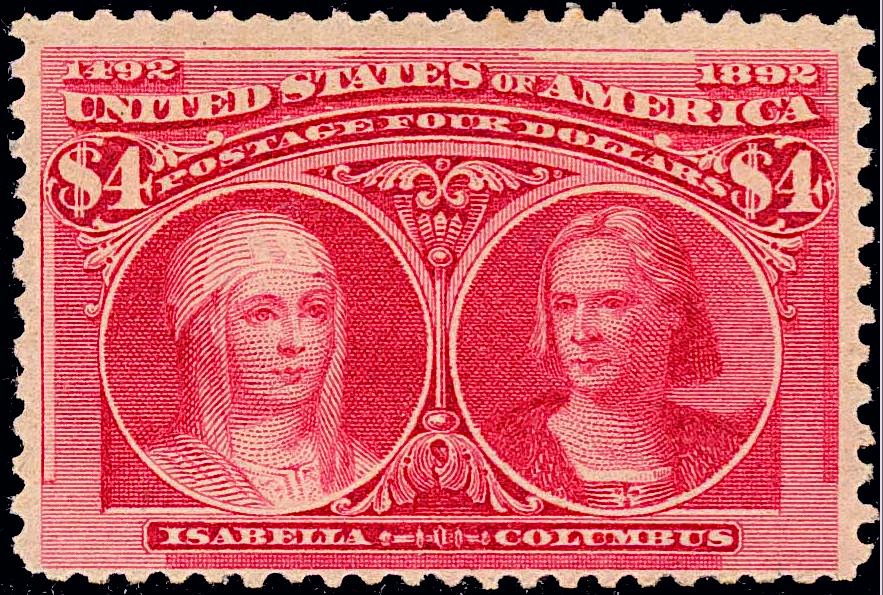
The 1893 four-dollar Columbian stamp depicting Isabella I of Castile and Christopher Columbus. Isabella was the first identifiable woman depicted on a United States postage stamp.

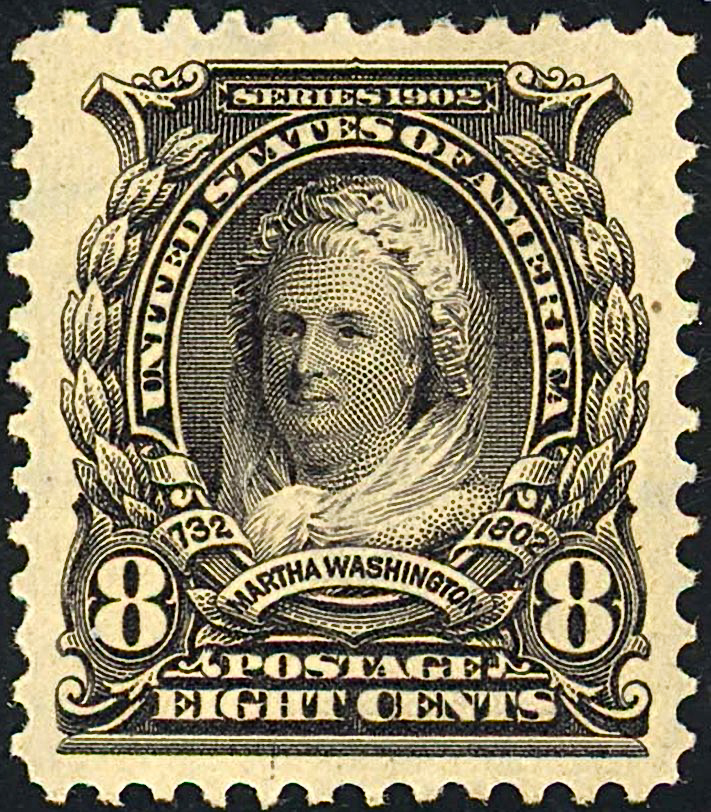
The 1902 eight-cent Martha Washington stamp, the first United States stamp issued specifically to honor an American woman.

The history of women on United States postage stamps began in 1893, when Queen Isabella I of Castile became the first identifiable woman depicted on a United States postage stamp. She appeared in several designs in the Columbian Issue, which commemorated the 400th anniversary of Christopher Columbus's first voyage to the Americas. In 1902, Martha Washington became the first American woman specifically honored on a United States stamp. Pocahontas appeared on a 1907 stamp issued for the Jamestown Exposition, becoming the first Native American woman—and the first identifiable Native American person—depicted on a United States stamp.

Women represented on United States stamps include political figures, writers, artists, scientists, athletes, activists, entertainers, military personnel, and religious leaders. The United States Postal Service (USPS) also classifies stamps depicting anonymous women, groups of women, women's organizations, works created by women, and subjects associated with women's history as women-related stamp subjects. Consequently, the subject is broader than a list of portrait stamps.

The selection of stamp subjects has reflected changing ideas about national memory and public achievement. A study of twentieth-century United States stamps found that men appeared substantially more often than women and that women were more likely to be portrayed in traditional roles, although women's representation increased during the century.

== Scope ==
The USPS chronology of women-related stamp subjects includes several overlapping categories:

- named or identifiable women depicted on stamps;
- anonymous women and groups of women;
- women's organizations, occupations, achievements, and social movements;
- works of art, literature, photography, or design created by women; and
- allegorical female figures, including personifications of Liberty.

This broad classification means that not every issue categorized by the USPS as a women-related subject is a biographical commemoration. For example, stamps have depicted women in the military, women cryptologists of World War II, women's suffrage, breast-cancer awareness, women's soccer, paintings by Mary Cassatt, and Dorothea Lange's photograph Migrant Mother.

== History ==
=== Early issues, 1893–1940 ===
Queen Isabella appeared in seven designs in the 1893 Columbian Issue. The best-known is the four-dollar stamp showing Isabella and Columbus, but other stamps in the series also depicted her in narrative scenes. Unlike later commemorative stamps devoted to a single person, the Columbian Issue used Isabella as part of a historical account of Columbus's expedition.

The first stamp issued specifically to honor an American woman was the eight-cent Martha Washington definitive stamp of 1902. Washington appeared again on definitive stamps in 1923 and 1938. The 1907 Jamestown Exposition Issue included Pocahontas, and a 1928 stamp honored the Revolutionary War figure popularly known as Molly Pitcher.

During the 1930s and early 1940s, the range of women represented expanded. Subjects included Anna McNeill Whistler, whose image was adapted from James McNeill Whistler's painting Whistler's Mother; suffragist Susan B. Anthony; Virginia Dare; author Louisa May Alcott; reformer Frances Willard; and social worker Jane Addams.

=== Postwar expansion ===
After World War II, stamps increasingly represented women's organizations, collective service, reform movements, and professional achievements. A 1948 issue honored Gold Star Mothers, while another stamp commemorated women who had served in the United States armed forces. The same period brought stamps honoring Clara Barton, Juliette Gordon Low, Moina Michael, and the women's-rights leaders Elizabeth Cady Stanton, Lucretia Mott, and Carrie Chapman Catt.

The 1950s and 1960s included stamps honoring Betsy Ross, Sacagawea, Amelia Earhart, Eleanor Roosevelt, Mary Cassatt, and abolitionist and women's-rights advocate Lucy Stone. These issues broadened the types of achievement recognized on stamps, although women remained less frequently represented than men.

The 1970s and 1980s saw a substantial increase in stamps honoring women in literature, medicine, science, civil rights, public administration, and the arts. Notable examples included Emily Dickinson, Willa Cather, Elizabeth Blackwell, Harriet Tubman, Helen Keller, Anne Sullivan, Frances Perkins, Rachel Carson, Pearl S. Buck, Lillian Moller Gilbreth, Mary McLeod Bethune, and Sojourner Truth. Tubman's 1978 stamp was the first in the USPS Black Heritage series and made her the first African American woman individually honored on a United States postage stamp.

=== Since the 1990s ===
From the 1990s onward, the stamp program featured a wider range of women from popular culture, journalism, aviation, science, sports, law, politics, and the performing arts. Subjects included Patsy Cline, Grace Kelly, Billie Holiday, Bessie Coleman, Georgia O'Keeffe, Madam C. J. Walker, Lucille Ball, Frida Kahlo, Zora Neale Hurston, Marian Anderson, Ella Fitzgerald, Gerty Cori, Julia de Burgos, Barbara Jordan, Rosa Parks, Shirley Chisholm, Maya Angelou, Sally Ride, Gwen Ifill, Chien-Shiung Wu, and Edmonia Lewis.

In 2001, Mexican painter Frida Kahlo became the first Hispanic woman depicted on a United States postage stamp. In addition to individual portraits, USPS issues increasingly recognized collective and thematic subjects, including women in journalism, women in the military, women's suffrage, women cryptologists of World War II, and women's soccer.

Recent individual subjects have included Ruth Bader Ginsburg and Toni Morrison in 2023; Constance Baker Motley, Betty Ford, and several women associated with the Underground Railroad in 2024; Betty White and Barbara Bush in 2025; and Phillis Wheatley in 2026.

A 2026 pane also reproduced four details from the 1898 Pictorial Quilt by African American textile artist Harriet Powers, illustrating how women may be represented through their creative work rather than through portraits.

== Types of representation ==
=== Portraits and identifiable historical figures ===
Many stamps present a portrait or an identifiable image of an individual woman. These include first ladies, political leaders, activists, writers, artists, scientists, athletes, and entertainers. Some women have appeared more than once, either in separate commemorative issues or as part of definitive series. Examples include Martha Washington, Eleanor Roosevelt, Mary Cassatt, Harriet Tubman, and Lucille Ball.

=== Collective and anonymous subjects ===
Other stamps depict women collectively or anonymously. Examples include Gold Star Mothers, women in the armed services, nurses, women cryptologists, and athletes participating in women's sports. These issues commemorate a group, occupation, or social role rather than a named individual.

=== Women's history and social movements ===
United States stamps have marked events and movements associated with women's history, including the campaign for women's suffrage and the ratification of the Nineteenth Amendment to the United States Constitution. Stamps have also addressed women's health and public awareness, including breast-cancer research and awareness issues.

=== Creative works by women ===
The USPS includes stamps reproducing works by women artists, photographers, illustrators, and designers in its chronology of women-related subjects. Examples include paintings by Mary Cassatt and Georgia O'Keeffe, photographs by Dorothea Lange and Imogen Cunningham, and quilt designs by Harriet Powers. In these cases, the woman may not be depicted on the stamp, but her work forms the stamp's central subject.

=== Allegorical figures ===
Female personifications have appeared on United States stamps since the nineteenth century. The most common is Liberty, represented in many artistic forms. These allegorical figures are distinct from stamps honoring historical women because they symbolize political ideals rather than identifiable people.

== Selection and production ==
Since 1957, the Citizens' Stamp Advisory Committee (CSAC) has reviewed proposals for stamp subjects and made recommendations to the postmaster general. Committee members are appointed by the postmaster general and are selected for expertise in fields such as history, design, education, and public affairs.

The committee generally considers stamp subjects several years before their proposed issue date. Under current USPS rules, living people are not eligible to appear on United States postage stamps, and a person ordinarily becomes eligible three years after death. Former presidents may be honored on the first birthday after their death.

Since 2011, commemorative stamps issued at the one-ounce First-Class Mail rate have generally been issued as Forever stamps. As a result, recent stamps do not display a numerical denomination.

== Representation and interpretation ==
Postage stamps are official objects of public commemoration and therefore reflect institutional choices about which people, events, and achievements are presented as nationally significant. Scholars have examined stamps as a form of national iconography and collective memory.

Ogletree, Merritt, and Roberts examined portrayals of women and men on twentieth-century United States stamps. They found that men were represented substantially more often and that female figures were more frequently associated with traditional or domestic roles. The authors also found increased representation of women by 1990–1991, although not parity. Because their dataset covered the twentieth century through the early 1990s, their numerical findings do not describe the current stamp program.

The expansion of women-related subjects has included both a greater number of individually named women and a broader range of occupations and identities. Nevertheless, decisions about inclusion, categorization, and historical significance remain selective, and the official USPS chronology combines portrait subjects with collective, thematic, and artistic issues.

== Selected milestones ==
The following table summarizes selected firsts and other milestones discussed in reliable sources. The separate list article preserves the fuller chronological record of named women, groups, artworks, organizations, and thematic women-related subjects.

Year	Subject	Significance
1893	Isabella I of Castile	First identifiable woman depicted on a United States postage stamp; appeared in seven designs in the Columbian Issue.
1902	Martha Washington	First American woman specifically honored on a United States postage stamp.
1907	Pocahontas	First Native American woman and first identifiable Native American person depicted on a United States postage stamp.
1936	Susan B. Anthony	Early stamp honoring a leader of the women's-suffrage movement.
1948	Elizabeth Cady Stanton, Lucretia Mott, and Carrie Chapman Catt	Joint issue honoring three leaders of the women's-rights movement.
1952	Women in the Armed Services	Collective commemoration of women serving in the United States military.
1963	Amelia Earhart	Honored aviation achievement and the first woman to fly solo nonstop across the Atlantic Ocean.
1978	Harriet Tubman	First African American woman individually honored on a United States stamp and first subject in the Black Heritage series.
1980	Frances Perkins	Honored the first woman to serve in the United States Cabinet.
1985	Mary McLeod Bethune	Honored an educator, civil-rights leader, and institution builder.
1995	Bessie Coleman	Honored the first African American woman and first self-identified Native American woman to hold a pilot license.
2001	Frida Kahlo	First Hispanic woman depicted on a United States postage stamp.
2009	Civil Rights Pioneers	Included several women active in the civil-rights movement, including Ella Baker, Fannie Lou Hamer, Daisy Bates, Ruby Hurley, Mary White Ovington, and Mary Church Terrell.
2013	Rosa Parks	Issued on the centenary of Parks's birth.
2014	Shirley Chisholm	Honored the first African American woman elected to the United States Congress.
2018	Sally Ride	Honored the first American woman in space.
2021	Chien-Shiung Wu	Honored an experimental physicist known for major contributions to nuclear and particle physics.
2022	Women Cryptologists of World War II	Collective issue honoring approximately 11,000 women who helped process and decipher military communications.
2023	Ruth Bader Ginsburg	Honored the second woman to serve as a justice of the Supreme Court of the United States.
2024	Constance Baker Motley	Black Heritage issue honoring the first African American woman to argue a case before the Supreme Court and the first to serve as a federal judge.
2025	Betty White	Commemorative Forever stamp honoring the actress and comedian.
2026	Phillis Wheatley	Forty-ninth issue in the Black Heritage series, honoring the early African American poet.

== See also ==
- Artworks on stamps of the United States
- Black Heritage series
- List of people on the postage stamps of the United States
- Postage stamps and postal history of the United States
- Topical stamp collecting
- Women in the United States
