= Myrtilla Miner =

American educator and abolitionist (1815–1864)

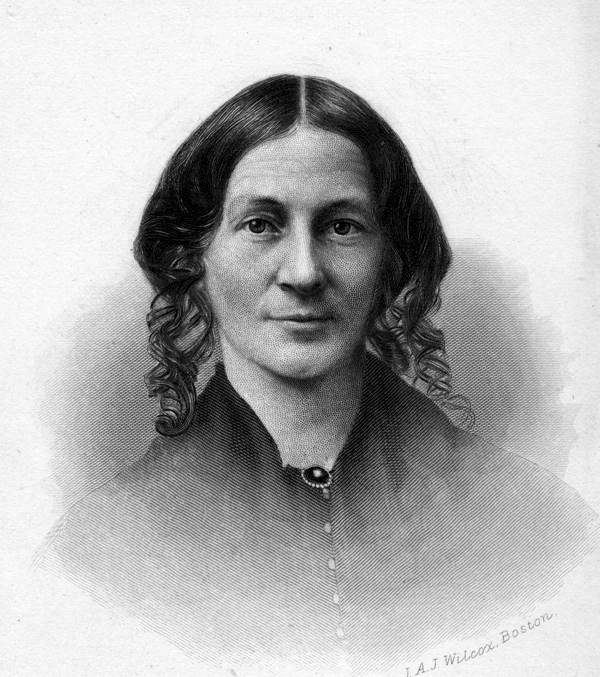
Myrtilla Miner, by J. A. J. Wilcox

Myrtilla Miner (March 4, 1815, near Brookfield, New York – December 17, 1864, Washington, D.C.) was an American educator and abolitionist whose school for African-American girls, established against considerable racist opposition, grew into the University of the District of Columbia, the only public university in Washington, D.C.

== Biography ==
Miner was educated at the Young Ladies' Domestic Seminary in Clinton, New York, and at the Clover Street Seminary in Rochester, New York She taught at various schools, including the Newton Female Institute in 1846–1847 at Whitesville, Mississippi, where she was denied permission to conduct classes for African-American girls.

In 1851 Miner opened the Normal School for Colored Girls in Washington, D.C. This was done at a time when slavery was still legal in the U.S. Within two months the enrollment grew from 6 to 40, and, despite hostility from a portion of the community, the school prospered. Contributions from Quakers continued to arrive, and Harriet Beecher Stowe gave $1,000 of her Uncle Tom's Cabin royalties. The school was forced to move three times in its first two years, but in 1854 it settled on a 3-acre (1.2-hectare) lot with house and barn on the edge of the city.

In 1856 the school came under the care of a board of trustees, among whom were Henry Ward Beecher and Johns Hopkins. Although the school offered primary schooling and classes in domestic skills, its emphasis from the outset was on training Black women to become teachers.

Miner's School was closed during the Civil War. The school was eventually reopened after her death and merged with other local institutions to become the University of the District of Columbia.

Miner guided the school through its fruitful early years but had to lessen her connection because of failing health. In 1857, Emily Howland took over leadership of the school and in 1861 Miner went to California in an attempt to regain her health. A carriage accident in 1864 ended that hope and Miner died shortly after her return to Washington, D.C. She is buried in Oak Hill Cemetery in Georgetown, Washington, D.C.

== Legacy ==
Miner Elementary School in Washington, D.C., is named in her honor.

Miner was a 2013 Inductee into the National Abolition Hall of Fame in Peterboro, New York.
