= Centerville Industrial Institute =

School in Centerville, Alabama, US (1900–1969)

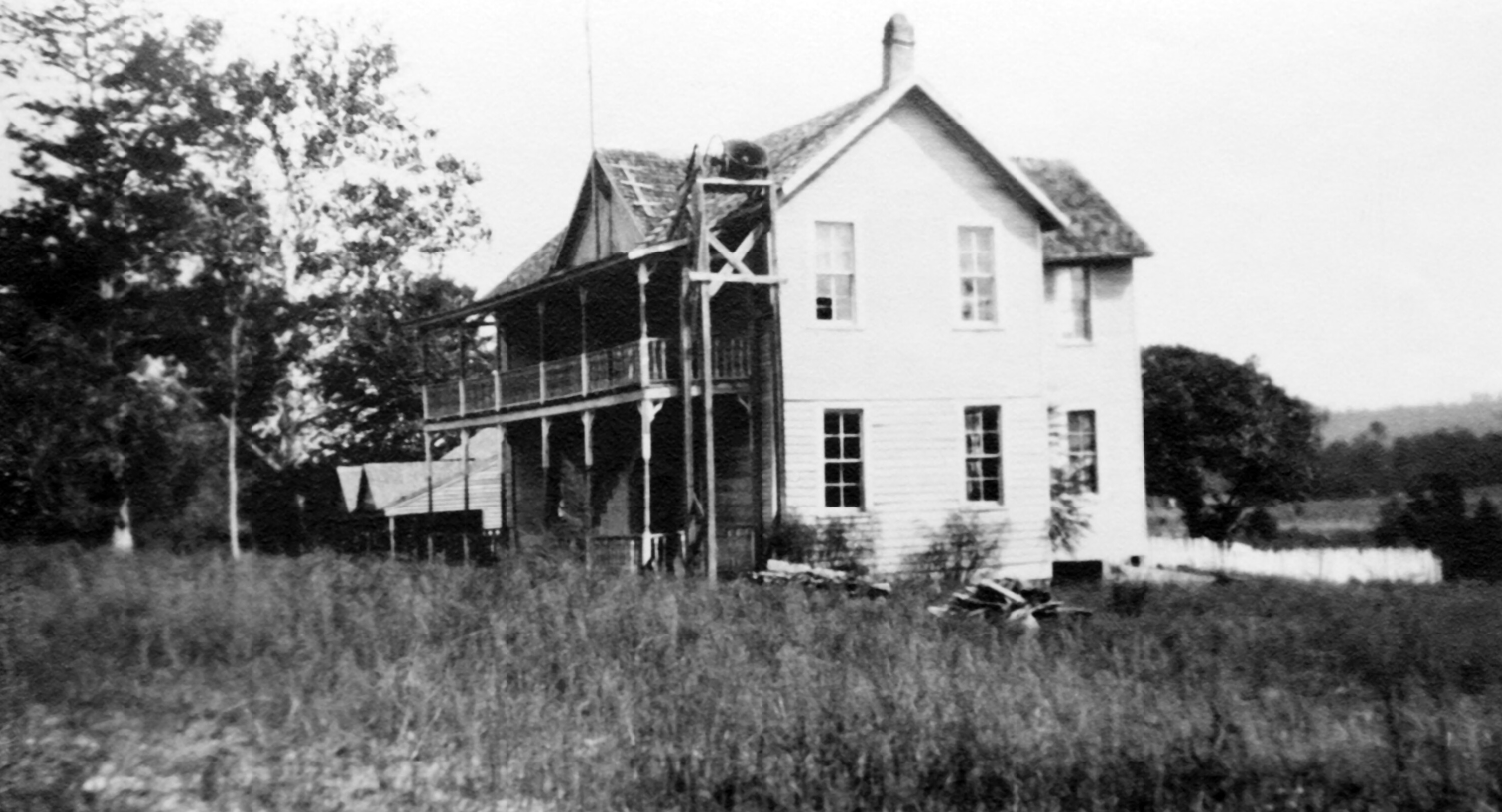
- Centerville Industrial Institute, c. 1915

Location
- 1621 Montgomery Hwy, Centreville, Alabama, U.S.
- 32.9424°N 87.1156°W

Information
- Other names: Centreville Institute, Davidson High School
- Former name: Bibb County Training School (1918–1966); H. D. Davidson High School (1966–1969),
- Established: October 1900
- Closed: 1969

Alabama Register of Landmarks and Heritage
- Designated: November 6, 1975

Centerville Industrial School (1900–1969), also spelled as Centreville Industrial School, was a school for African American students in Centreville, Alabama, the county seat of Bibb County. It was the only school of higher learning and advanced training for Black students in or adjacent to Bibb County at the time. The school was also a Rosenwald School. It was later known as the Bibb County Training School and finally as H. D. Davidson High School for educator Henry Damon Davidson. It now operates as the Henry Damon Davidson Library and Museum.

It has been listed on the Alabama Register of Landmarks and Heritage since November 6, 1975.

== History ==
The school was founded in 1900 and opened in October of the same year. Henry Damon Davidson and his spouse Lula Julia Davis Davidson were the school's founders. Henry served as teacher and founding principal, and Lula also worked at the school until her death in 1903.

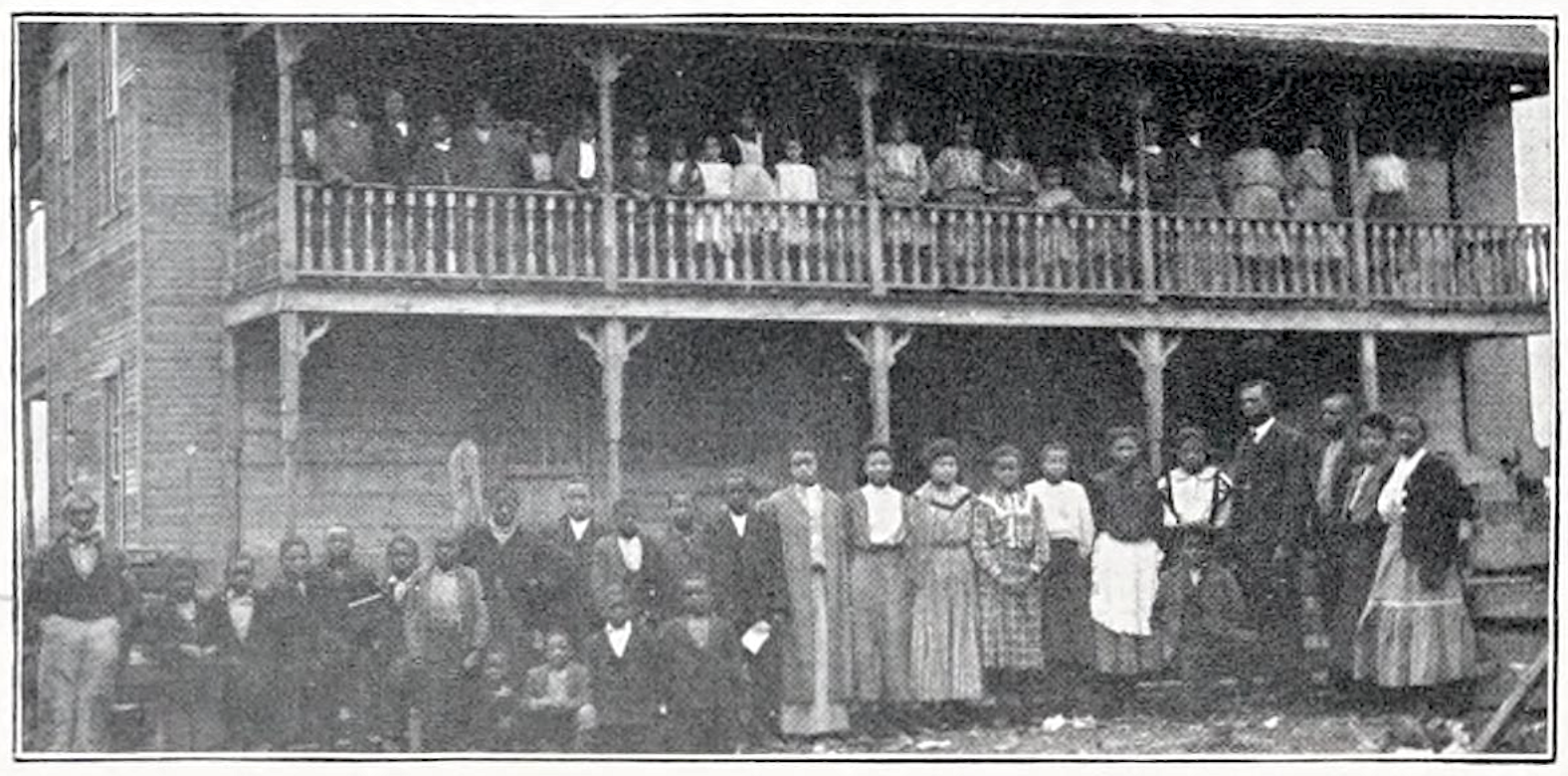
Emily Howland Hall (c. 1910) at Centerville Industrial Institute; named after philanthropist Emily Howland

As of 1908, there were 152 students, 82 male and 70 female with five teachers, three male and two female. In 1910, the property on which the school operated was valued at US $5,500 and the school's annual operating costs of $1,500 were covered by concerts, subscriptions, and Davidson's efforts to keep costs low.

Much of the school's programming was held within Emily Howland Hall, a two-story five-frame building that dated to 1889. In 1918, the school became the Bibb County Training School. Howland Hall burned in a fire in 1960, and little of the building remains.

A new school was completed in 1966 and named in honor of Henry Damon Davidson, being known as H. D. Davidson High School, but it graduated its last class in 1969.

== Closure and legacy ==
The campus re-opened in 1970–1971 as the Centreville Elementary School, and by 2008 it was known as the Centreville Middle School. The current school includes on the campus the Henry Damon Davidson Library and Museum, which opened in 2017.

The University of Virginia has a photograph of the school in the Jackson Davis Collection of African American Photographs.
