= James Ormond Wilson Normal School =

- U.S. National Register of Historic Places
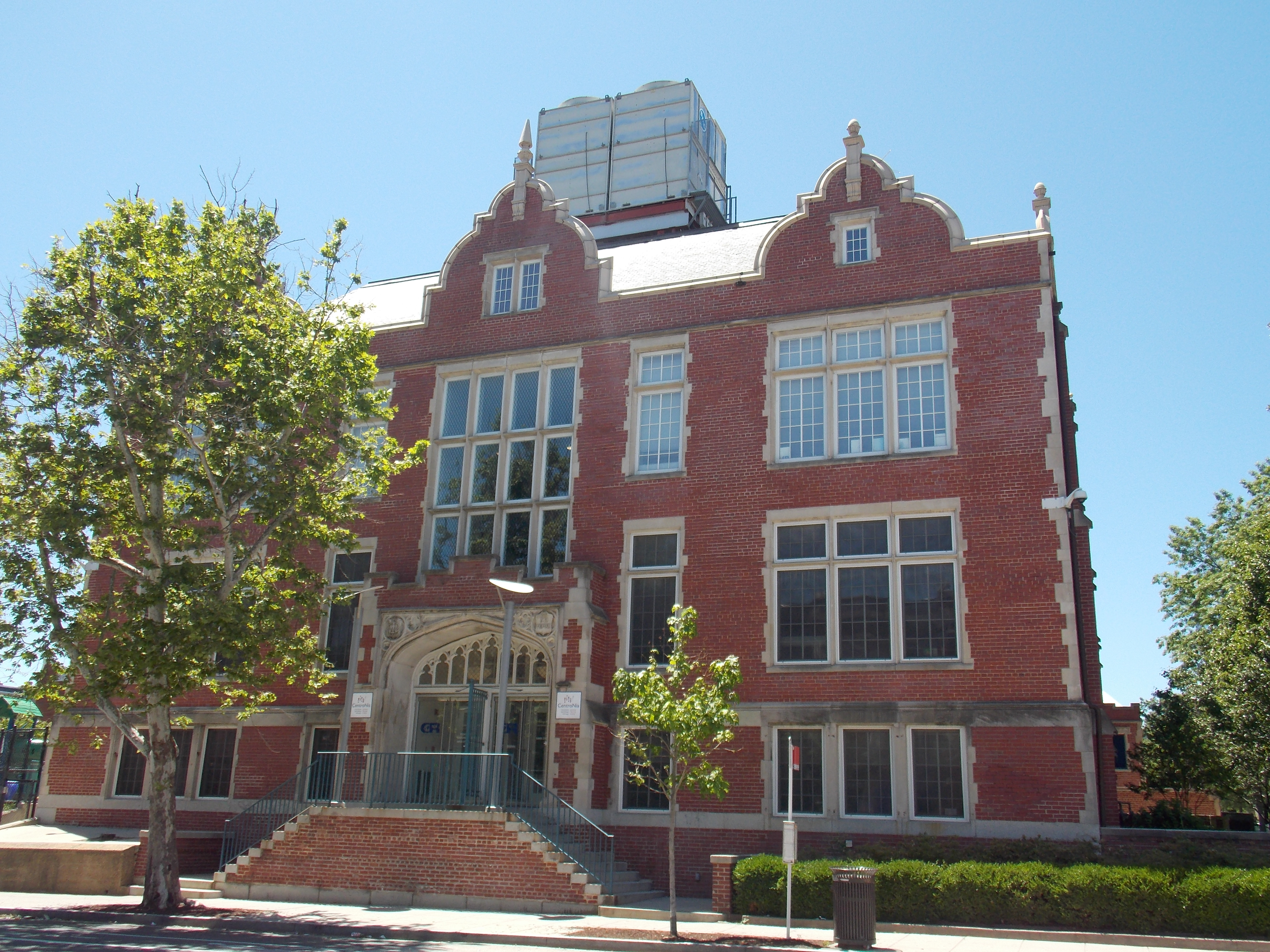

- Location within Washington, D.C.
- Location: 1100 Harvard St., NW; Washington, D.C.
- Coordinates: 38°55′36″N 77°01′38″W
- Built: 1911-12
- Architect: Snowden Ashford
- Architectural style: Jacobethan
- MPS: Public School Buildings of Washington, DC MPS
- NRHP reference No.: 15000115
- Added to NRHP: March 31, 2015

The James Ormond Wilson Normal School was a historic normal school in Washington, D.C. Founded in 1873 as the all-white Washington Normal School, it was renamed in 1913 after the city's first superintendent of schools. It provided teacher training until 1955, when it was merged with the all-black Miner Normal School to become the District of Columbia Teachers College.

Its main building, located at 1100 Harvard Street NW, was designed by city architect Snowden Ashford and was completed in 1912. It is a distinctive Jacobethan structure, built out of red brick with limestone trim elements. The building now forms one of the campuses of the Carlos Rosario International Public Charter School.

The building was listed on the National Register of Historic Places in 2015.

== See also ==
- National Register of Historic Places listings in the upper NW Quadrant of Washington, D.C.
