= Julia West Hamilton =

American community leader

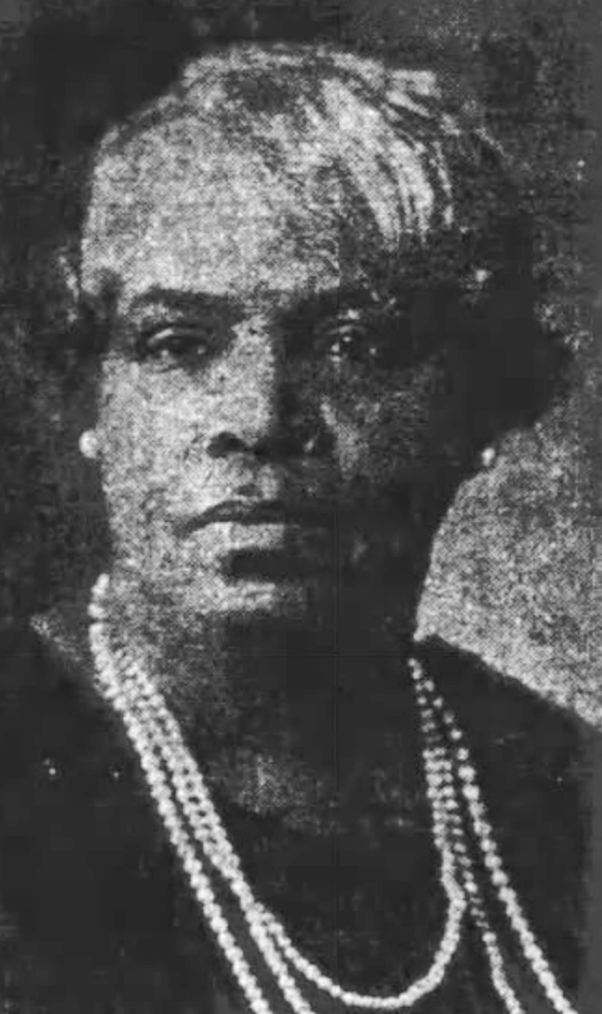
- Hamilton, from a 1930 newspaper
- Born: 1866; Charleston, South Carolina, U.S.
- Died: February 22, 1958 (age 91); Washington, D.C., U.S.
- Occupations: Clubwoman, community leader
- Children: 5, including West A. Hamilton

Julia West Hamilton (1866 – February 22, 1958) was an American clubwoman and community leader based in Washington, D.C., and known as "Mother of the District". She was the first and longtime president of the Washington and Vicinity Federation of Women's Clubs, from 1924 to 1945, and president of the city's Phyllis Wheatley YWCA for 28 years. She was treasurer of the National Association of Colored Women's Clubs (NACW).

== Early life ==
West was born in Charleston, South Carolina, the daughter of Thomas W. West and Martha A. West. Both of her parents were recently emancipated from slavery; her father served in the United States Navy during the American Civil War.

== Career and clubwork ==
Hamilton was a dressmaker as a young woman. She worked at the United States Department of the Treasury for 31 years, until she retired in 1933. At the Bureau of Engraving and Printing, she was president of the Federal Employee Union unit, with about 300 members, in 1919.

She was the first and longtime president of the Washington and Vicinity Federation of Women's Clubs, from 1924 to 1945; the charter members with Hamilton included Nannie Helen Burroughs and Mary McLeod Bethune. She was also treasurer of the National Association of Colored Women's Clubs (NACW). In 1928 when the NACW met in Washington, Hamilton welcomed the assembly with remarks and hosted a reception for Bethune, as the local club president. In 1945 she was succeeded by Isadora Letcher as president.

In 1928 Hamilton testified before a Congressional hearing on a Washington memorial to the contributions of Negro soldiers. Her remarks began, "We are here, not as parasites or supplicants asking for what is not ours by right, but we are here as loyal American citizens, having discharged the duties and responsibilities of citizenship, asking that a long-delayed tribute of gratitude be paid to a group of people who have proved themselves to be 100 per cent American and loyal to our flag in every crisis of our Nation's history."

Hamilton was president of the city's Phyllis Wheatley YWCA for 28 years, beginning in 1930. In 1938, Mary Church Terrell organized the Julia West Hamilton League, a Black women's philanthropic club; the league met at the Wheatley YWCA.

Hamilton was the first woman to chair the board of trustees at Metropolitan AME Church. During the 1930s she chaired the local advisory committee of the National Youth Administration. She was also active in the Women's Relief Corps, the National Council of Negro Women, the International Interracial Committee, the National Ministers' Wives Association, the Washington Community Chest, the Public School Association of the District of Columbia, the Order of the Eastern Star, and many other organizations. She lectured nationwide, supporting Black women's clubs and YWCAs.

== Personal life ==
West married social worker John Alexander Hamilton in 1886. They had four children, including West A. Hamilton. Her husband died in 1925, and she died in 1958, at Freedmen's Hospital, at the age of 91. Mordecai Wyatt Johnson, president of Howard University, spoke before over a thousand mourners at her memorial service, saying "There was something great and supreme in the life of this woman. No matter how difficult the task, she was optimistic". In 1969, Julia West Hamilton Junior High School in Washington, D.C., was named in her memory. Hamilton is a character in the 2021 play The DePriest Incident by Charles White.
