= Henry Damon Davidson =

American educator (1869–1955)

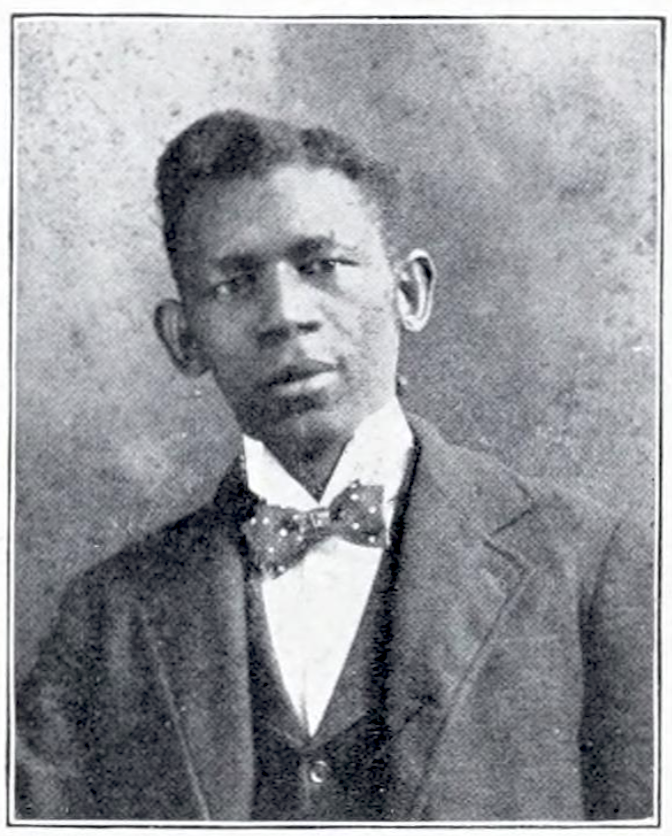
- Born: December 16, 1869; Bibb County, Alabama, U.S.
- Died: February 21, 1955 (aged 85); Selma, Alabama, U.S.
- Other names: H. D. Davidson, Henry Damon
- Education: Selma University, Payne Institute, Tuskeegee Institute (BA), Hampton Institute, Columbia University, Fisk University
- Occupation(s): Academic administrator, educator, church leader, author
- Spouse(s): Lula Julia Davis (m. 1899–1908; her death); Elizabeth M. Campbell McClellan (m. 1913–)

Henry Damon Davidson (December 16, 1869 – February 21, 1955), sometimes noted as Henry Damon, or H. D. Davidson, was an American academic administrator, educator, author, and church leader in Centreville, Alabama. He founded the Bibb County Training School, known first as Centerville Industrial Institute in 1900. He was sometimes referred to as Bibb County's "black educator".

== Life and career ==
Henry Damon Davidson was born on December 16, 1869, at the Davidson Plantation (or Davidson–Smitherman House) in Bibb County, Alabama. His parents were Adaline (née Woods) and Damon Davidson. The family had been enslaved by Samuel Wilson Davidson, and the former plantation is now listed on the National Register of Historic Places. When he was 5 years old, his family moved to Centreville, Alabama and lived on a farm. He was enrolled in public school in Centreville, and attended school whenever he had breaks from farming.

Davidson studied one term at Selma University and returned to his school in Centreville as a teacher. He then studied at the newly opened Payne Institute, graduating in its first class May 18, 1893. He attained a bachelor's degree in 1934 from the Tuskeegee Institute (now Tuskegee University). He did additional studies at Hampton Institute, Columbia University and Fisk University.

Davidson married Lula Julia Davis, a graduate of Tuskegee Institute, on February 16, 1899. She died June 21, 1908. He re-married to Elizabeth M. Campbell McClellan on September 4, 1913.

Davidson and his wife Lula founded in 1900 the Centerville Industrial Institute in Centerville, Alabama, later known as the Bibb County Training School.

Davidson was active in Mt. Sinai African Methodist Episcopal church, and was presented with an honored in 1945 by the Mt. Sinai AME Church. He was the author of, Inching Along; or, the Life and Works of an Alabama Farm Boy, An Autobiography (1944). He was a delegate to the 1900 Republican National Convention in Philadelphia.

== Death and legacy ==
Davidson died from a short illness on February 21, 1955, in the hospital in Selma, Alabama.

Following a fire in the former school building, a new school was completed in 1966 and named in honor of Davidson, however it closed shortly after in 1969. By 2008, it was known as Centreville Middle School. It includes the Henry Damon Davidson Library and Museum, which opened in 2017. An alumni association is also named for him.

A letter he wrote to donor Emily Howland, for whom the school's Howland Hall was named, survives.
