= Davidson–Smitherman House =

Historic house in Alabama, United States

- U.S. National Register of Historic Places
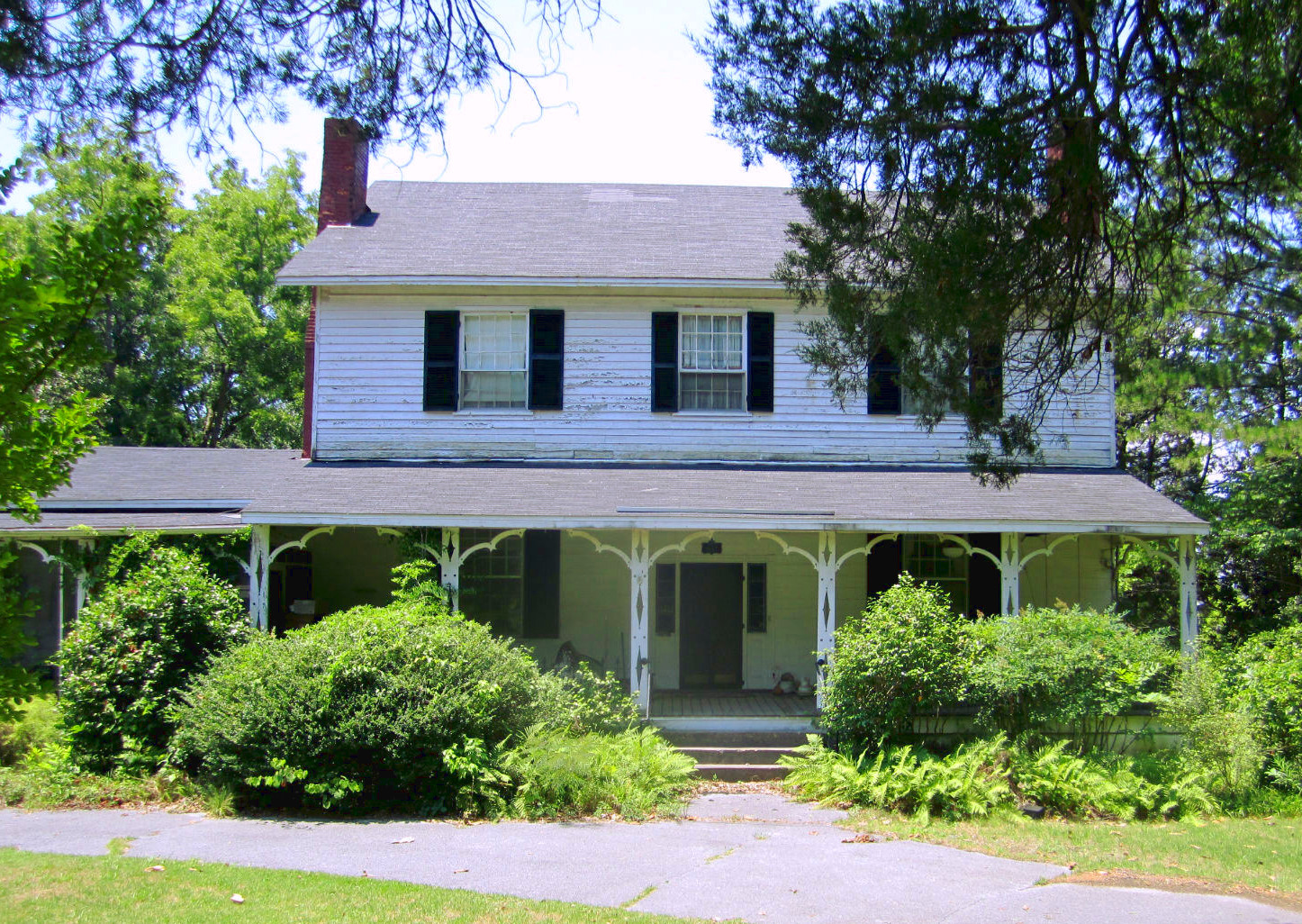
- The rear of the house, as seen from the driveway approach.

- Location within Alabama Location within the United States
- Location: 167 Third Ave., Centreville, Alabama
- Coordinates: 32°56′34″N 87°8′1″W
- Area: 4.9 acres (2.0 ha)
- Built: 1837
- Built by: George W. Howard, C. Enoch Carson
- NRHP reference No.: 87001552
- Added to NRHP: January 6, 1988

The Davidson–Smitherman House, also known as the Davidson Plantation, is a historic plantation house in Centreville in Bibb County, Alabama, United States. It was added to the National Register of Historic Places on January 6, 1988.

== History ==
The house was built in 1837 for Samuel Wilson Davidson, a native of North Carolina. He settled in Bibb County (then Cahaba County) in 1819. He was one of the first people to purchase lots along the east bank of the Cahaba River in what would become the city of Centreville during 1823. Davidson eventually amassed farmlands amounting to more than 2,000 acres (810 ha). His real estate was valued at $12,000 (~$350,177 in 2024) and he owned 98 slaves in 1850. By 1860, Davidson was the most extensive planter and wealthiest citizen in the area. He died in 1863.

Henry Damon Davidson was born on the property in 1869, his family had been enslaved.

The house remained in the Davidson family until 1869, when it was purchased by Thomas and Betty Smitherman. Thomas Smitherman was a prominent local attorney. Smitherman descendants retained the property until it was sold to William E. Henderson in 1963. He, in turn, sold it after two years to Charles L. Hollinsworth, who sold it to Gladys Pittman Leggett in 1972.

== Architecture ==
The 2 1/2-story Federal style house is notable as one of the only two best antebellum houses remaining in the county and as one of the two earliest and least altered houses built in Centreville by the city's leading builders, George Howard and Enoch Carson. The wood-frame structure is set over a full brick basement. The front and rear both feature three bay facades, inset with 12 over 12 sash windows downstairs and 12 over 8 windows upstairs. The front facade features a full-width two-tiered porch with decorative brackets, while the rear features a one-story porch with brackets matching those on the front. The interior is arranged on a center hall plan, with a reverse flight stairway. The house has Federal style mantles and wainscoting, with heart pine floors throughout.
