= Felix Grant =

American radio personality

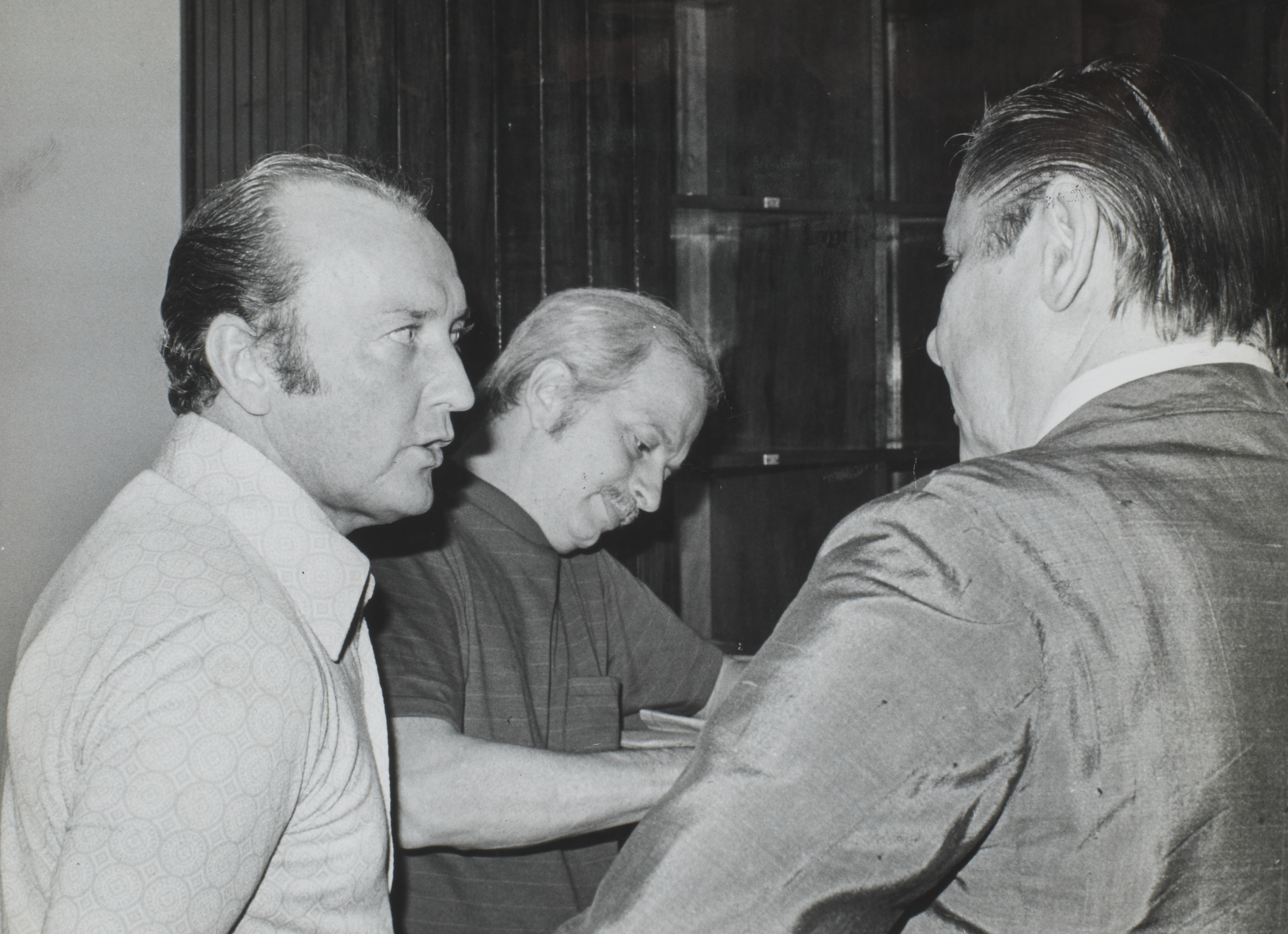
- Felix Grant and Luiz Bonfá, 1972

Background information
- Birth name: Felix E. Grant
- Born: December 22, 1918; New York City, New York, U.S.
- Died: October 12, 1993 (aged 74); Washington, D.C., U.S.
- Genres: Jazz, Bossa Nova
- Occupation: Radio presenter
- Years active: 1945–1993

Felix Grant (December 22, 1918 – October 12, 1993) was a radio presenter who specialized in playing jazz music during his long career in Washington, D.C. (1945 to 1993), primarily at radio station WMAL.

Recognized for his distinctive voice, sophisticated style, and personal connection to many of the twentieth century's jazz greats, he was known for his many on-air interviews of prominent jazz musicians. Felix Grant is credited as the person who introduced Brazilian music—and especially Bossa Nova—to the United States in the 1960s.

Grant was responsible for discovering Duke Ellington's birthplace at 2129 Ward Place, N.W. in Washington. Although the original house had been demolished, Grant began efforts to mark the location in 1987. On the anniversary of Ellington's birth in 1989, a bronze plaque was placed on the building now occupying the site, with Ellington's son Mercer in attendance at the dedication ceremony.

Grant was also responsible for renaming Western High School as Duke Ellington High School (now, the Duke Ellington School of the Arts) and for renaming the Calvert Street Bridge as the Duke Ellington Bridge in 1974.

In 1964 Felix Grant was awarded the Order of the Southern Cross (the highest civilian honor the Brazilian government can bestow upon a foreigner) in recognition of his broadcasting efforts in behalf of Brazilian music and musicians. He also received honors from the City of Washington, including plaques, proclamations, and the designation of a "Felix Grant Day" in 1985. A radio music library at the University of Jamaica was named for him. He was chairman of the Brazilian-American Cultural Institute and president of Partners of Brasília. He established a scholarship fund under his name at the University of the District of Columbia to the benefit of jazz music students.

== Archives ==
The Felix E. Grant Jazz Archives are maintained by the University of the District of Columbia's Jazz Studies Program within the university library. The majority of the holdings consist of approx. 45,000 LP albums, 10,000 CDs, reel-to-reel tapes, audio cassettes, 45s, and 78s which were donated to the university by Grant. Books, periodicals, photographs, and other paper materials complement the sound recordings. Notable subjects covered within the holdings of the collection are:

- Felix Grant's interviews of radio personalities which include jazz giants such as Cannonball Adderley, Cab Calloway, Monty Alexander, Art Farmer, Johnny Hartman, Jimmy Rushing, Sonny Stitt, as well as those with more local flavor such as Barnee Breeskin, composer of "Hail to the Redskins", Tommy Gwaltney, original owner of Blues Alley and Shep Allen, manager of the Howard Theater, as well as Brazilian artists such as João Gilberto, Dorival Caymmi, Tania Maria and Leny Andrade, Flora Purim and Airto.
- The Lorton Reformatory Jazz Festival. Lorton was once the location of an event featuring some of the top names in jazz such as Ella Fitzgerald, Count Basie, Nancy Wilson, Oscar Peterson, and Ray Brown.
- Duke Ellington
