= Normal School for Colored Girls =

- Miner Normal School
- U.S. National Register of Historic Places
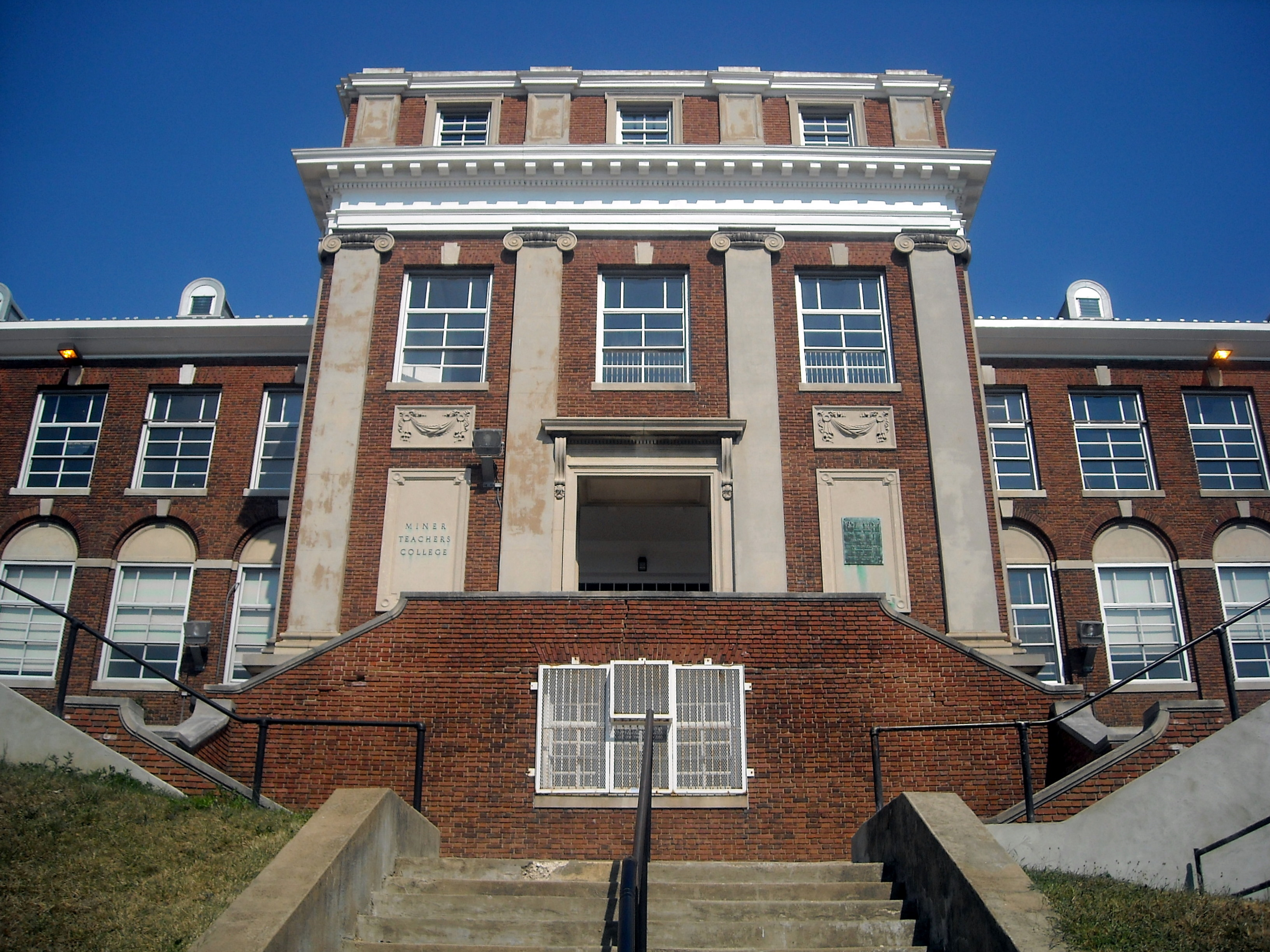
- Miner Normal School in 2008

- Location within Washington, D.C.
- Location: 2565 Georgia Ave., NW., Washington, D.C.
- Coordinates: 38°55′24″N 77°1′21″W
- Built: 1913
- Architect: Leon E. Dessez; Snowden Ashford
- Architectural style: Colonial Revival, Georgian Revival
- NRHP reference No.: 91001490
- Added to NRHP: October 11, 1991

Normal School for Colored Girls was established in Washington, D.C., in 1851 as an institution of learning and training for young African-American women, especially to train teachers. It was the first normal school in the District of Columbia and the fourth in the United States.

In 1913, when it was called Miner Normal School, it built a Colonial Revival school building on Georgia Avenue NW. The building is listed on the National Register of Historic Places.

In 1929, Congress accredited the school as the four-year Miner Teachers College.

In 1955, the college merged with Wilson Teachers College, a teaching school for white students, to become the District of Columbia Teachers College. That college would merge with two others in 1977 to become the University of the District of Columbia.

== History ==
=== Founding ===
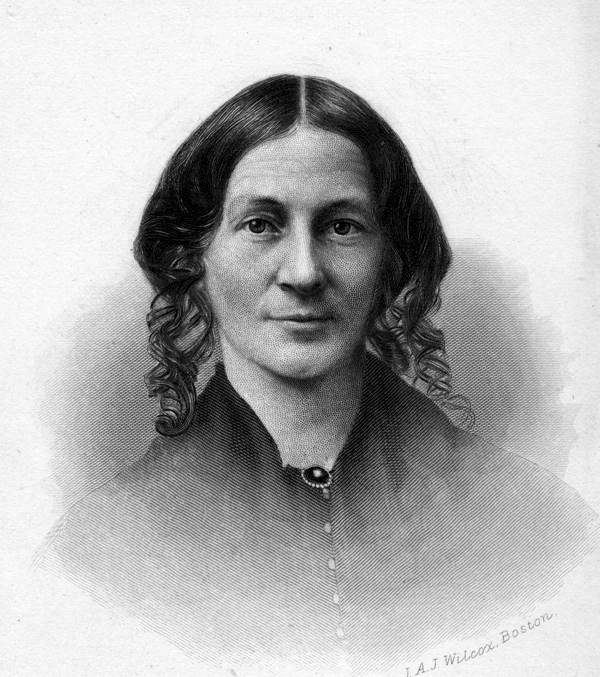
Myrtilla Miner, founder of Normal School for Colored Girls

Myrtilla Miner was a schoolteacher in Mississippi in the 1840s when she sought permission to conduct classes for African-American girls. After she was refused, she spent several years contemplating founding a school of her own. She moved to Washington, D.C., where she received encouragement from Henry Ward Beecher and funding from a Quaker philanthropist. She also faced opposition: from Washington Mayor Walter Lenox, who believed that education would make Blacks a "restless population", and from local white residents. "She met with opposition and some violence, but finally triumphed," the abolitionist newspaper The National Era would remark in 1857.

On December 3, 1851, her Normal School for Colored Girls and its six pupils began classes in a rented room about 14 feet square, in a frame house then owned and occupied as a dwelling by African American Edward Younger. Its emphasis from the outset was on training teachers, although it also offered primary schooling and classes in domestic skills. It was the first normal school in the District of Columbia and the fourth in the United States. In addition to rigorous academic training, Miner stressed hygiene and nature study.

Within two months of opening, school enrollment grew from 6 to 40. Despite hostility from a portion of the community, the school prospered with the help of continued contributions from Quakers and a gift from Harriet Beecher Stowe (sister of Beecher) of $1,000 of the royalties she earned from Uncle Tom's Cabin.

The following year, Frederick Douglass wrote in The North Star, his abolitionist newspaper:

For neatness and order, I have not seen it equal in any school of Washington, and I have seen several of the best. Miss Miner began with seven scholars, and has forty-five, and sometimes fifty, at the present time (two months from the time of its commencement,) but they are crowded into so small a room that they sit in three tiers, and during the drawing lesson, have not sufficient elbow-room to do as well upon their papers as they do upon the black-board. The benevolent friend who has been giving them their lessons, says they excel any other scholars she has ever taught in this branch, in readiness of apprehension and facility of execution. I have never seen a quicker perception of the analysis of sentences in girls of the same age; and in regard to deportment, I have never seen an impropriety, or any want of self-control in the school, constrained as they are for room, and deprived of the privilege of running out to play at recess, because the neighbors are so hostile to the establishment of such a school.

Miner raised $2,000 ($59,300 today) and borrowed $2,000 more to build the school's first building, a wood-frame structure behind the British legation on 20th Street NW, near New Hampshire Avenue NW just south of Dupont Circle.

As it grew, the school was forced to move three times in its first two years, but in 1854, it settled on a 3-acre (1.2-hectare) lot with a house and barn on the city's edge.

Around this time, Emily Edmonson enrolled in the school. To help protect the school and those involved with it, the Edmonson family took up residence on the grounds, and both Emily Edmonson and Myrtilla Miner learned to shoot.

In 1856, the school came under the care of a board of trustees, among whom were Beecher and wealthy Quaker Johns Hopkins. Others included Benjamin Tatham of New York; Samuel M. Janney of Loudoun County, Virginia; Samuel Rhoads and Thomas Williamson, Philadelphia; G. Bailey and L. D. Gale, Washington; H.W. Bellows, New York; C. E. Stowe, Andover. Its executive committee was B.J. Bowen, J.M. Wilson, and L.D. Gale, of Washington; Principal Miner; and Secretary William H. Beecher of Reading.

By 1857, Miner's failing health had reduced her connection with the school, and activist, teacher, and philanthropist Emily Howland was in charge. "She has now forty scholars, and several philanthropic Bostonians have become interested in the school, and propose to raise $20,000 to erect a building for a boarding-school, into which will be received day scholars, but which will be specially adapted to the education of teachers," The National Era reported in April.

The new school was to have room for 150 scholars, to accommodate "the applicants pressing upon it from the numerous free-colored blacks in the District and adjacent States", and separate housing for teachers and pupils, the National Intelligencer reported, adding, "The enlarged school will include the higher branches in its system of instruction." The board determined to raise $10,000 from churches and benefactors in Boston, and $1,000 from other churches in the principal towns of Massachusetts.

Lenox, several years out of the mayor's office, denounced the idea. Responding to a news item in a Boston newspaper that he had reprinted in the National Intelligencer, he wrote, "If I do not entirely mistake the opinion which the citizens of this District will entertain of the character and fatal consequences of this enterprise, they will almost universally, without distinction of party or class, emphatically protest against it, and will confidently expect that the advocates of this measure will promptly abandon it, as an unjust and dangerous interference with the interests and feelings of a separate independent community."

By 1858, six former students were teaching in schools of their own.

In 1860, the school was closed, and the next year, Miner went to California to regain her health.

=== Refounding ===
During the American Civil War, on March 3, 1863, the United States Senate granted the school a charter as the "Institution for the Education of Colored Youth" and named a board of directors: Miner, Henry Addison, John C. Underwood, George C. Abbott, William H. Channing, and Nancy M. Johnson. Miner returned to D.C. in 1864 but died shortly afterward.

From 1871 to 1876, the school was associated with Howard University. "Afterward, it developed an innovative agreement with the D.C. public school system. In exchange for using private funding to pay faculty salaries, graduates from the Miner School received preference in the hiring process at D.C.'s Black public schools. This arrangement lasted until the mid-1930s, and ensured that the Miner School remained a prominent component of the District's public school system for Black students", the National Park Service wrote.

At the school's annual board meeting on January 20, 1879, "The teachers' report stated that the senior class consisted of eight students and the junior of seven. A training school, consisting of twenty children, about five years old, was formed in November. The library has been increased during the year by purchases and donations. It now contains 400 textbooks and 218 books of reference".

In August 1879, renamed Miner Normal School, it became part of the District of Columbia public school system. It was housed, briefly it seems, in the Charles Sumner School building at 1201 17th Street NW.

By 1880, the school had moved to 1526 17th Street NW, to the east of Dupont Circle. The principal was Miss M.B. Briggs and the graduating class had 15 students. In March, the National Republican reported:

"The young lady pupils were very thoroughly examined in vocal music, physical and vocal culture, practice in teaching, psychology and didactics, English literature (American authors) and composition, practical arithmetic, and practice in the training school, reading, etc. The exercises were throughout exceedingly satisfactory to the joint committee in charge of the management of the school and gave assurance that the school is a decided success, reflecting the bigest credit upon the principal, Miss Briggs, and her assistant, Miss Line Jenn, in charge of the training school, which is a model of its kind."

In March 1890, an item in the Evening Star said, "T.F. Schneider, A.T. Britton and other property owners in the vicinity of the Miner school, on 17th street near Q, was referred to the board by the District Commissioners. The petitioners ask that the schools in that building be not continued there after the close of the present school year in view of the many improvements being made in that locality and the objection of many who have or intend to have houses in the vicinity of the school. The petition was referred to the trustees of the seventh division for report."

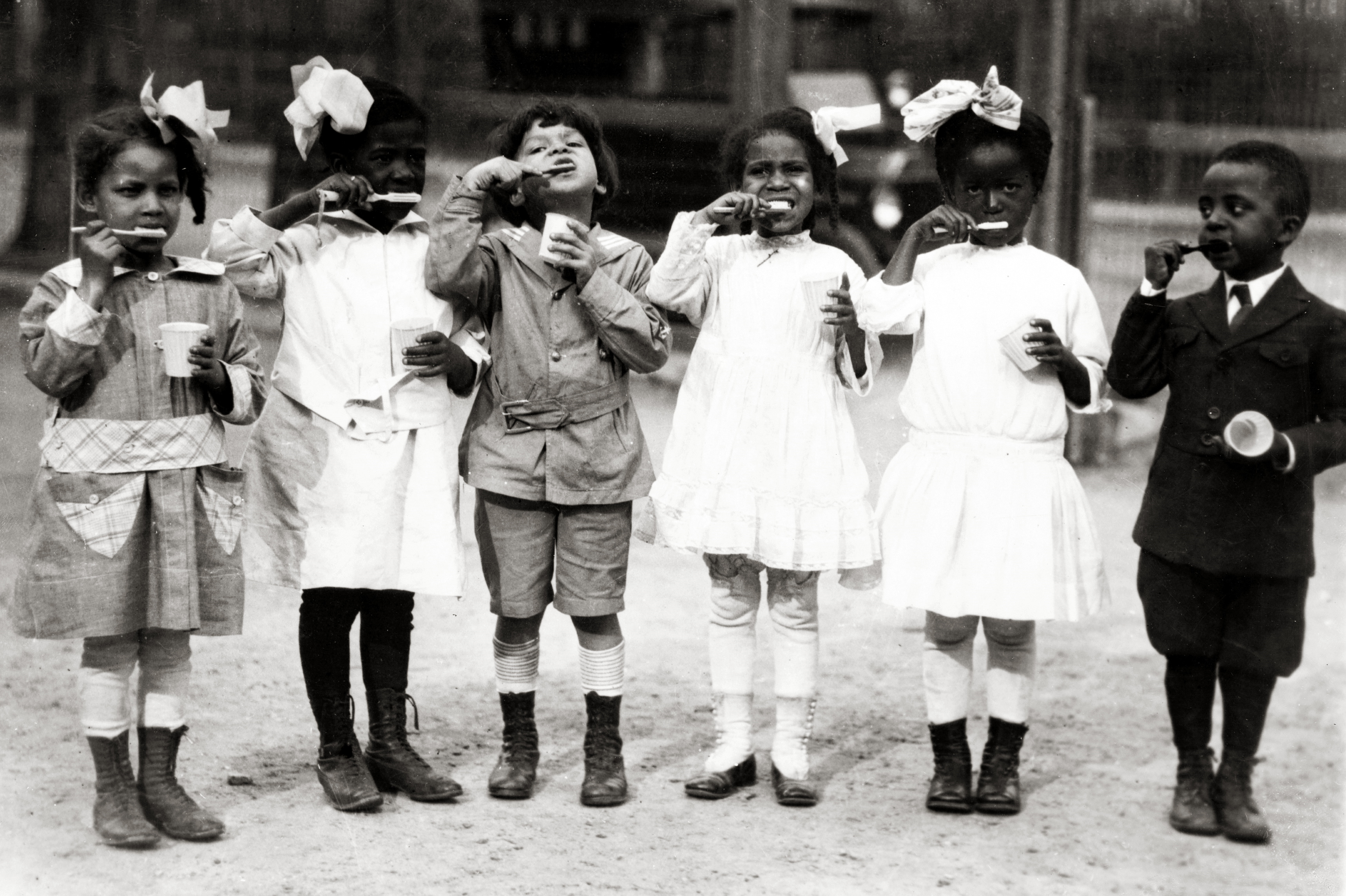
First graders from Miner Normal School, ca. 1910

=== College era ===
In 1913, the school built a Colonial Revival and Georgian Revival-style building on Georgia Avenue NW. It was designed by Leon E. Dessez and Snowden Ashford.

In 1929, an act of the U.S. Congress accredited the school as Miner Teachers College. Miner Teachers College and its predecessors were instrumental in the development of the black school system in the district between the 1890s and the 1950s and held a virtual monopoly on teaching jobs in black schools during that period. Many graduates found jobs in black school districts in other parts of the country, expanding the influence of the Miner school beyond the district.

In 1955, the school merged with Wilson Teachers College to form the District of Columbia Teachers College. "From 1900 until the end of school segregation in the 1950s, the school also provided hundreds of teachers and administrators to segregated schools throughout the South", the National Park Service wrote.

In 1976, after additional incorporations, the school was renamed University of the District of Columbia.

== Building ==
The 1913 building has been in continuous use for teacher-training classes, and has more recently also been used for community education programs.

The building was listed on the National Register of Historic Places in 1991.

In 2009, Howard University received an $800,000 grant from the National Park Service's Historic Preservation Fund to replace the building's roof and windows and begin to renovate the building's auditorium.

In 2023, Howard announced that the building would be further renovated for use by the Howard University School of Education and the Howard University Middle School of Mathematics and Science.

== Notable people ==
=== Students ===
- Aloncita Johnson Flood, New York City official
- Louise Daniel Hutchinson historian, attended the school.
- Ruby Hurley graduate, NAACP leader
- Dolores Kendrick, former Poet Laureate of the District of Columbia
- Alma Thomas, artist
- Carrie H. Thomas, physician, educator, and Woman's Relief Corps member
- West A. Hamilton, military officer and D.C. school board member

=== Faculty and staff ===
- Martha B. Briggs, principal, 1879-1883
- Marguerite Williams, American geologist
- Otelia Cromwell, scholar
- Hilda Rue Wilkinson Brown, teacher and alumni

== See also ==
- African-American history of Washington, D.C.
- National Register of Historic Places listings in the District of Columbia
