= Ruby Hurley =

American civil rights activist (1909–1980)

- Born: Ruby Ruffin; November 7, 1909; Washington, D.C., United States
- Died: August 9, 1980 (aged 70); Atlanta, Georgia, United States
- Education: Miner Teachers College; University of the District of Columbia; Robert H. Terrell Law School
- Known for: Civil rights activism
- Spouse: William L. Hurley

Ruby Hurley (November 7, 1909 – August 9, 1980) was an American civil rights activist. She was a leader in the Civil Rights Movement and administrator for the NAACP, and was known as the "queen of civil rights".

== Early life and education ==
Ruby Ruffin was born on November 7, 1909, in Washington, D.C., to Alice and Edward R. Ruffin. After she graduated from Dunbar High School in 1926, she attended Miner Teachers College (now known as University of the District of Columbia) and Robert H. Terrell Law School. She worked briefly for the federal government and at the Industrial Bank of Washington. She married William L. Hurley, a lieutenant in the US Army Corps of Engineers in 1942. They ended the marriage in 1952.

In 1939, Hurley was on a committee that was tasked with arranging for a performance from Marian Anderson, an African-American opera singer who had been barred from singing at Constitution Hall by the Daughters of the American Revolution. The committee was able to secure a venue change and Anderson performed at an open-air concert on the steps of the Lincoln Memorial before a crowd of 75,000.

== Career with the NAACP ==
For the next four years, Hurley worked reorganizing the D.C. branch of the National Association for the Advancement of Colored People (NAACP), bolstering their youth council. Walter Francis White, who headed the NAACP, appointed Hurley to the position of national Youth Secretary in 1943. She moved to New York City and stayed in that role until 1950.

In 1951, she moved from New York to Birmingham, Alabama, to set up an NAACP office and oversee membership drives in Tennessee, Mississippi, Alabama, Georgia, and Florida. It was the first permanent NAACP office located in the Deep South. She became Regional Secretary of the NAACP's newly formed Southeast Regional Office the following year.

During her time in the South, Hurley "operated as a Black woman in a man's world -- both Black and white men," as all NAACP Presidents and Boards and virtually all those in charge of governments and businesses were male. Following the Brown v. Board of Education ruling in 1954, Hurley worked to implement racial integration in the South.

In 1955, Hurley joined with civil rights activists Amzie Moore and Medgar Evers, who was Field Secretary at the NAACP's Mississippi office, in investigating the murders of minister George W. Lee and 14-year-old Emmett Till. In order to interview witnesses for Till's case, Hurley wore cotton picker's clothes. She later joined in a tour to bring nationwide attention to the tragedy.

While she practiced Christian nonviolence, she appeared on the cover of Jet magazine's October 6, 1955, issue with a caption reading "Most Militant Negro Woman In The South". In 1956, Hurley helped to prepare the case of Autherine Lucy to be allowed to attend the University of Alabama. Hurley defense of marginalized groups extended beyond African Americans, such as when she condemned anti-Semitic leaflets being distributed in Birmingham by writing “It will not be difficult to wash away such hatemongering as more people speak out against it.”

During her time working for the NAACP in the south, Hurley traveled more than 40,000 miles by bus and car, often alone. Hurley's efforts were met with open hostility and she faced constant danger. Her house was attacked and she received obscene telephone calls. Following a riot at the University of Alabama campus, black taxi drivers offered protection, circling her home.

During her travels, sticking to her principles of never eating in segregated restaurants led to its own hardships: “I was never going to eat in segregated places. So, if I ran out of Hershey bars, I didn’t eat…ofttimes twenty-four hours I didn’t have anything to eat."

Hurley was forced to flee Alabama in the night on June 1, 1956, after the state barred the NAACP from operating there. She moved to Atlanta where she opened a regional office four months later. The headquarters became a focal point for civil rights organizers and Hurley worked alongside Vernon Jordan. Jordan and Fredericka Thompson Bradley assisted Charlayne Hunter-Gault and Hamilton E. Holmes in gaining admission to the University of Georgia in 1961. Following the assassination of Medgar Evers in 1963, Hurley convinced his widow Myrlie to have him interred at Arlington National Cemetery.

== Death and legacy ==
Hurley retired on March 31, 1978, and served as president of United Methodist Women. She died on August 9, 1980, in Atlanta. The Chattanooga–Hamilton County NAACP hosts an annual Ruby Hurley Image Awards. In 2009, Hurley was featured alongside Ella Baker on a 42-cent stamp.
