= University of the District of Columbia =

Public university in Washington, D.C., U.S.

Coordinates: 38°56′38.2″N 77°3′55.2″W

- Former names: List: Normal School for Colored Girls (1851–1879); Miner Normal School (1879–1929); Miner Teachers College (1929–1955); Washington Normal School (1873–1913); >Wilson Normal School (1913–1929); Wilson Teachers College (1929–1955); District of Columbia Teachers College (1955–1977); Federal City College (1966–1977); Washington Technical Institute (1966–1977); Antioch School of Law (1972–1986); District of Columbia School of Law (1987–1996)
- Motto: "Aspire, Accomplish, Take on the World"
- Type: Public historically black land-grant university
- Established: December 3, 1851; 174 years ago
- Founder: Myrtilla Miner
- Accreditation: MSCHE
- Academic affiliations: CUMU; TMSF; CUWMA
- Endowment: $80 million
- President: Maurice Edington
- Administrative staff: 3,747 (fall 2018)
- Students: 4,202 (fall 2024)
- Undergraduates: 3,610 (fall 2024)
- Postgraduates: 592 (fall 2024)
- Location: Washington, D.C., United States
- Campus: 23 acres (0.093 km^{2}); Large city
- Colors: Red and gold
- Nickname: Firebirds
- Sporting affiliations: NCAA Division II – ECC
- Mascot: Felix the Firebird
- Website: udc.edu

The University of the District of Columbia (UDC) is a public historically black land-grant university in Washington, D.C., United States. The only public university in the city, it traces its origins to 1851 and opened in its modern form in 1977. The university offers workforce and certificate programs in addition to associate, baccalaureate, master's, professional and doctoral degrees. Its schools include the College of Arts and Sciences, School of Engineering and Applied Sciences, School of Business and Public Administration, College of Agriculture, Urban Sustainability and Environmental Sciences, David A. Clarke School of Law and UDC Community College.

The university's main campus is at Van Ness in the North Cleveland Park neighborhood. Other campuses and sites include the Lamond-Riggs campus, Congress Heights campus, aviation facilities at Ronald Reagan Washington National Airport and the UDC Firebird Farm Research Farm in Beltsville, Maryland. UDC is a member school of the Thurgood Marshall College Fund.

== History ==
The University of the District of Columbia was consolidated on August 1, 1977, through the merging of Federal City College, Washington Technical Institute, and District of Columbia Teachers College. The university traces its founding to the earliest of its predecessor institutions (Normal School for Colored Girls) which was founded in 1851.

=== Normal School for Colored Girls ===
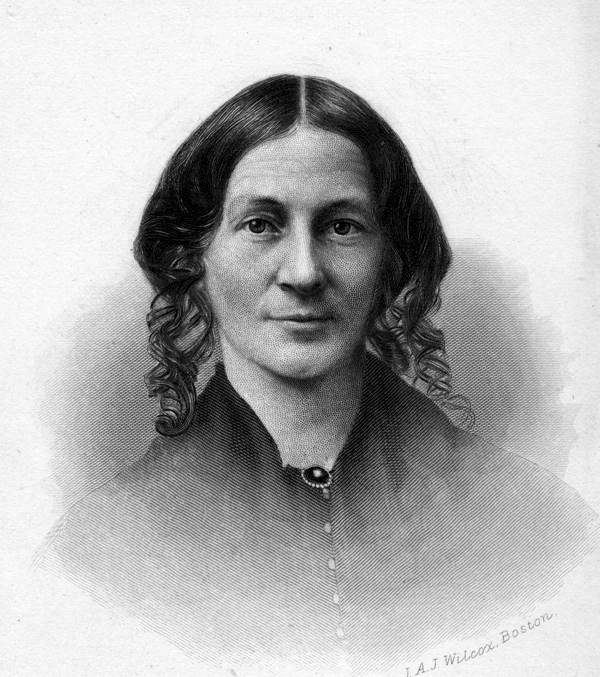
Myrtilla Miner (1815–1864), founder of the Normal School for Colored Girls in 1851, predecessor to UDC

In 1851, Myrtilla Miner founded the Normal School for Colored Girls, the first normal school in the District of Columbia and the fourth in the United States. Amid considerable racist opposition, the school began operations on December 3 with six students in a rented room about 14 feet square, in a frame house then owned and occupied as a dwelling by African American Edward Younger.

The school trained young black women to become teachers. Among its benefactors were the Society of Friends, Henry Ward Beecher, and his sister Harriet Beecher Stowe; Stowe donated $1,000 ($29,900 today) from the sales of her book Uncle Tom's Cabin. Although Mayor Walter Lenox believed that education would make Blacks a "restless population" and local residents formed some mobs in opposition to the school, the school remained open until the Civil War began. Reopened after her death, by 1879 the Normal School for Colored Girls was then known as Miner Normal School. It joined the D.C. public education system in 1879.

=== James Ormond Wilson Normal School ===
In 1873, the Washington Normal School, a teaching school for white girls was established in Washington, D.C. In 1913, it was renamed the James Ormond Wilson Normal School.

=== District of Columbia Teachers College ===
In 1929, the United States Congress made Miner Normal School and James Ormond Wilson Normal School four-year teachers' colleges: Miner Teachers College for African Americans and Wilson Teachers College for white people. On July 1, 1955, following Brown v. Board of Education, the two schools merged into the District of Columbia Teachers College.

=== Federal City College and Washington Technical Institute ===
On November 7, 1966, the District of Columbia School Reform Act, sponsored by U.S. Senator Wayne Morse (D-Oregon) and Representative Ancher Nelsen (R-Minnesota), was enacted as Public Law 89-791. It established two institutions, each with land-grant status and a $7.24 million endowment in lieu of a land grant:

- The Federal City College, a four-year liberal arts college. It was originally planned to be a small, selective college of about 700 students. By the time the college opened in 1968, however, admission was quite open and applications had soared to 6,000; some 1,400 students were placed by lottery. It was accredited in 1974.
- The Washington Technical Institute, a technical school. It was accredited in 1971.

Both closed with the 1977 consolidation.

=== University of the District of Columbia ===
Efforts to unify the D.C. Teachers College, Federal City College, and Washington Technical Institute under a single administrative structure began in earnest after the passage of the District of Columbia Home Rule Act. A merger of the institutions was approved in 1975, and on August 1, 1977, the three institutions were formally consolidated as the University of the District of Columbia, with Lisle C. Carter named its first president. The Council of the District of Columbia later passed legislation merging the District of Columbia School of Law with the University of the District of Columbia in 1996.

Beginning with the 2009–2010 academic year, UDC's programs were split into two separate institutions under an umbrella "university system"-style setup. A new Community College (UDC-CC) assumed UDC's associate's degree, certificate, continuing education, and workforce development programs, while the UDC Flagship campus continued with its bachelor's and graduate degree programs. While UDC-CC maintained an open enrollment policy for entry to its associate degree programs, a high school diploma no longer guaranteed admission into UDC's flagship programs.

In late 2012, the university reported that its average expenses of "$35,152 (~$47,332 in 2024) per full-time student] are 66 percent higher than expenses for comparable schools." To cut costs, UDC underwent a reorganization and eliminated several degree programs.

In 2012 and 2013, the university eliminated 97 full-time equivalent positions including abolished positions, executive appointments, and vacant funded positions. In late December 2012, the Board of Trustees approved a change in the university's executive administration and appointed Rachel Petty to serve as interim COO. During the spring of 2013 James E. Lyons Sr. was hired as an interim President to lead the institution through strategic planning. Since July 1, 2015, president Ronald Mason has led the resurgence of the university by implementing its Equity Imperative. UDC expanded its footprint through campus expansions and community extensions across the District of Columbia. In 2021, the university was ranked 59th in U.S. News & World Report annual list of Top Performers on Social Mobility for Regional Universities North.

The university launched the District of Columbia's Institute of Politics Policy and History in 2019. In response to the George Floyd protests in 2020, the university launched the Institute for the Study and Elimination of White Supremacy

== Campus ==
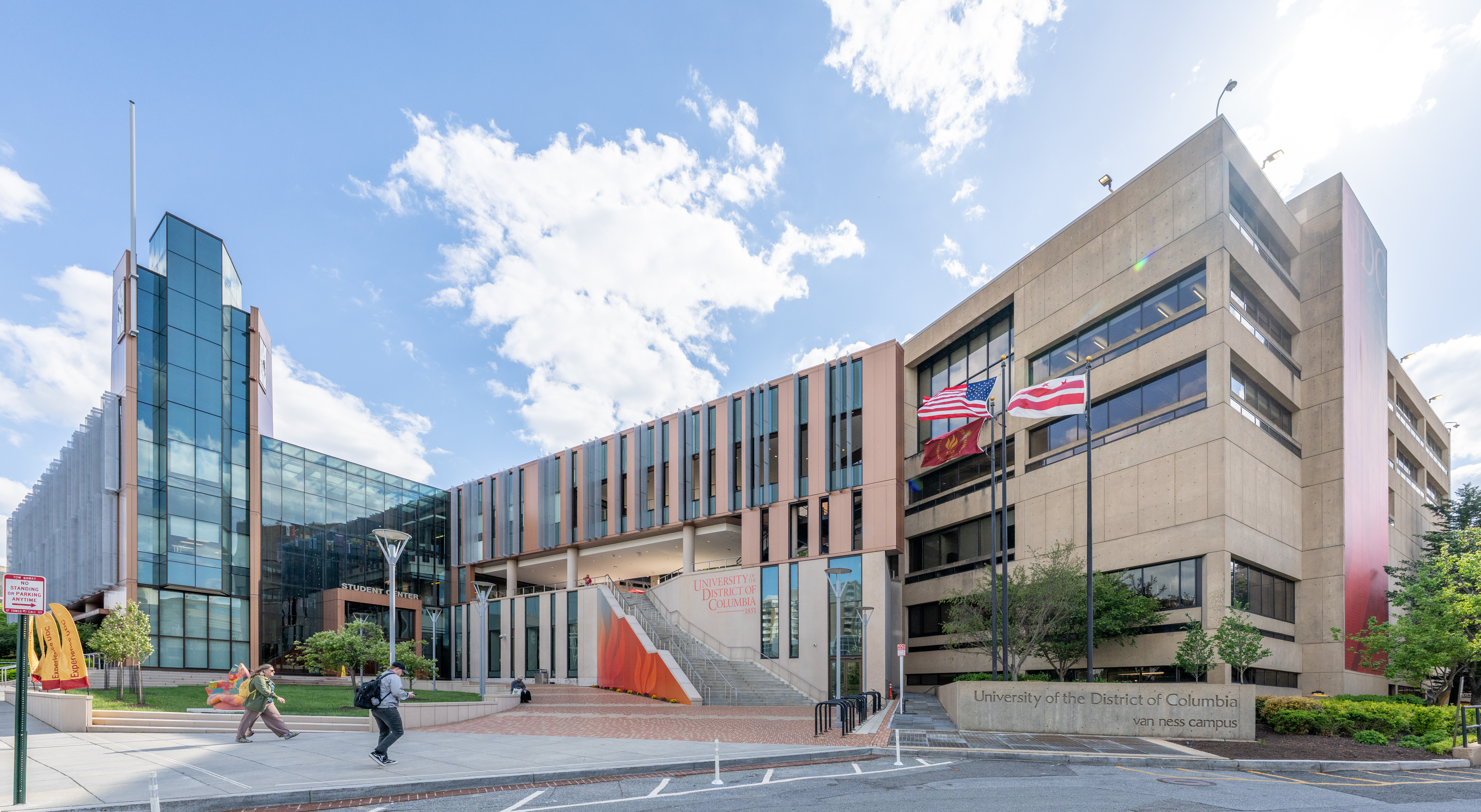
Student Center at Van Ness Campus (2026)

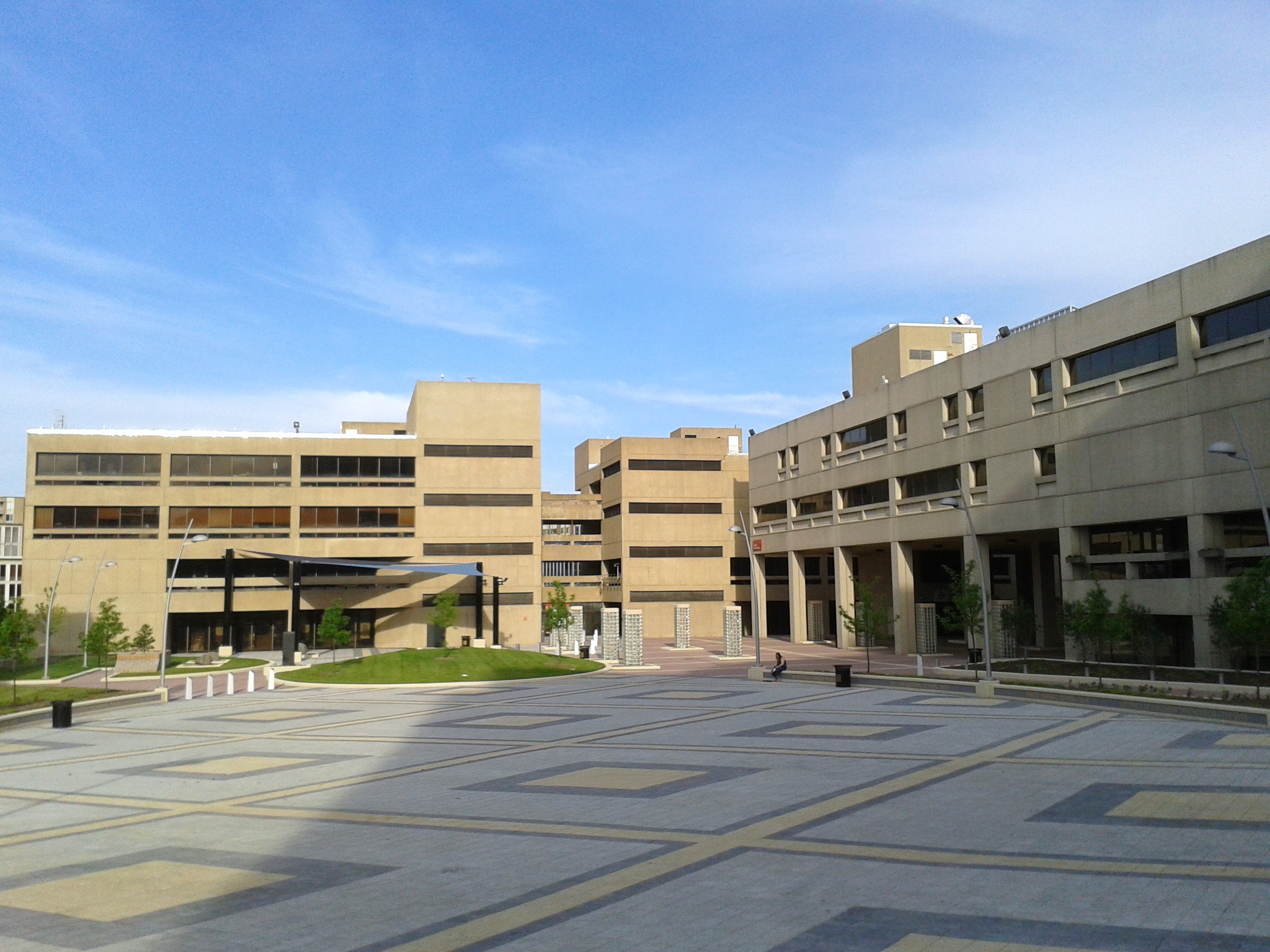
Dennard Plaza at the Van Ness campus

The flagship campus of UDC, known as the Van Ness campus, is in the North Cleveland Park neighborhood at Connecticut Avenue and Van Ness Street in Northwest Washington, D.C. It lends its name to the nearby Van Ness–UDC Metrorail station. Primarily a commuter school, UDC opened its first residential accommodations or dormitories in August 2010 by leasing an apartment building across the street from its campus. UDC plans to open a new residence hall on its main campus by 2012 that could house as many as 300 students. Construction of a new $40 million (~$53.9 million in 2024) student center also began in 2012.

The Van Ness campus opened in 1968 as the campus of the Washington Technical Institute, occupying buildings vacated by the National Bureau of Standards. Following the announcement of the UDC in 1975, work began on redeveloping the campus, with the construction of Buildings 32, 38, and 39 completed in 1976. Seven additional buildings opened in 1981 at the conclusion of a second phase of construction. The DCTC facilities at the old Wilson Teachers College building at 11th and Harvard Streets, NW and at the Franklin School were retired.

Mt. Vernon Square was selected as the site for Federal City College in 1968, and in 1973 FCC took control of the Carnegie Library, closed in 1970 in anticipation of the D.C. Public Library's move to the Martin Luther King Jr. Memorial Library. Funding for the campus did not materialize until 1978, however. Facing declining enrollment and lack of funding, operations at the downtown campus were wound down in the 1990s, and the facilities shuttered. "UDC" was removed from the name of the nearby Mount Vernon Square Metro Station in 2001.

In January 2019, UDC leased property near its Van Ness campus as part of its project to improve its infrastructure.

=== UDC Police Department ===
The UDC Police Department (UDCPD) is an operating element within the Office of Public Safety & Emergency Management. The UDCPD is tasked with providing full-service policing for all UDC assets and stakeholders. The department consists of commissioned officers and non-sworn support staff. UDCPD officers have full authority to investigate crimes, respond to calls for service and effect arrests on any UDC property. OPSEM and the UDCPD are under the command of Marieo Foster who serves as the Chief of Police and Director of Public Safety.

== Academics ==
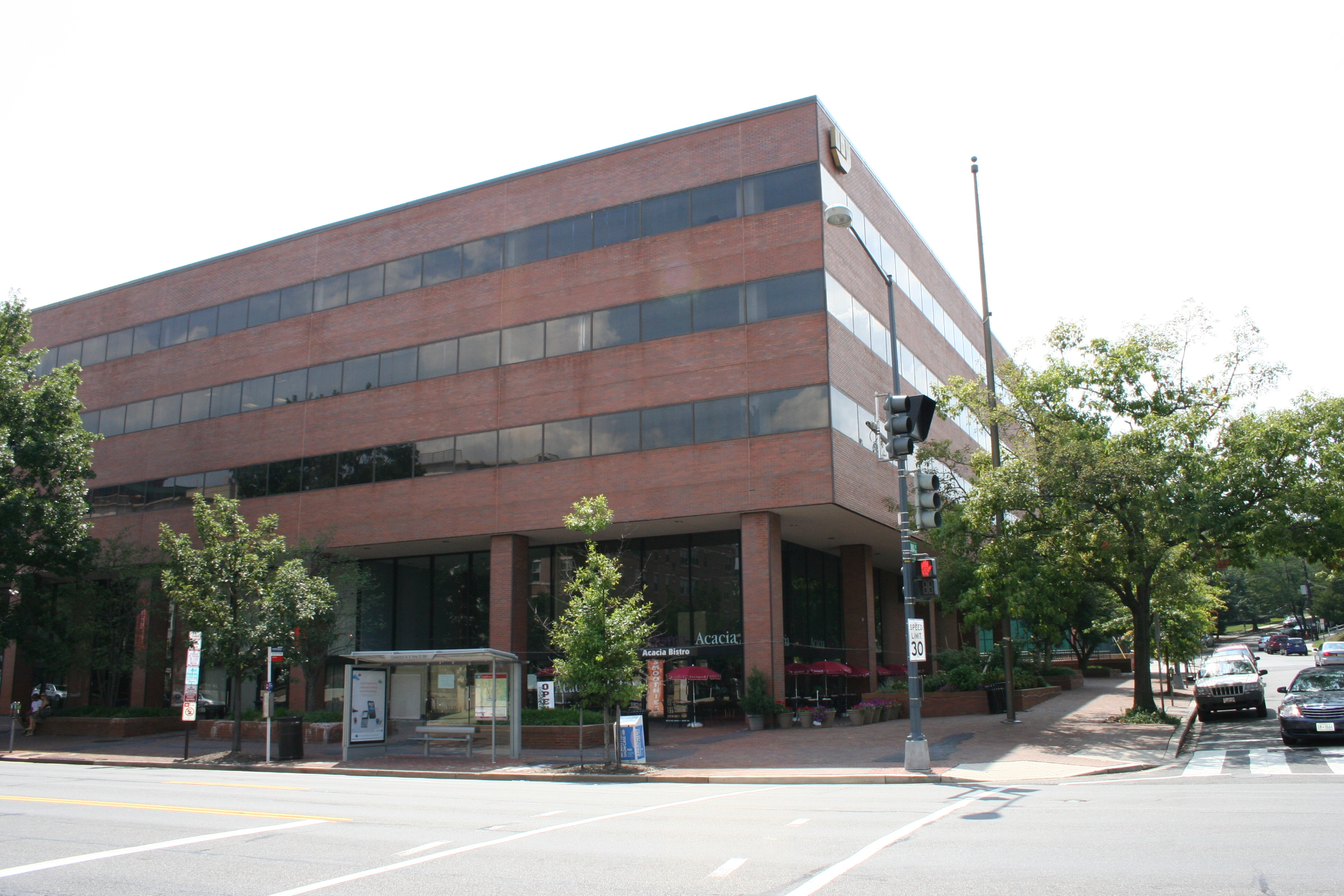
David A. Clarke School of Law

UDC offers 81 undergraduate and graduate degree programs. The Workforce Development Program also offers a variety of practical, nonacademic educational programs and training. The university is accredited by the Middle States Commission on Higher Education. IPEDs reports UDC's full-time student graduation to be 15%, although UDC graduates more District resident students than any other college or university in the District of Columbia. The university relaunched doctoral programs in 2019 with PhDs in Computer Science & Engineering and Urban Leadership & Entrepreneurship. UDC also has an accredited law school, the David A. Clarke School of Law.

The Felix Grant Jazz Archives are maintained by the University of the District of Columbia's Jazz Studies Program within the university library. The majority of the archives' holdings consist of about 45,000 LP albums, 10,000 CDs, reel-to-reel tapes, audio cassettes, 45s, and 78s which were donated to the university by Grant. Books, periodicals, photographs, and other paper materials complement the sound recordings.

=== Schools and colleges ===
- College of Arts & Sciences
- College of Agriculture, Urban Sustainability & Environmental Sciences
- School of Business & Public Administration
- School of Engineering and Applied Sciences
- David A. Clarke School of Law
- University of the District of Columbia Community College
- Division of Workforce Development and Lifelong Learning

=== Faculty ===
Among UDC's faculty are Paul Cooke, who taught English and directed several plays at the university for 22 years, including serving as president, and historian C.L.R. James who taught at the university from 1972 to 1980 and whose work is a staple of subaltern studies and postcolonial literature.

=== International programs ===
A 1996 academic partnership with the Modern Academy In Maadi (located in Maadi, a southern suburb of Cairo, Egypt) encouraged the material, physical, and intellectual growth of students, faculty, and staff of both institutions through Cairo-based UDC Bachelor's degrees, Computer Science and Business Administration management programs. In July 2001, the partnership included Accounting and Finance options in Business, Computer Engineering and Information Technology and Electronic Engineering and Communication Technology and graduate studies in Business Administration (MBA).

The Maadi branch campus partnership ended in June 2014. All matriculating students participated in a teach-out process and the final degrees were conferred in May 2016.

The UDC's adult education department had a collegial relationship with the University of Nairobi for several years, including faculty exchange and doctoral student sponsoring.

=== Tuition and scholarships ===
The University of the District of Columbia is a public university which receives funds from the D.C. government and U.S. federal government. Therefore, student fees are lower than private universities in the area, with in-state tuition being around $6,000. DC residents' fees are lower than students that live out of Washington D.C. In addition to its low cost, DC residents who apply to DC Futures Program can receive up to $8,000 In Scholarships.

=== Ranking ===
UDC is ranked #148 of 178 schools among Regional Universities North by U.S. News & World Report in its 2024 rankings.

== Student life ==
Undergraduate demographics as of Fall 2023
Race and ethnicity	Total
Black	54%
Hispanic	28%
Unknown	7%
International student	4%
Two or more races	3%
White	3%
Asian	1%
Economic diversity
Low-income (Note: The percentage of students who received an income-based federal Pell grant intended for low-income students.)	44%
Affluent (Note: The percentage of students who are a part of the American middle class at the bare minimum.)	56%

UDC has several Greek-lettered organizations, including all nine of the National Pan-Hellenic Council organizations.

UDC publishes The Trilogy, a student paper highlighting campus events and national and local news. The Flightpath yearbook focuses on graduating students and the years' activities.

UDC cable television, channel 19, is the District Government's non-commercial, adult education program service. UDC Cable TV 98 supports teaching, research and public service with educational-access television and instructional programming. Cable TV 98 operates an audio and video recording service center, electronic field and studio production and a video training center for Public-access television production.

== Athletics ==
The University of the District of Columbia athletic teams are known as the UDC Firebirds. The university is a member of the National Collegiate Athletic Association (NCAA) and competes at the Division II level as a member of the East Coast Conference (ECC). The university currently fields ten varsity sports, five men's sports: basketball, cross country, soccer, tennis, lacrosse; and six women's sports: basketball, cross country, tennis, indoor and outdoor track & field, and volleyball. In 2012, the university announced plans for athletic expansion, with the addition of men's and women's lacrosse in 2014 and soon thereafter men's and women's swimming.

== Notable alumni ==
- Branislav Andjelić, Serbian internet pioneer, economist and politician
- Nick Charles, member of the Maryland Senate and former member of the Maryland House of Delegates
- Tommy Davidson, actor and comedian
- Chase Fraser, professional lacrosse player
- Amadou Gallo Fall, NBA Africa executive and Basketball Africa League president
- Johnny Grier, first African-American referee in the National Football League
- Euphemia Haynes, first African-American woman to gain a PhD in mathematics in 1943
- Norma Holloway Johnson, United States federal judge
- Ruby Hurley, activist, organizer, national NAACP official
- Earl Jones, professional basketball player
- Dolores Kendrick, poet laureate of the District of Columbia
- Cathy L. Lanier, first female chief of police of the Metropolitan Police Department of the District of Columbia and head of NFL security
- Floretta Dukes McKenzie, superintendent of District of Columbia Public Schools
- Lyn McLain, cofounder of the DC Youth Orchestra Program
- Aldon Lynn Nielsen, poet
- Richard Pennington, chief of police of Atlanta
- Portia Shields, first female president of Albany State University
- Frank Ski, radio personality
- Abdul Thompson Conteh, professional soccer player
- Brian Thompson, designer of the United States $100 bill
- John Thompson, first African-American head coach to win a major collegiate championship in basketball
- Nadine Winter, first African-American woman elected to the Council of the District of Columbia
- Rasheim Wright, Jordanian basketball player
- Lennox Yearwood, president of the Hip Hop Caucus

== See also ==
- List of colleges and universities in Washington, D.C.
- Normal School for Colored Girls
- Felix Grant
