= Rosey E. Pool =

Dutch poet and anthologist (1905–1971)

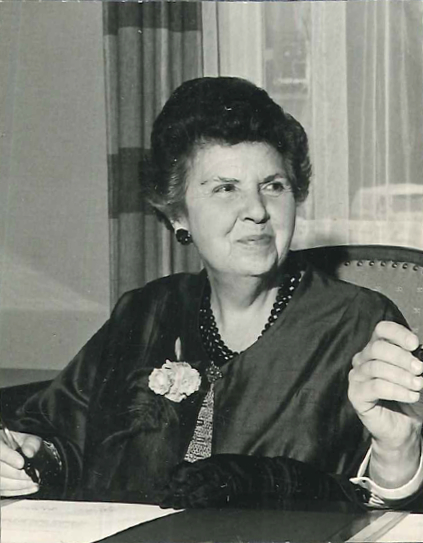
- Born: Rosa Eva Pool; 7 May 1905; Amsterdam, Netherlands
- Died: 29 September 1971 (aged 66); London, England
- Education: Friedrich-Wilhelms-Universität (Humboldt University)
- Occupations: Writer, teacher, and anthologist
- Notable work: Black and Unknown Bards: A Collection of Negro Poetry
- Spouse(s): Gerhard Kramer (1927 - 1935); Ursel "Isa" Isenberg (1920s - Pool's death)

Rosey E. Pool (born Rosa Eva Pool; 7 May 1905 – 29 September 1971) was a Dutch poet, resistor of the Nazi regime, and anthologist of African-American poetry. Raised in Amsterdam, Pool studied in Berlin and helped German Jews to flee to the Netherlands during the Nazi regime. After returning to Amsterdam in 1939, she taught at a Jewish school (with the diarist Anne Frank and her sister Margot Frank amongst her pupils) and continued resistance to the Nazi regime. In May 1943 Pool was captured by the Nazis and sent to Westerbork camp; her fellow resistors helped her escape six months later. Pool was the first person to translate Anne Frank's diary into English at the request of Frank's father. Pool's time in Westerbork transformed her interest in African-American poetry into a political and personal passion.

After moving to North London in 1948, Pool began to lecture, travel and write about Black American poets and her home became a regular meeting point for writers including Langston Hughes, W.E.B. DuBois, and Owen Dodson. In 1958 her work Black and Unknown Bards: A Collection of Negro Poetry, which was written in collaboration with Eric Walrond, became a breakthrough publication in Great Britain. Pool initially traveled to the United States for eight months in 1959, visiting many historically Black colleges and schools. She returned to America several times more and in 1967 was depicted on a mural of civil rights heroes at Alabama A&M University in Huntsville. She saw parallels between the African-American civil rights movement and the treatment of the Jewish people in Nazi Germany, and used her experience as a Holocaust survivor to lift voices fighting for justice in the United States.

== Biography ==
=== Early years ===
Pool was born and raised in a secular Jewish family in Amsterdam, Netherlands, to Louis Pool and Jacoba Jessurun. In the 1920s, she participated in Dutch Popular Front youth movements, such as the socialist Arbeiders Jeugd Centrale (AJC) and the Social Democratic Students Club (SDSC). In 1927, she was one of the founders of the Socialistische Kunstenaarskring (SKK, or Socialist Artists Circle). Pool's appreciation of African-American poetry began in 1925 during her studies at Amsterdam University when she discovered the works of Countee Cullen.

=== 1930s: PhD and activism in Berlin ===
In August 1927, shortly after her engagement to the Berlin jurist and later Hamburg senator Gerhard Kramer (1904–1973), Pool moved to Berlin. There, she studied English literature at the Friedrich-Wilhelms-Universität (currently known as the Humboldt University). Although she later claimed to be an anthropologist, she majored in philology. She wrote her dissertation on The Poetry of the American Negro, but was unable to finish this because of anti-Jewish measures by the Nazis. In 1935, Kramer and Pool divorced. From Berlin, Pool helped German Jews to flee to the Netherlands by providing them addresses. In January 1939, shortly after the Kristallnacht, Pool returned to Amsterdam and worked at Amsterdam University. She was collecting African-American poetry by this time and lecturing on the topic in left-wing circles.

=== 1940s: resistance during World War II, encounters with the Frank family, and time in Westerbork camp ===
During the Second World War, Pool taught at the Jewish Lyceum in Amsterdam (with Anne Frank, Margot Frank, and Edith Frank among her pupils). Writing about her time teaching the Frank children, Pool recalled that they were

"certainly not exceptional students. I was fond of both the girls, and neither I nor any of my friends and colleagues would have singled out the younger Frank girl as the one whose name would become a household word all over the world."

Pool further reflected on Anne's writing talent during her schooldays, noting that essays did not appear to be her strongest subject:

"What I do remember is her acute sense of humor, her sharp power of observation, and a certain amount of mime talent. Once I saw her do an excellent and hilarious impersonation of myself and the teaching staff, without her knowing that I had climbed onto a table in the next room to observe the performance."

Pool became principal of the Jewish Lyceum in 1940. In 1941 she served on a committee creating guidelines for language teaching in Jewish schools. Pool also became involved in a German Jewish resistance group named Van Dien, which had formed around the Tehuis Oosteinde. In September 1943, this resistance group helped her to escape from the Nazi transit camp Westerbork where she had been captured and taken to in May that year. When speaking about her experience in Westerbork in later life, Pool noted that she and other campmates would use lines from Negro spirituals to pray in secret, lacking a common faith but finding unity through Africa-American writing. After escaping Pool hid in the town of Baarn, wrote resistance poetry and compiled a bundle of African-American poetry.

==== Translation of Anne Frank's diary ====
Pool was the first person to translate Anne Frank's diary into English at the request of Frank's father Otto, who brought it to her in the summer of 1945; the translation was never published and was viewed as inadequate. Pool's parents, brother, and sister-in-law were killed at the Sobibor camp in Poland.

In 1948 Pool moved to London and lived with her partner Ursel "Isa" Isenberg, who worked as a radiologist. Together, Isenberg and Pool set up a travel agency and travelled all over the world.

=== 1950s and 1960s: expert in African-American poetry and international travel ===
After the war, Pool established correspondence - and friendships - with well-known African-American writers and poets including Countee Cullen, Langston Hughes, W. E. B. Du Bois, Naomi Madgett, Owen Dodson, Gordon Heath, Arthur Springarn, and Robert Hayden. From her London home, she became involved in the Black Arts Movement, both in Britain and the United States. She wrote articles introducing African arts to Western society and advocated for others to publish Black writers. In 1958 she worked with Eric Walrond to publish Black and Unknown Bards: A Collection of Negro Poetry; it established her as a leading voice for African-American poetry in Great Britain. In the same year she collaborated with Dutch writer Paul Breman on a Dutch anthology, Ik zag hoe zwart ik was.

Pool traveled to the United States as a Fulbright scholar and with UNCF funding (1959–1960), and was a guest lecturer at a number of colleges in the Deep South. In the United States, she contributed to the emancipation of African Americans in the Civil Rights Movement by comparing anti-Jewish measures of the Nazis with the segregation of the American South. When Pool was a guest lecturer at Alabama A and M in 1966, she organized two writers' conferences, with Samuel W. Allen (Paul Vesey), Margaret Burroughs, Dudley Randall and Mari Evans. The 1950s and 1960s saw Pool publish more titles with European publishers, partly because American publishing companies were not as interested: Beyond the Blues: New Poems by American Negroes (as editor, 1962) and Ik ben de nieuwe neger / I am the new Negro (as editor; dual translation in Dutch and English, 1965). Ed Simpkins explained: "it was Rosey Pool's [book] Beyond the Blues that first brought us together (...)." Beyond the Blues included a survey of African American poetry from the mid-eighteenth century onwards and focused on the work of contemporary young poets. An LP also entitled Beyond the Blues was produced in London by Argo in 1963, with featured readers including Brock Peters, Gordon Heath, Vinette Carroll, and Cleo Laine.

In 1965 Pool and her partner Ursel "Isa" Isenberg travelled across the Soviet Union; a trip which, for Pool, aligned with her sympathies towards communism and anti-fascist beliefs. Unlike her other international trips Pool documented little about her time in the USSR - in line with many left-leaning intellectuals of the time. Pool constantly spoke out against racial segregation as being the first step towards another Holocaust, and corresponded with many African-American writers about the USSR which (in comparison to Europe) was viewed as being more progressive towards people of color.

After Pool and Isenberg began following the Baháʼí Faith in 1965 they frequently aimed to seek out other believers on their travels.

In 1966 Pool was invited to be a jury member as part of the British Committee at the World Festival of Black Arts, held in Dakar, Senegal, in recognition of her expertise in African-American poetry. The other judges for the contest were Langston Hughes, Katherine Dunham, Davidson Nicoll, Cyprian Ekwensi, Gerald Moore, Abe Wale, and Clifford Simmons. The jury awarded prizes to the poet Robert Hayden (for his title A Ballad of Remembrance, published by Paul Breman) and Nelson Mandela. Hayden's work made it through to the competition through Pool's advocacy efforts.

Pool was also involved in broadcasting throughout her career - initially radio, then television - in the Netherlands, Britain, Canada and the United States.

== Personal life ==
Pool met her partner Ursel "Isa" Isenberg in Berlin in the 1920s; after the war, during which time Isenberg had fled Nazi Germany, they moved to London in 1948 and remained together until Pool's death in 1971. Pool frequently referred to Isenberg as her "best friend" in society due to global attitudes towards same-sex couples in the 20th century.

=== Religious beliefs ===
In May 1965, Pool and Isenberg became followers of the Baháʼí Faith. She was visible in promoting the religion after her conversion.

=== Death ===
Pool died in London in September 1971. The last article she wrote, about Anne Frank, was published in a Baháʼí journal the following year.

== Selected bibliography ==
=== Translator ===
- Emily Dickinson, Ten poems (Amsterdam: Vijf Ponden Pers, 1944)
- William Shakespeare, Three sonnets (Utrecht: G.M. van Wees, 1944)
- Annie M. G. Schmidt, Love from Mick and Mandy (London: Odhams Press, 1961)
- Annie M. G. Schmidt, Good luck Mick and Mandy (London: Odhams Press, 1961)
- Annie M. G. Schmidt, Take care, Mick and Mandy (London: Odhams Press, 1961)
- Claude Brown, Mijn Harlem (Rotterdam: Lemniscaat, 1966)

=== Author ===
- "African Renaissance", in: Phylon [1940–1956], vol. 14, no. 1 (1st Qtr, 1953), pp. 5–8
- "The Negro Actor in Europe", in: Phylon [1940–1956], vol. 14, no. 3 (3rd Qtr, 1953), pp. 258–267
- 'n Engelse sleutel. Een ABC over het "Perfide Albion" (Amsterdam: De Boer, 1957)
- (Co-editor with Eric Walrond), Black and Unknown Bards: A Collection of Negro Poetry (Aldington, Kent: Hand & Flower Press, 1958)
- (Co-editor with Paul Breman), Ik zag hoe zwart ik was. Poëzie van Noordamerikaanse negers. Een tweetalige bloemlezing van Rosey E. Pool en Paul Breman (Den Haag: Bert Bakker / Daamen N.V., 1958)
- (Co-editor with Paul Breman), Black all day. American negro poetry (Amsterdam: Instituut voor Kunstnijverheidsonderwijs, 1960)
- (Editor) Beyond the Blues: New Poems by American Negroes (Lympne, Kent, England: Hand and Flower Press, 1962)
- "The Discovery of American Negro Poetry", in: Freedomways. A quarterly review of the Negro Freedom Movement, Fall 1963, vol. 3, no. 4.
- (Editor) Ik ben de nieuwe neger (Den Haag: Bert Bakker, 1965)
- "Fling me your challenge. Commentary On The Literary Scene", in: Negro Digest, December 1965, vol. XV, no. 2, pp. 54–60
- "Robert Hayden: Poet Laureate", in: Negro Digest, June 1966, vol. XV, no. 8, pp. 39–75.
- Lachen om niet te huilen (Rotterdam: Lemniscaat, 1968)
- "Anne Frank: The Child and the Legend", in: World Order: Spring 1972, Vol. 6, No. 3
- "'Grand Prix de la Poezie' for Robert Hayden", in: World Order: Summer 1983, Vol. 17, No. 4
