= Gloria Oden =

American poet

- Born: October 30, 1923
- Died: December 16, 2011 (aged 88)
- Education: Howard University (B.A, J.D.)
- Known for: American poet, editor
- Relatives: Georgia E. Oden (sister)

Gloria Catherine Oden (October 30, 1923 – December 16, 2011) was an American poet, editor and retired professor of English. She was nominated for the Pulitzer Prize in 1979 for Resurrections, a collection of poems that responded to the unsolved murder of her mother and sister in their home in Washington, D.C.

== Early life and education ==
Gloria Oden was born in Yonkers, New York, on October 30, 1923. As the youngest daughter of six born to an African Methodist Episcopal Zion Church minister and a college-educated mother, Oden was instilled early on with a respect for education and intellect – she, along with her siblings were required to memorize and recite poetry. Additionally, her early religious training with Protestant rituals and hymns introduced her at a young age to the structures and rhymes of poetry, causing her professor (Carroll L. Miller) to describe her as a "Black Puritan" and a critical little "Blue Stocking". Oden's childhood was also influenced by estrangement from her siblings and parents due to an eight-year gap in age from her next closest sibling. Of this childhood she describes,

My life from my beginning was a restricted one. I wasn't raised on the street, in the neighborhood, but within a family where, as the youngest, I was remote in years from my sisters in brothers who united as one. My father took seriously his role in those harsh years, his role as a leader in the community and having his children as examples. I resented it growing up but the value of it – self discipline, focus – I can appreciate as fair trade off.

At the same time Oden expressed a close attachment to her father's congregation. It is from this congregation, which she describes as being composed of every economic and physical spectrum from the "chalk-faced, blond-haired, blue-eyed black boy" to the "serpent-eyed, ebony-hued girl," that she learned to disregard color.

Oden attended integrated schools, graduating from New Rochelle High School in 1939, largely unaware of issues of racial discrimination occurring across the country. Of this childhood, she recalls:

From elementary school on through high school in highly integrated schools, there were few to no other black children in either the classes I took. Why that was is another story but not anything I gave any thought to while going to school. Because I never went to other children's home to play (and they never came to mine).

She attended Howard University, "the family university", for both her undergraduate and law school education, receiving her BA in 1944 and her JD in 1948. Howard University was a significant change given a childhood largely separated from her peers.

If you ever get a chance to read RESURRECTIONS there is a poem in there about my mother taking me to Howard dressed in a pink dotted-Swiss dress with a big bow on the back, a large bow on my hair and wearing Mary–Janes. No lie,

she writes.

== Career ==
Oden never practiced law. According to Oden, "As black Americans well knew, if they didn't have a profession, they could not expect much of life. I was educated to teach or pursue the law. I did not care to do either..." Instead, after graduation she chose to remain in Washington DC and take a government job before moving to New York City in 1951 to take a position clerking for The National Infantile Paralysis Foundation headed by Basil O'Connor. Oden also spent three months in Israel in the early 1950s during the "In-gathering," when numerous Israelis from around the world migrated to the newly founded state of Israel. When Oden returned to New York, she moved to lower Manhattan to an apartment on East Fourth Street where she lived for many years.

From 1961 to 1978, Oden served in various editorial positions with academic journals and publishing houses including as editor of the American Journal of Physics. Around 1963 she took a job in personnel at the mid-town Manhattan law firm, Paul, Weiss, Rifkind, Wharton and Garrison, where Pauli Murray, who graduated from Howard four years before her work as a lawyer. Oden left the law firm to publish a magazine, The Urbanite, meant to publish content in opposition to Ebony. When the magazine folded, she spent five years at the American Institute of Physics and then a year and a half at the Institute of Electrical and Electronics Engineers. Oden then moved back into the publishing world, editing math and science textbooks for Appleton-Century-Crofts and then Holt, Rinehart and Winston. She took graduate courses at New York University from 1969 to 1971, eventually joining the faculty at the University of Maryland, Baltimore County (UMBC), where she progressed from assistant professor to full professor before her retirement in 1996. Oden mainly taught creative writing courses while at the UMBC as well as pursuing scholarly research on Charles Chesnutt and Charlotte Forten Grimké.

== Poetry ==
Gloria Oden began writing poetry at an early age, from first grade on through college and law school. She self-published her first book of poetry, The Naked Frame, a collection of love poems and sonnets in 1952 after reading an article by Mark Van Doren in The New York Times in which he wrote "that a poet needs to put his work out before the public to find out how much of a poet he was." This was no small gamble for Oden, who spent the equivalent of 18 weeks' salary to print The Naked Frame, taking out a loan by borrowing money against a life insurance policy.

As it turned out, Oden was very much a poet, and this early publication led to what she described as "my introduction to the world of poetry." This slender book of 24 poems showcased both Oden's lyricism and mastery of poetic forms, that was neither afraid to be intellectual nor erotic. This is clear, for example, from "iii":

Do you consider, when on me thoughts rest,
The turmoil of this soul; the needing known,
Within my heart where fierce winds crumble stone,
To feel your body's weight my length abreast?
When such pause comes, have you, perchance, then guessed
The fury of Desire's madding tongue.
That lashes this frail fresh still, yet unstrung
From recent onslaughts of its parapets?
How heavily upon my nipples lain
Has yearning for the fullness of your lips;
And for the absence of your touch, bleak pain?
If with such things thought has not come to grips,
I pray a shaft of light implode your brain
Before to some perversion this love slips.

The Naked Frame received a favorable review from J. Saunders Redding in the Afro-American (Baltimore). Around that same time, Oden was introduced to the work of Richard Wilbur and joined a small group studying with Kimon Friar including James Merrill. This was Oden's first experience with a community of writers: "I was amazed as I did not know of any young people writing poetry," she recalls. Around the same time, she was encouraged to apply for a John Hay Whitney Opportunity Fellowship for Creative Writers, which she received (from Arna Bontemps). Oden followed this up by applying for and obtaining a Yaddo which resulted in a two-month residency. There she became acquainted with Elizabeth Ames and Stephen Stepanchev. Upon her return to New York she began classes with Louise Bogan and Léonie Adams at NYU and YMHA (now the 92nd Y).

Throughout the 1950s and 1960s, Oden continued to publish in small magazines including The Muse, Saturday Review, The Canadian Forum, The Blue River Poetry Journal, Quicksilver, and Oak Leaves. An early rejection in 1959 by Saturday Review led to a meeting with the poetry editor John Ciardi who was also then the director of the Bread Loaf Writers' Conference, to which he invited her to apply. She received a scholarship and attended what she would remember as a very important experience for her. Ciardi introduced her to Robert Frost, and it was there that she had her poetry workshopped by Dudley Fitts. During this period she was already in correspondence with Kenneth Rexroth who prodded and sent her many of his books. Among the young poets there at the same time were Richard Yates, who she describes as "born in Yonkers like me but on the other side of town," and Edward Wallant, who worked two blocks away from her in New York. Significantly, it was also the first time Oden had met any young black writers. These included John A. Williams, Sylvester Leaks, and Herbert W. Martin.

Around 1960 Oden also met and became friends with Langston Hughes, exchanging work and friendly correspondence up until his death. In fact, Oden's last letter to Hughes was dated May 11, 1967, eleven days before Hughes' death. She wrote to thank him for a copy of "Ask Your Mama" and tell him she was working on a new short story. Of their friendship she recalls, "He would call me at midnight for a chat which I was honored to have but also a bit annoyed because I went to bed at ten in order to have enough sleep for my job. I did not pursue the Village lifestyle except to accept a couple of invitations to read poems." She also was invited to and accepted into various anthologies of African American poetry including American Negro Poetry: An Anthology edited by Arna Bontemps (1963), New Negro Poets U.S.A. edited by Langston Hughes (1964), and Kaleidoscope: Poems by American Negro Poets edited by Robert Hayden (1967). Oden submitted work for a second book to Houghton Mifflin Company in 1961 who expressed interest in her work at a later date.

Oden's second book of poetry, Resurrections, responded to the unsolved murder of her mother, then 87, and her eldest sister, 65, in their home in Washington DC in August 1974. The crime also remained without motive or suspect. For many years (from 1980) the book for which Oden was nominated for the 1979 Pulitzer Prize, remains out of print. The 49 poems are composed of memories of her family, her childhood as well as love poems that celebrate the body and physical passion. She employs mainly a formal meter that is heavily iambic. The book was positively reviewed by the critic Jascha Kessler who wrote

It is simply wonderful, I think, that Gloria Oden praises life and love in poems interwoven with an oppressive past, a past made the more oppressive by the burden of the double murder of the two women most import in her life ... I hope that her book, Resurrections, may come to be better known, and not simply obscured and lost among the many books coming out of the small press publishing these days.

Oden's third book, The Ties that Bind (1980), is a memorial to her father and serves as a testament to his impact on her life, as the introductory poem narrates:

With childhood's eye I see him:
Enthroned upon his pulpit, he sits
Between his deacons in Pentecostal trinity;
in the sober elegance of serge,
With childhood's ear I hear him:
Whether resonant with God's message or lining
out the common meter of a hymn, he voices
our resolve to forsake this world
of glittering seduction for the untarnishing treasure
what is to come.

Written twenty-five years after his death and dedicated to the "Black" church, the slender book's eight hymn-like poems are organized by days of the week. Starting on "Every Monday," when "Father took/ the train to New York City" she follows her father's methodical schedule, as he devotes particular days to maintenance of the buildings, visiting the sick, attending meetings, hosting church events as well as presiding at services where she ends on Sunday.

Oden's fourth book Appearances, published in 2004 at the age of 81, is by far her most ambitious work both in length (numbering almost 90 poems and over 200 pages) and in content. Doing away with much of her more formal or metered style of the past these poems vary in form and length, employing a great deal of free verse. While the majority of the poems are intensely personal (for which she expresses unease: "It discomfits me /that I should be the central / matter of my poems when savage and / brutal deeds hurl themselves /as headlines around the world"), Oden also engages with other poets such as Ciardi, Tennyson and T. S. Eliot while exploring a number of philosophical questions raised in the writings of Plato, Santayana, Spinoza, and Martha Nussbaum. In these poems, she considers the relationship between reason and emotion, and the connection of the body to the mind, often siding with feeling and imagination while stilling insisting that action ultimately rules over the page.

Even within her focus on the personal, like in the earlier collections, in Appearances, Oden investigates a wider range of topics from family, love, aging, happiness, and sexual passion. As the title would suggest, there is also a newfound openness in these verses, a shedding of past experiences. For example, while Oden makes clear her respect for her father, she also expresses some relief in his death which allowed her both to escape a bad marriage and to write freely: "It well may be I'm not/ much of one now but,/ safely, I can say/ had Father not died/ when he did, it/ is unlikely I/ would be the poet I/ regard myself today." These verses also show her coming to terms with a quite literal meaning of appearance, as it was clear that Oden did not live up to her mothers' expectations. Instead it is through poetry that she finds some sort of confidence as a result, fearlessly declaring: "The woman my husband chose/ not to marry explicitly/ informed me I was not/ very attractive. If/ she thought that was news,/ she was foolishly mistaken" ("A Small Step"). The overriding theme of Appearances, however, is sexual passion, as Oden juxtaposes a loveless first marriage with a content and largely passionless second marriage, to a sudden romance with a younger man, to whom she declares "you / inhabit me like smoke / in a house on fire;" ("Query"). It is a collection that hides nothing.

Most recently (March 2011) Gloria Oden published Homage which she describes as a praise song for the small black churches across America at slavery's end, congregations earnest in their pursuit of the rights and privileges of democracy, of which Memorial AMEZ of Yonkers was an example. Three poems were published in Inertia Magazine in 2008. Since 1996, when she retired from UMBC, she has been living in Catonsville, Maryland.

== Major influences ==
Gloria Oden studied poetry with Kimon Friar, Louise Bogan, and Léonie Adams, and later associated with Arna Bontemps, Robert Hayden, Marianne Moore, Elizabeth Bishop and Mark Van Doren. She was friends with Langston Hughes and Sam Allen, read with Amiri Baraka and Sonia Sanchez, and worked in the same law firm as Pauli Murray. As Oden herself describes, "I am sure but if you realize how today young poets know each other, have opportunities to publish each other, move themselves forward in the literary world, you see how much of a hit and miss it was for me. Had I never met any of the persons I mentioned, I would not exist as a poet."

As critic C.K. Doreski argues, a key influence on Oden's poetry, especially her earlier work, was Elizabeth Bishop. Oden recalls coming across one of Bishop's collections in 1955/6 and writing to her. The two began a correspondence and Bishop later recommended Oden for her Yaddo residency. Oden didn't come across many black poets until Bread Loaf several years later, so these types of interracial mentorships, especially with white women were formative for Oden. Marianne Moore was another source of early encouragement. According to Oden: "The first thing she did was to feed me a sandwich of cream cheese and have me drink a glass of milk because I looked a bit thin to her. Then she took me piece by piece through everything I had handed in and critiqued. She had read it all before hand and when I left she gave me several legal-size yellow-lined pages of her criticisms bearing at the top 'Full of merit; threatened by trifles.' Joy!" It was also Moore her got Oden to stop signing her poems G.C. Oden, which she initially did because of prejudice against female poets.

As Oden's years of correspondence with Langston Hughes demonstrate, he also served as an important mentor to her. However, her relationship to "black poetry" was somewhat complicated – she often felt she did not belong or that her writing was neglected because her poetry "was not pointedly 'black' in content, style, or language." Nevertheless, as critic Doreski points out, Oden's concern with poetry not just as a vehicle for protest but as an art form meaningful to all, "places her well within the formalist tradition of Countee Cullen and Elizabeth Bishop." Her various communities clearly thought of her this way - for example, she was among the group of Black poets, artists, critics, and scholars who gathered at the University of Dayton during the weekend of Oct. 20, 1972, to celebrate the centennial of the birth of Paul Laurence Dunbar, reading alongside Alvin Aubert, Nikki Giovanni, Michael S. Harper, Etheridge Knight, Sonia Sanchez, Raymond Patterson, Lorenzo Thomas, John Oliver Killen, Paule Marshall, J. Saunders Redding and the then very young Alice Walker. Her view, expressed in the unpublished essay "Negritude, So What!" (sent to Langston Hughes in a 1965 letter), that "The Negro in the United States is not African. He is American," nevertheless, was important to how she saw her poetry. As she expresses below, Oden could never forget she was black, but because she was black she saw her responsibility to reach all Americans as even greater:

Being both artist and Negro is no easy thing in the United States. Usually the Negro straddles two worlds. First, obviously, the Negro world into which he is born. More than likely the second world – the one in which he works – will be white. There is a very important third world, however, and integrated world made up of white and non-white participants in a racial dialogue. Burdensom or not, fair or not, I believe it is a particular responsibility of the Negro artists to make the most of this third world, not be wringing from their white opposites admissions of inherited guilt, inferiority, or whetever admissions years of anger and guish have bred in him, but by working with them to give major dimension and substance to an image of American which must encompass the contributions of all the various racial and religious groups that are joined on this continent.

== Bibliography ==
=== Poetry ===
- The Naked Frame: A Love Poem and Sonnets. New York: Exposition Press, 1952.
- Resurrections. Homestead: Olivant Press, 1978.
- The Ties That Bind. Homestead: Olivant Press, 1980.
- Appearances. San Francisco: Saru Press International, 2004.
- Homage. Irving Place Publishers, 2011.

=== Articles ===
- Oden, Gloria C. "Bring It Down Front: It's About Time." Essence, Vol. 5, No. 9 (January 1975): 8.
- --. "Chesnutt's Conjure as African Survival." MELUS. 5 (Spring, 1978): 38–48.
- --. "The Journal of Charlotte L. Forten: The Salem-Philadelphia Years (1851–1862) Reexamined." Essex Institute Historical Collections. 119 (1983): 119–36.
- --. "Literature and Politics: The Black Investment." Negro American Literature Forum, Vol. 3, No. 2 (Summer 1969): 49–50.

=== Chapters in edited collections ===
- Oden, Gloria C. "The Black Colonial Experience (and Somewhat Beyond): Search and Research." Humanization of Knowledge in the Social Sciences: A Symposium, ed. Pauline Atherton Cochrane (1972), 18-28.

=== Reviews ===
- Oden, Gloria C. "Book Review of Knees of a Natural Man: The Selected Poetry of Henry Dumas." MELUS 15.3 (Autumn, 1988): 135–136.
- --. "Book Review of We Are the Young Magicians by Ruth Forman." MELUS 18.3 (Fall, 1993): 111–112.
