= Dolores Kendrick =

American poet

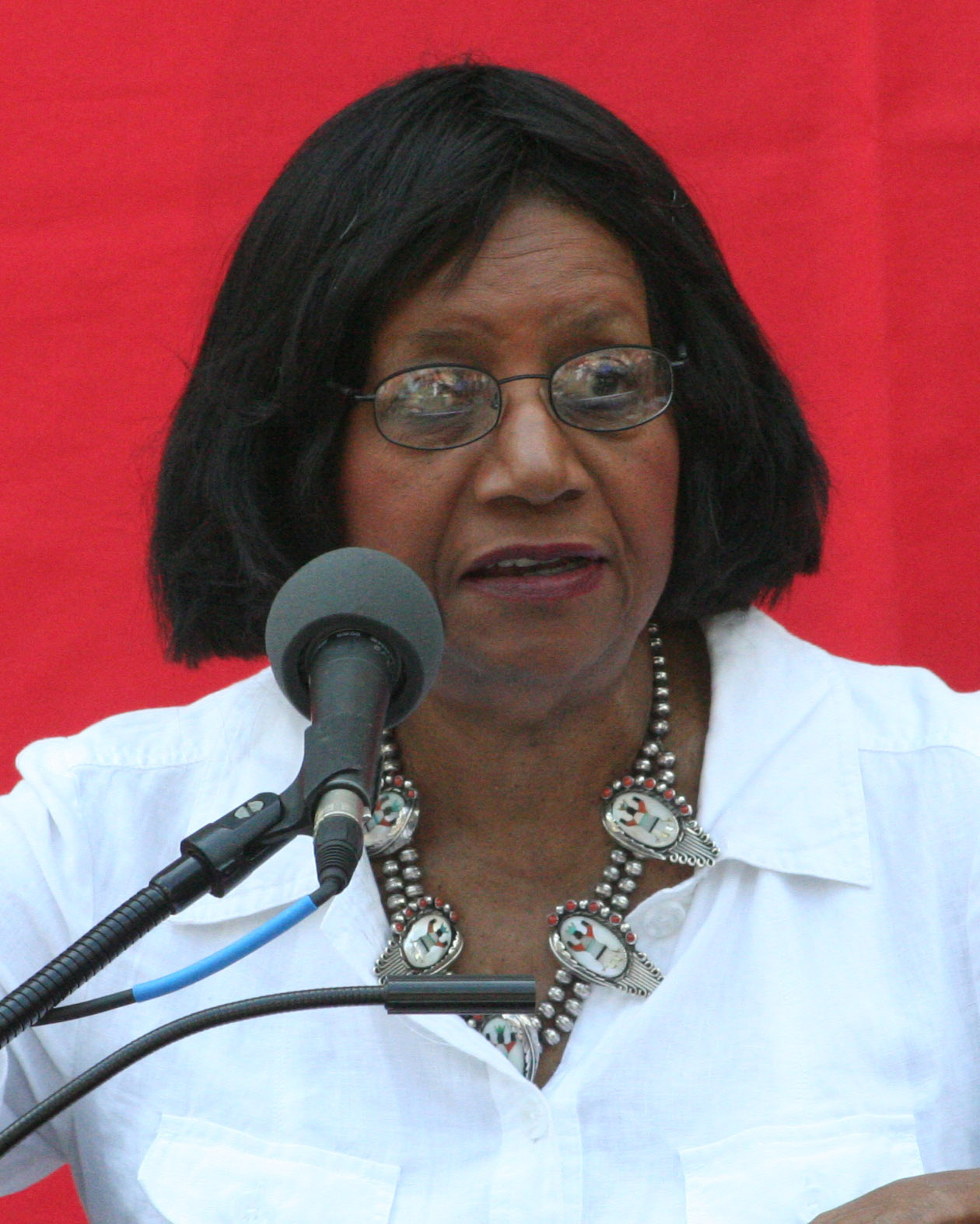
- Born: September 7, 1927; Washington, D.C.
- Died: November 7, 2017 (aged 90); Washington, D.C.
- Occupations: Teacher; poet
- Writing career
- Genre: Poetry
- Notable work: The Women of Plums: Poems in the Voices of Slave Women
- Notable awards: Poet Laureate of the District of Columbia

Dolores Kendrick (September 7, 1927 – November 7, 2017) was an American poet, and served as the second Poet Laureate of the District of Columbia. Her book The Women of Plums: Poems in the Voices of Slave Women won the Anisfield-Wolf Award.

== Biography ==
Dolores Teresa Kendrick was born on September 7, 1927, in Washington, DC. to parents Josephine, a musician and teacher, and Robert "Ike", founder and publisher of the Capitol Spotlight. She grew up in the LeDroit Park neighborhood near Howard University. She attended Dunbar High School where she began writing poetry, and went on to Miners Teachers College to study English, earning a bachelor's degree in 1949. She earned a master's degree in linguistics from Georgetown University in 1970 as part of the Experienced Teacher Fellowship Program. She designed the humanities curriculum for D.C.'s School Without Walls, where she was a co-founder. In 1963 she received a Fulbright Teacher Exchange to go to Belfast, Northern Ireland.

She published her first book of poetry, Through the Ceiling, in 1975, followed by Now Is the Thing to Praise (1984). Kendrick was a Vira I. Heinz professor emerita at Phillips Exeter Academy. She adapted The Women of Plums for the theater, which won the 1997 New York New Playwrights Award. Then she further adapted it into a digital cd, The Color of Dusk, with Wall Matthews and Aleta Greene.

Kendrick died at her Washington, D.C. home on November 7, 2017, aged 90, from complications of cancer.

== Works ==
- Through the Ceiling, Paul Breman Limited, 1975
- Now Is the Thing to Praise, Lotus Press, 1984, ISBN 978-0-916418-54-0
- The Women of Plums: Poems in the Voices of Slave Women, Phillips Exeter Academy Press, 1990, ISBN 978-0-939618-08-8
- Why the Woman Is Singing on the Corner: A Verse Narrative, Peter E. Randall Publisher, 2001, ISBN 978-1-931807-00-5

== Awards and honors ==
- 1963: Fulbright Teacher Exchange Program, Belfast, Northern Ireland
- 1965: Deep South Writers' Award for narrative poem "Freddie"
- 1967: Visiting master, 'Iolani School, Honolulu, Hawai'i
- 1981: Poet-in-residence at Holy Cross College, Worcester, Massachusetts
- 1988: Creative Writing Fellowship, National Endowment for the Arts
- 1990: Anisfield-Wolf Book award for The Women of Plums
- 1997: New York New Playwrights award for her stage adaptation of The Women of Plums
- 1999: Named Poet Laureate of the District of Columbia
- 2005: Inducted into the Washington, D.C. Hall of Fame in the cultural arts category
