= Roland Jefferson =

American botanist (1923–2020)

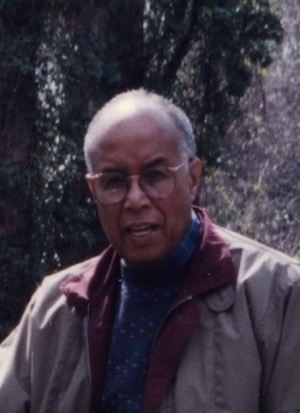
- Jefferson in 1995
- Born: Roland Maurice Jefferson; September 3, 1923; Washington, D.C., U.S.
- Died: November 27, 2020 (aged 97)
- Education: Howard University (BS)
- Known for: Blossoming cherry trees
- Scientific career
- Fields: Botany (pomology, dendrology)
- Workplaces: U.S. National Arboretum

Roland Maurice Jefferson (September 3, 1923 – November 27, 2020) was an American botanist who was the first African-American botanist to be employed by the United States National Arboretum, where he worked from 1956 to 1987. According to The Washington Post, he became an "international authority" on flowering cherry trees, coauthoring a 1977 book on how Washington, D.C., obtained its famous cherry trees.

== Early life and education ==
Born as an only child in Washington, D.C. to parents Edward Wilson Jefferson and Bernice Cornelia Bond, Jefferson attended Dunbar High School, served stateside as a US Army airman during World War II, and went to college on the GI Bill, earning his Bachelor of Science degree in botany from Howard University in 1950. However, he struggled to find work that utilized his professional skills, at one point entertaining dental school. He got a job at the US National Arboretum making informational plant labels in 1956. He quickly devised a new method for labeling plants, replacing the Arboretum's fast-deteriorating plastic labels with metal ones. He was promoted to botanist (the first African American to achieve this status at the US National Arboretum) in 1957.

== Scientific career ==
Cherry blossoms, Washington, D.C.

Jefferson was an expert on crab apple trees, publishing a book on the subject in 1970. In 1972, he began to conduct historical and scientific research on the Japanese blossoming cherry trees planted in the District of Columbia's West Potomac Park in the early twentieth century. He compiled twelve boxes of research materials and with historian Alan Fusonie wrote a "definitive history" entitled The Japanese Flowering Cherry Trees of Washington D.C.: A Living Symbol of Friendship (1977).

First Lady Helen Taft had planted ninety of these cherry trees in 1909, and Tokyo mayor Yukio Ozaki gifted another 1,800 Japanese cherry trees to the United States in 1912, as a gesture of friendship from Japan. Seeing the original cherry trees in decline, Jefferson took cuttings and propagated over one hundred trees between 1976 and 1979, playing a key role in the preservation of DC's famous cherries. In 1981, First Lady Nancy Reagan presented one of his trees to Japan, where Tokyo governor Shunichi Suzuki named it the President Reagan Cherry Tree. Tokyo planted 1,200 of Jefferson's cherry tree cuttings at the city's Toneri Park.

In 1982, Jefferson launched an international seed exchange program, recruiting Japanese schoolchildren to collect half a million Japanese cherry seeds and in return sending American dogwood seeds to Japan. He traveled to Europe, Japan, Korea, and Taiwan to collect specimens and seeds, whose cultivation grew the genetic diversity and resilience of American cherry trees.

In 1984, in response to an appeal for hardier cherry trees, Jefferson sent twenty-four seedlings he grew from cherry seeds collected in Hokkaido to the Japanese Garden at Normandale Community College in Bloomington, Minnesota. One of the few that can withstand frigid temperatures, this varietal is now grown nationwide.

In the early 1980s, Jefferson and research assistant Kay Kazue Wain reorganized flowering cherries into botanical groupings called Yama-zakura (wild "mountain cherries") and Sato-zakura (cultivated "village cherries"), adopting romanized Japanese nomenclature instead of Latin names. Their work was published in 1984.

In the 1990s, Jefferson donated his personal papers to the National Arboretum's library and archives. Additional donations followed in 2006.

== Personal life ==
Jefferson retired in 1987. He lived in Japan from 1987 to 1998. He was recorded as living in Seattle, Washington, as of 1999 and in Honolulu, Hawaii, as of 2012.

He met Keiko Ishisaki while on a plant collecting trip to Japan and married her in 1983. She died in Honolulu on September 11, 2014, at the age of 81.

== Publications ==
- Jefferson, Roland M.; Wain, Kay Kazue (1984). The Nomenclature of Cultivated Japanese Flowering Cherries (Prunus): The Sato-zakura Group. National Arboretum Contribution No. 5. Washington, D.C.: Agricultural Research Service, U.S. Department of Agriculture. OCLC 1049879828.
- Jefferson, Roland M.; Fusonie, Alan M. (1977). The Japanese Flowering Cherry Trees of Washington, D.C.: A Living Symbol of Friendship. National Arboretum Contribution No. 4. Washington, D.C.: Agricultural Research Service, U.S. Department of Agriculture. OCLC 4777225. Archived from the original on June 3, 2012.
- Jefferson, Roland M. (1970). History, Progeny, and Locations of Crabapples of Documented Authentic Origin. National Arboretum Contribution No. 2. Washington, D.C.: Agricultural Research Service, U.S. Department of Agriculture. OCLC 1046587765.
