= Rudolph V. Tolbert =

American community activist (1938–2020)

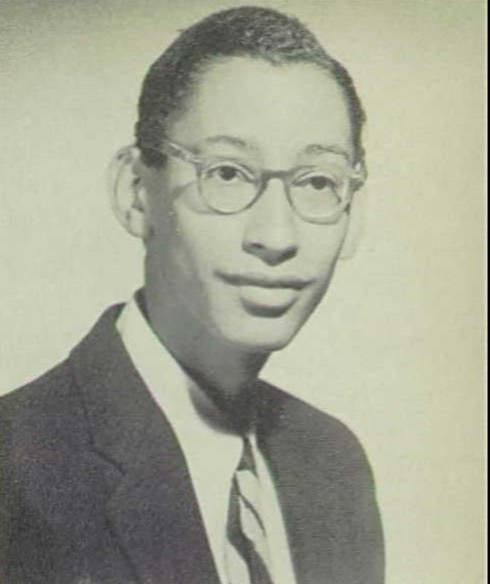
- Tolbert in 1955
- Born: October 14, 1938; Harrisburg, Pennsylvania, US
- Died: January 15, 2020 (aged 81); Philadelphia, Pennsylvania, US
- Other name: Juhudi Mshale ya Kazana
- Education: Dunbar High School (DC)
- Occupation: Community activist
- Spouse(s): Clara (divorced); Ahada Stanford (divorced); Sonja "Sunni" Green
- Children: 4

Rudolph V. Tolbert was a community activist who fought against housing discrimination in Philadelphia.

== Background ==
Rudolph V. Tolbert was born on October 14, 1938, in Harrisburg, Pennsylvania. While a student at Dunbar High School, he was vice president of the physics club, a member of the track team, and participated in reserve officer training.

After high school, he spent three years as a White House page. Between 1962 and 1965 he served in the military in Vietnam War where he became decorated as a sharpshooter.

== Career ==
According to his family, Tolbert used his experience in the military and White House to develop diplomatic skills that served him well in his civilian life. This includes his stint as the first black member of Boeing's electronics quality control division in the mid-1960s and early 1970s.

From there Tolbert transitioned to his role as a community activist, where he fought tirelessly against housing discrimination. He founded the nonprofit Northwest Tenants Organization, which was one of the first groups to use community organizing, and other means to help black people secure housing in Philadelphia's Germantown and Mount Airy neighborhoods.

== Death ==
Tolbert died of respiratory failure on January 15, 2020, at the Chestnut Hill Hospital in Philadelphia.
