= Enid Cook de Rodaniche =

American virologist and bacteriologist

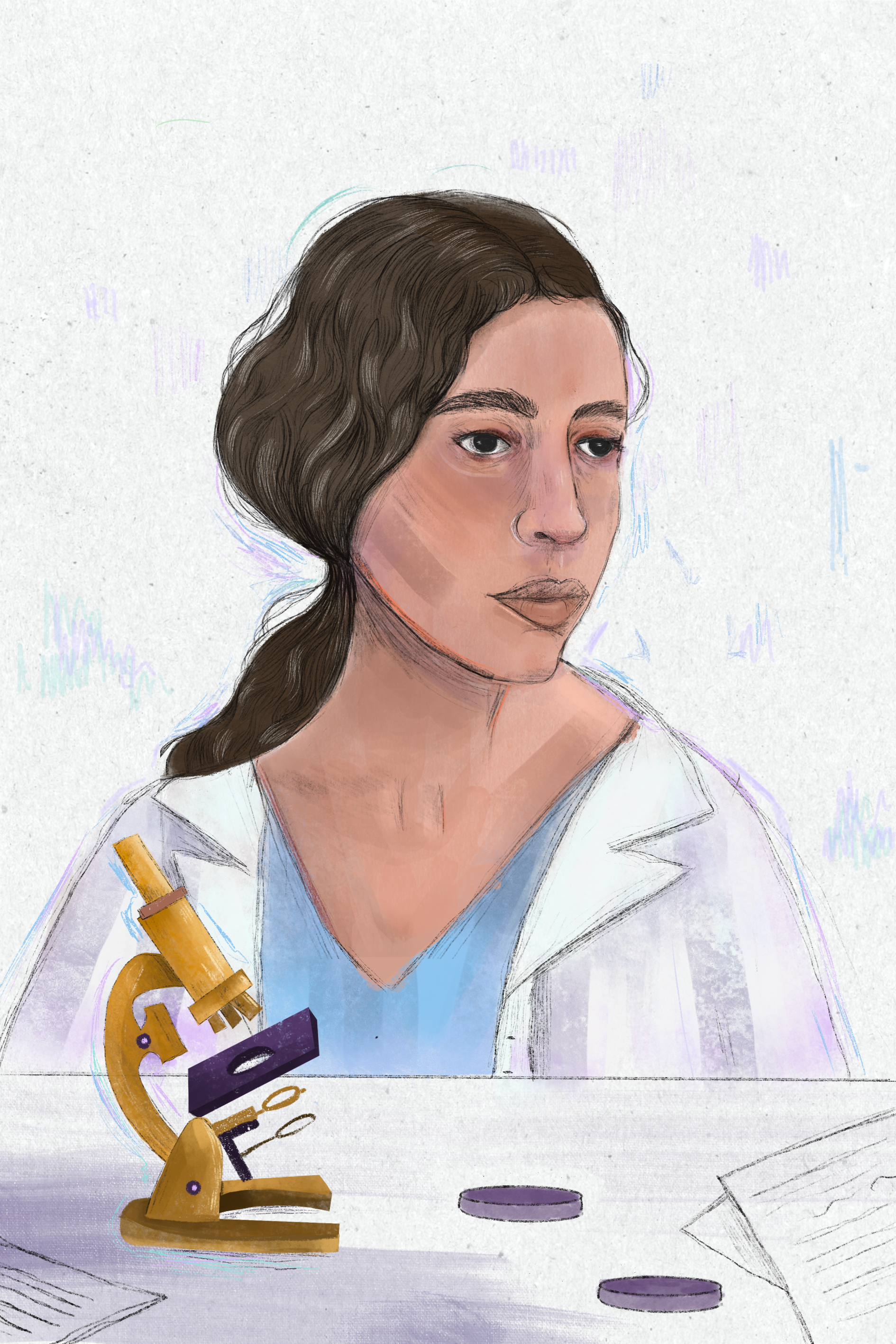
Illustration of Enid Cook de Rodaniche

Enid Cook de Rodaniche (1906–1980s) was an American virologist and bacteriologist. She was the Chief of the Public Health Laboratory at the Instituto Conmemorativo Gorgas in Panama City, Panama where she was the first person to isolate the yellow fever virus in Panama, and, along with her physician husband Arcadio Rodaniche, identified and characterized the viral strain responsible for an outbreak of polio in Panama in 1950–51. She was on the founding faculty of the University of Panama School of Medicine. She was the first Black student to graduate from Bryn Mawr College, majoring in chemistry and biology. The Enid Cook '31 Center at Bryn Mawr College is named for her, and the Dr. Enid Cook de Rodaniche Medal is awarded by the Rotary Club of Panama for work in virology.

== Education ==
Enid Cook graduated from Dunbar High School in Washington, DC. She attended Howard University, then transferred in 1927 to Bryn Mawr College. She graduated from Bryn Mawr in 1931, she was the first Black student to graduate from this Seven Sister school. She earned her Ph.D. in virology at the University of Chicago in 1937. Her thesis was titled "Studies on the Virus of St. Louis Encephalitis."

Cook's admission to Bryn Mawr was a subject of intense debate among the faculty and administration of the college, and was particularly opposed by the first president of the college, M. Carey Thomas. Though Thomas was no longer president of the college at the time, she retained a position on the board of trustees, and attempted to use that position to prevent Cook's admission. Thomas had refused to allow any Black students to attend Bryn Mawr while she was president, going so far as to personally raise money to pay for another Black student, Jessie Redmon Fauset, to go to Cornell instead of Bryn Mawr in 1903. When Cook was finally admitted to Bryn Mawr, she was denied access to the dorms on-campus and was obliged to live off-campus in the home of a professor instead. Black students would not be residential students at Bryn Mawr until 1946.

== Career and Research ==
After earning her Ph.D. in virology from University of Chicago in 1937, she was a lecturer there from 1937 to 1944. During her time at the university she published a number of journal articles on her research into St. Louis encephalitis and on herpes. Beginning in 1946, she was the chief of the Public Health Laboratory at the Instituto Conmemorativo Gorgas in Panama City, Panama where her work centered on viral diseases and rickettsias. She was a founding member of the faculty at the School of Medicine of the University of Panama and its first professor of parasitology and microbiology. She published more than 30 papers over the course of her career. Her work explored a wide variety of rickettsioses, including Rocky Mountain spotted fever and typhus, as well as viral diseases such as polio and yellow fever. Her research in parasitology included work on toxoplasmosis, giardia and malaria.

== Personal life ==
Enid Cook was born in 1906 in the District of Columbia. She graduated from Dunbar High School. She married Arcadio Rodaniche, a Panamanian physician, in 1944, after which she moved to Panama City. She died in Panama in the late 1980s.
