= Dunbar High School (Washington, D.C.) =

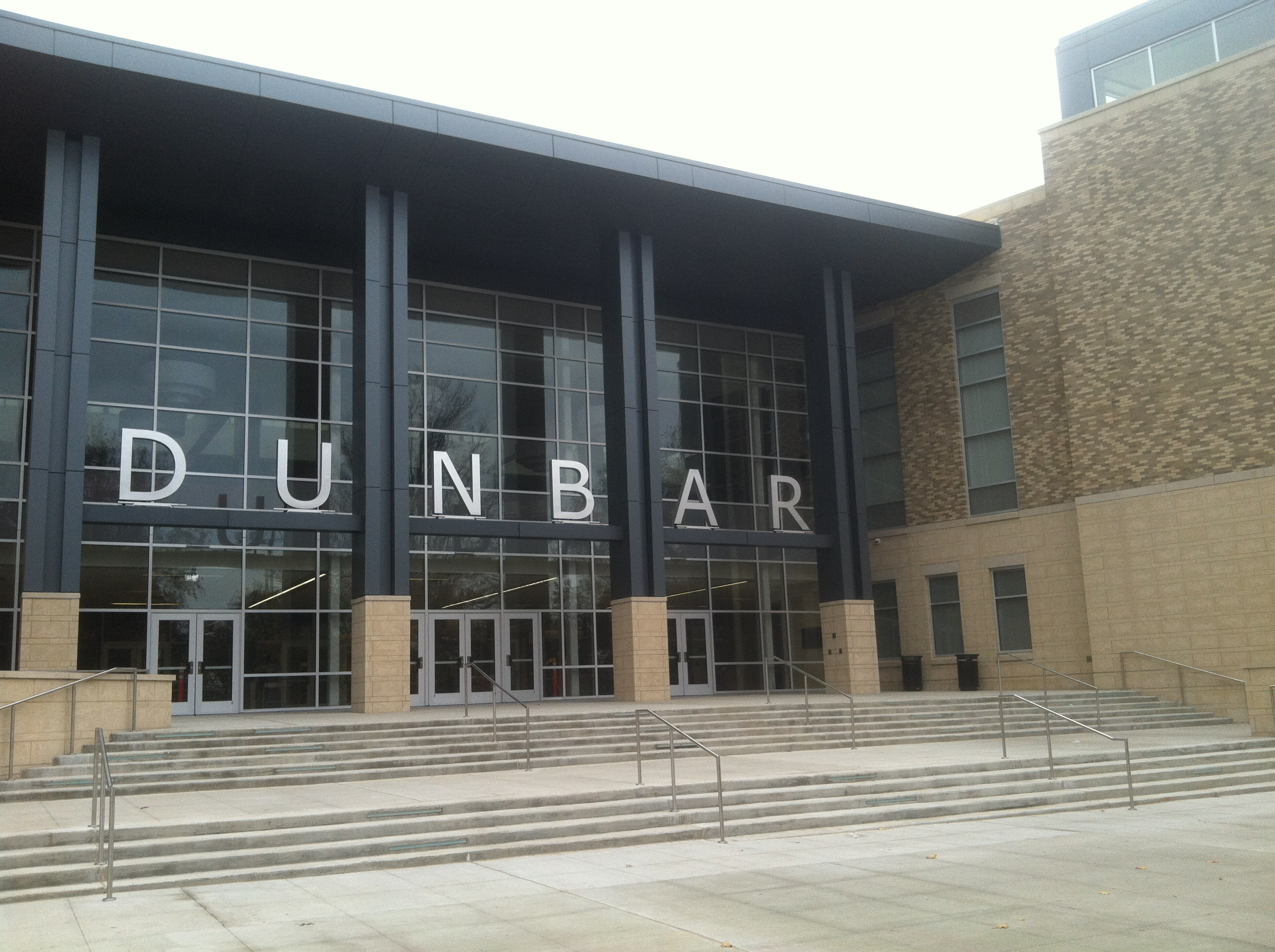

Location
- 101 N Street NW; Washington, D.C. 20001; United States; 38°54′31″N 77°00′51″W

Information
- Former name: Preparatory High School for Colored Youth
- School type: Public high school
- Established: 1870 (156 years ago)
- Status: Open
- School board: District of Columbia State Board of Education
- School district: District of Columbia Public Schools
- NCES District ID: 1100030
- School code: DC-001-467
- CEEB code: 090055
- NCES School ID: 110003000079
- Principal: Nadine Smith
- Faculty: 42 (on an FTE basis)
- Grades: 9 to 12
- Enrollment: 666 (2020–2021)
  - Grade 9: 222
  - Grade 10: 173
  - Grade 11: 115
  - Grade 12: 156
- Student to teacher ratio: 15.86
- Campus type: Urban
- Colors: Black and crimson
- Athletics conference: DCIAA
- Nickname: Crimson Tide
- USNWR ranking: 13,394–17,857
- Communities served: Ward 5
- Website: www.dunbarhsdc.org

Paul Laurence Dunbar High School is a historically Black public high school in Washington, D.C. Founded in 1870, it was America's first public high school for Black students and is today part of the District of Columbia Public Schools.

The school is in the Truxton Circle neighborhood of Northwest Washington, two blocks from the intersection of New Jersey and New York avenues.

From the early 20th century to the 1950s, Dunbar became known as the classical academic high school for Black students in segregated public schools. As public school teachers were federal civil servants, the school's teachers received pay equal to white teachers in other schools in the district. It attracted high-quality faculty, many with advanced degrees, including doctorates. Parents sent their children to the school from across the city because of its high standards. Many of its alumni graduated from top-quality colleges and universities and gained professional degrees. An early principal was Mary Jane Patterson.

== History ==
The school was founded in 1870 as the Preparatory High School for Colored Youth, America's first public high school for Black students. The school was started at the Fifteenth Street Presbyterian Church by William Syphax, president of the Board of Trustees for Colored Schools. From 1891 to 1916, it was known as M Street High School. When its location was changed from M Street, the school was renamed in 1916 for the noted African-American poet, Paul Laurence Dunbar, who died in 1906.

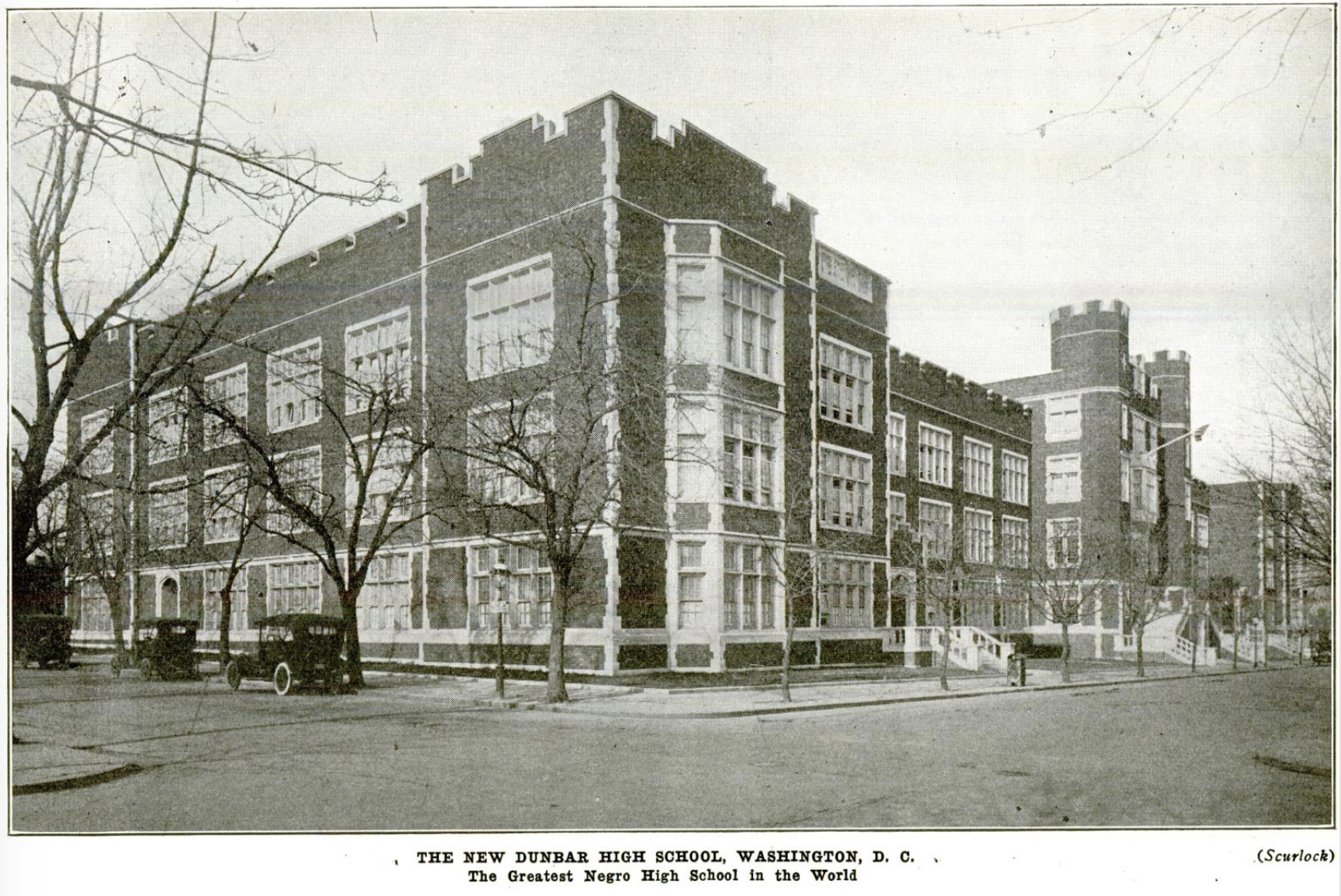
Dunbar High School in 1917

As the city established other high schools, it designated Dunbar as its academic high school, with other schools providing more vocational or technical training. Dunbar was known for its excellent academics; some Black parents moved to Washington so their children could attend it. All the public school teachers were federal employees, and Dunbar's faculty was paid well by the standards of the time, earning parity pay with Washington's white school teachers. The school boasted many graduates who went on to higher education and a generally successful student body.

Dunbar's original 1916 building, designed by architect Snowden Ashford, was demolished in 1977 and subsequently rebuilt; the resulting building was in turn demolished and rebuilt in 2013.

One of Dunbar's first principals was the first Black graduate of Harvard College. Almost all the teachers had graduate degrees, and several earned PhDs. By the 1950s, Dunbar High School sent 80 percent of its students to college.

Until 1954, Fairfax County, Virginia, had no secondary schools for Black students. Dunbar and several other District of Columbia public schools accepted Black students from the county before that time.

Economist Thomas Sowell wrote in 2015 that this all changed after Brown v. Board of Education, the landmark United States Supreme Court case that ruled for integration of public schools:

"For Washington, the end of racial segregation led to a political compromise, in which all schools became neighborhood schools. Dunbar, which had been accepting outstanding Black students from anywhere in the city, could now accept only students from the rough ghetto neighborhood in which it was located. Virtually overnight, Dunbar became a typical ghetto school. As unmotivated, unruly and disruptive students flooded in, Dunbar teachers began moving out and many retired. More than 80 years of academic excellence simply vanished into thin air."

The school's alumni include James E. Bowman, Sterling Brown, Nannie Helen Burroughs, Paul Capel III, Benjamin O. Davis Sr., Charles R. Drew, H. Naylor Fitzhugh, William H. Hastie, Charles Hamilton Houston, Robert Heberton Terrell, Jean Toomer and Robert C. Weaver. Its faculty included A. A. Birch Jr., Julia Evangeline Brooks, who was also a graduate of the school, Anna Julia Cooper, Kelly Miller, and Mary Church Terrell. Cooper was also an early principal, as were Richard Greener, Mary Jane Patterson, and Robert Terrell. An unusual number of teachers and principals held Ph.D. degrees, including historian Carter G. Woodson, the second African American to earn a PhD from Harvard (after W. E. B. Du Bois) and the father of Black History Month.

In the 21st century, Dunbar is similar to Paul Laurence Dunbar High School in Baltimore, Maryland, and Fort Worth, Texas, as all three schools have a majority African-American student body and are of major importance to the local African-American community. All three schools are also highly regarded for their athletic programs within their respective school district in football, basketball, and track. There is also a Paul Laurence Dunbar High School in Lexington, Kentucky.

== Admissions ==
Chinatown is among the areas in the school's attendance area.

== Student body ==
Dunbar has about 650 students.

- 98% are African American
- 1% are Hispanic American
- Less than 1% are Asian American
- Less than 1% are Native American
- Less than 1% are European American

About 46% of students qualified for free or reduced lunch.

Enrollment by Race/Ethnicity 2020–2021
Black	Hispanic	Two or More Races	Native Hawaiian/ Pacific Islander
635	26	3	1

=== Feeder patterns ===
Feeder elementary schools include:

- J. F. Cook
- Emery
- Langdon
- Terrel
- Webb
- Wheatley
- Young

Feeder middle schools include:

- Browne

Feeder K-8 schools include:

- Walker-Jones Education Center

== Notable alumni ==
=== Artists and entertainers ===
- Ernest Anderson, actor
- Elizabeth Catlett, a prominent sculptor and artist
- George Faison, a Tony and Emmy Award-winning choreographer, dancer and producer
- Rex Goreleigh, painter, arts educator
- May Miller, playwright
- Billy Taylor, jazz pianist
- George Walker (composer), first African American to win the Pulitzer Prize for Music
- Vantile Whitfield, influential arts administrator and theater director

=== Athletes ===
- Arrelious Benn, NFL wide receiver for the Jacksonville Jaguars
- Nate Bussey, NFL linebacker in the NFL and CFL
- Josh Cribbs, NFL player
- Vernon Davis, NFL tight end for the Washington Redskins
- Vontae Davis, retired NFL cornerback who played for the Miami Dolphins, Indianapolis Colts, and Buffalo Bills
- John Duren (1976), NBA player and 19th overall pick in the 1980 NBA Draft by the Utah Jazz
- Cornelius Greene, All-American and first African American quarterback to start at Ohio State University
- Anthony Jones (1981), former basketball player for Georgetown Univ and UNLV. Jones was selected in the first round by the Washington Bullets in the 1986 NBA Draft. Also played for the Spurs, Bulls, and Mavericks
- Wil Jones, a record-setting basketball player at American University and head basketball coach of University of the District of Columbia National Champions, Division II, 1982.
- Tre Kelley, former basketball player for the University of South Carolina
- Bernard Robinson, retired NBA player
- Craig Shelton (1976), retired NBA player
- Michael Smith (1990), NBA Smith was selected by the Sacramento Kings in the second round of the 1994 NBA draft. He played for the Kings, Vancouver Grizzlies, and Washington Wizards.

=== Government ===
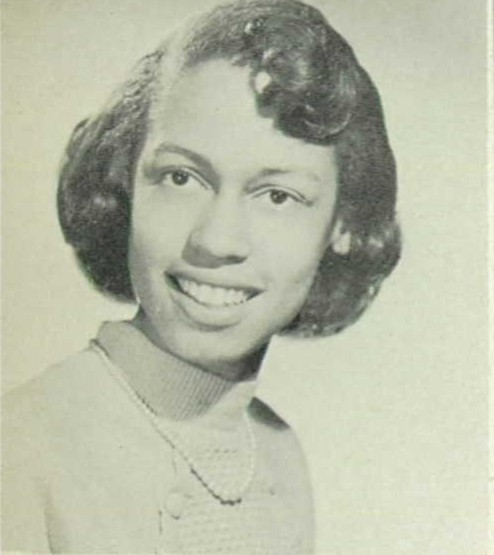
Eleanor Holmes Norton in 1955 yearbook

- Wesley A. Brown, first African-American graduate of the US Naval Academy
- Frederic E. Davison, first African-American major general in the army
- Edward Brooke, first African American to be elected by popular vote to the United States Senate
- Lawrence Chambers, first African-American graduate of the U.S. Naval Academy to reach the rank of admiral
- Walter Fauntroy, first delegate to the U.S. House of Representatives from the District of Columbia's at-large congressional district
- Vincent C. Gray, former chairman of the Council of the District of Columbia and mayor of Washington D.C.
- Floretta Dukes McKenzie (1952), Superintendent of D.C. Public Schools
- Eleanor Holmes Norton (1955), Delegate to Congress
- Clarence M. Pendleton Jr., chairman of the United States Commission on Civil Rights from 1981 until his death in 1988
- Inez Smith Reid, judge of the District of Columbia Court of Appeals
- Antoinette Scott, nurse and soldier who is the first female from Washington, D.C., to receive the Purple Heart. DC
- Annice M. Wagner, judge of the District of Columbia Court of Appeals
- Mary Burke Washington (1944), economist and government official

=== Scholars and professionals ===
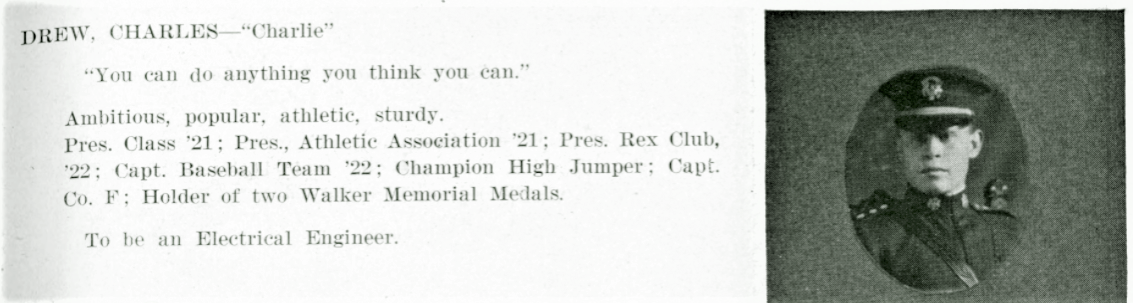
Charles Drew in 1922 yearbook.

- James E. Bowman, scientist, physician, pathologist, studied G6PD and Sickle cell disease
- Sterling Allen Brown, professor, poet
- Alice Pollard Clark, first African American woman to serve as district judge for Howard County, Maryland
- William Montague Cobb, physical anthropologist, anatomist, and educator. The first African-American Ph.D. in anthropology, He was also the first African-American President of the National Association for the Advancement of Colored People
- Oscar James Cooper, co-founder of Omega Psi Phi Fraternity Inc.
- Allison Davis (1920), anthropologist, educator, scholar; first African American to hold full faculty position at a major white institution, namely, University of Chicago
- John Aubrey Davis Sr. Civil rights activist, head academic researcher on Brown v. The Board of Education, New Negro Alliance co-founder and political science professor
- Enid Cook de Rodaniche, virologist and bacteriologist. She was the Chief of the Public Health Laboratory at the Instituto Conmemorativo Gorgas in Panama City, Panama.
- Charles R. Drew (1922), discovered blood plasma and was the first black surgeon to serve as an examiner on the American Board of Surgery
- H. Naylor Fitzhugh, credited with creating the concept of target marketing
- Evelyn Boyd Granville, second African-American woman to receive a Ph.D. in mathematics from an American university
- Edna Burke Jackson, first African American woman to teach at Woodrow Wilson High School
- Roland Jefferson, first African American botanist employed by the United States National Arboretum
- Dolores Kendrick, second Poet Laureate of the District of Columbia
- Mary Kenner, inventor; holder of the largest number of patents awarded to a black woman
- Colbert I. King, Pulitzer Prize-winning The Washington Post columnist
- Yvonne Seon, professor and Unitarian Universalist minister.

=== Criminals ===
- Rayful Edmond, drug kingpin

== Notable faculty ==
- Jane Eleanor Datcher, first African American woman to earn an advanced degree from Cornell University
- Vernon Davis, former National Football League tight end for the San Francisco 49ers, Denver Broncos, and Washington Redskins
- G. David Houston, former professor of English at Howard University
- Ernest Everett Just, zoologist and honorary founder of Omega Psi Phi fraternity
- Mary Jane Patterson, first African American woman to receive a BA degree
- Carter G. Woodson, father of Negro History Week, later Black History Month
