= Antoinette Scott =

American nurse and soldier (born 1970)

Antoinette V. Scott
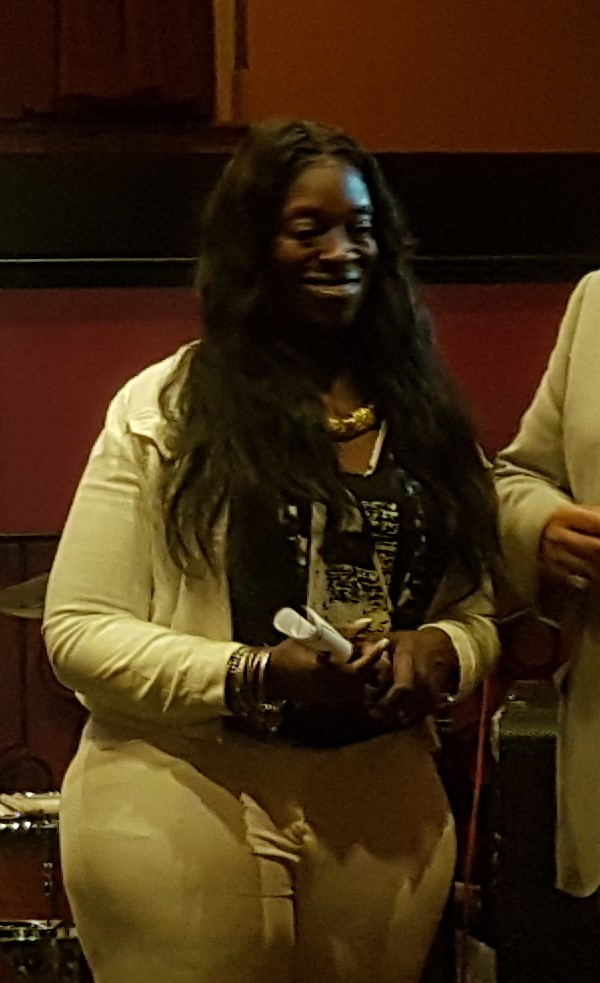
- Scott speaking for DC Statehood, 2019
- Born: Antoinette Scott; March 5, 1970 (age 55)
- Education: Dunbar High School
- Occupations: nurse, financial analyst, activist

Antoinette V. Scott (born March 5, 1970) is an American nurse and soldier who is the first female resident of the District of Columbia to receive a Purple Heart. She earned the award for her service during Operation Iraqi Freedom, where she drove her team to safety after she was wounded in an attack by an improvised explosive device. She is an activist for DC Statehood.

== Early life and education ==
Scott was born at Walter Reed Army Medical Center and attended Dunbar High School. After high school, she pursued a nursing career, first training at a vocational school and graduating among the top in her class.

== Career ==
Scott worked at DC General Hospital for 12 years. In 1996, she enlisted in the DC Army National Guard. She was deployed to Iraq in 2003 as part of Operation Iraqi Freedom. After leaving service, Scott works as a financial analyst.

== Service ==
On November 14, 2003, Scott was serving in the 547th Transportation Unit and responsible for moving eight fellow soldiers to Baghdad International Airport. While driving a five-ton vehicle, an improvised explosive device exploded and damaged the vehicle and wounded Scott. She suffered wounds to her face by shrapnel, broke her jaw and main cerebral blood vessel. Despite the attack and her injuries, she kept the vehicle moving and brought her fellow servicemen to safety before she received any medical attention for the traumatic brain injury she suffered. She severed the main blood vessel to her brain, for which she received 59 stitches.

On March 30, 2016, the D.C. Council passed the Antoinette Scott Recognition Resolution of 2016 recognizing Scott for her service. She is an activist for D.C. Statehood and outspoken about how she has no Congressional representation despite her military service.

== Personal life ==
Scott is a mother of four daughters and married to her husband Donahue Scott.
