= Lillian Lincoln =

American business woman

Lillian Lincoln Lambert is an American businesswoman, and the first African-American woman to graduate from Harvard Business School (HBS), where she was one of the co-founders of the African-American Student Union. She graduated in 1969 and received the W. E. B. Du Bois award. After holding down a number of different jobs she started her own building services company, Centennial One, in 1976. After she sold that, she engaged in public speaking and published a memoir.

== Biography ==
=== Early life and education ===
Lambert grew up in Ballsville, Virginia, fifty miles west of Richmond. She was the daughter of a teacher and a farmer and was raised on a Powhatan County farm. Growing up, she did chores in the fields, but "had a thirst for knowledge" and read in her spare time. "Intent on making her mark in a big city" she went to New York after high school but the only work she found was as a maid. After three years in New York, she moved to Washington, D.C., found work in government typing pools and attended teachers' college part-time. At age 22, she transferred to Howard University and studied business. She graduated in 1966. While at Howard, she met H. Naylor Fitzhugh, one of the first blacks to attend Harvard Business School (MBA in 1933). Lambert worked as Fitzhugh's research assistant at Howard and Fitzhugh became her mentor. He persuaded her to apply to HBS.

In the fall of 1967, Lambert registered for Harvard Business School, not realizing until she arrived that she was the only black woman at HBS: of the 800 students in her class, only 6 were black and 18 female. During her first year, Lambert and four black classmates -- A. Leroy Willis, Clifford E. Darden, Theodore Lewis and George Robert Price—talked about the need to increase the number of blacks at the school, and they started the HBS African-American Student Union (AASU). Dean George P. Baker supported the group and approached corporations to raise additional scholarship money. Over the course of two years, AASU increased the number of African-American students sevenfold, increased financial aid for African-American students and provided career development opportunities.

=== Career ===
Before graduating in 1969, Lambert was not interviewed or recruited by a single company. She decided to return to her previous employer in D.C. - a management consulting company, Sterling. After the company closed its Washington office, she held various jobs, including stockbroker, management trainee, job-training consultant, and business professor at Bowie State. Then, a former colleague recommended her for a job as executive vice president of Unified Services, a building maintenance business. She says of the experience, "As his second-in-command I ran this guy's company for several years".

In 1976, she launched her own building services company, Centennial One, headquartered in Landover, Maryland. Starting with 20 part-time employees, $4,000 in savings, a $12,000 line of credit, and an office in her garage, she built Centennial One into a company that made over $20 million in revenues, 1200 employees and has operations in four states. The company offered a range of services from carpet cleaning to landscaping. Her roster of clients included ABC News, Dulles Airport, Hewlett-Packard, NationsBank, Northrop Grumman and Arthur D. Little. In 1995, she was the first woman to serve as president of an international association of building service contractors.

Lambert sold Centennial One in 2001 and began a successful speaking career, and wrote a book about her experiences, The Road to Someplace Better: From the Segregated South to Harvard Business School and Beyond (published by Wiley, 2010).

=== Honors ===
In 2003, Harvard Business School awarded Lambert the Alumni Achievement Award, the highest award bestowed on its alumni. The award recognizes recipients for "the contributions they made to their companies and communities, while upholding the highest standards and values in everything they do." In 2010, Lambert was inducted into Enterprise Women Magazine's Enterprising Women Hall of Fame. Lambert sits on the Board of Visitors at Virginia Commonwealth University and the Board of Directors for Harvard Business School African-American Alumni Association.

== See also ==
- List of African-American pioneers in desegregation of higher education
