= Alice Pollard Clark =

Pioneering African-American jurist (born 1940)

Alice Gail Pollard Clark
- Born: February 12, 1940; Washington, D.C.
- Education: Howard University (BS); Catholic University of America; University of Maryland School of Law (JD)
- Occupation: Judge
- Known for: The first African-American woman to serve as district judge for Howard County, Maryland

Alice Gail Pollard Clark (born February 12, 1940) is a retired American judge from Maryland. In 1997, she became the first African-American woman to serve as district judge for Howard County, Maryland.

== Biography ==
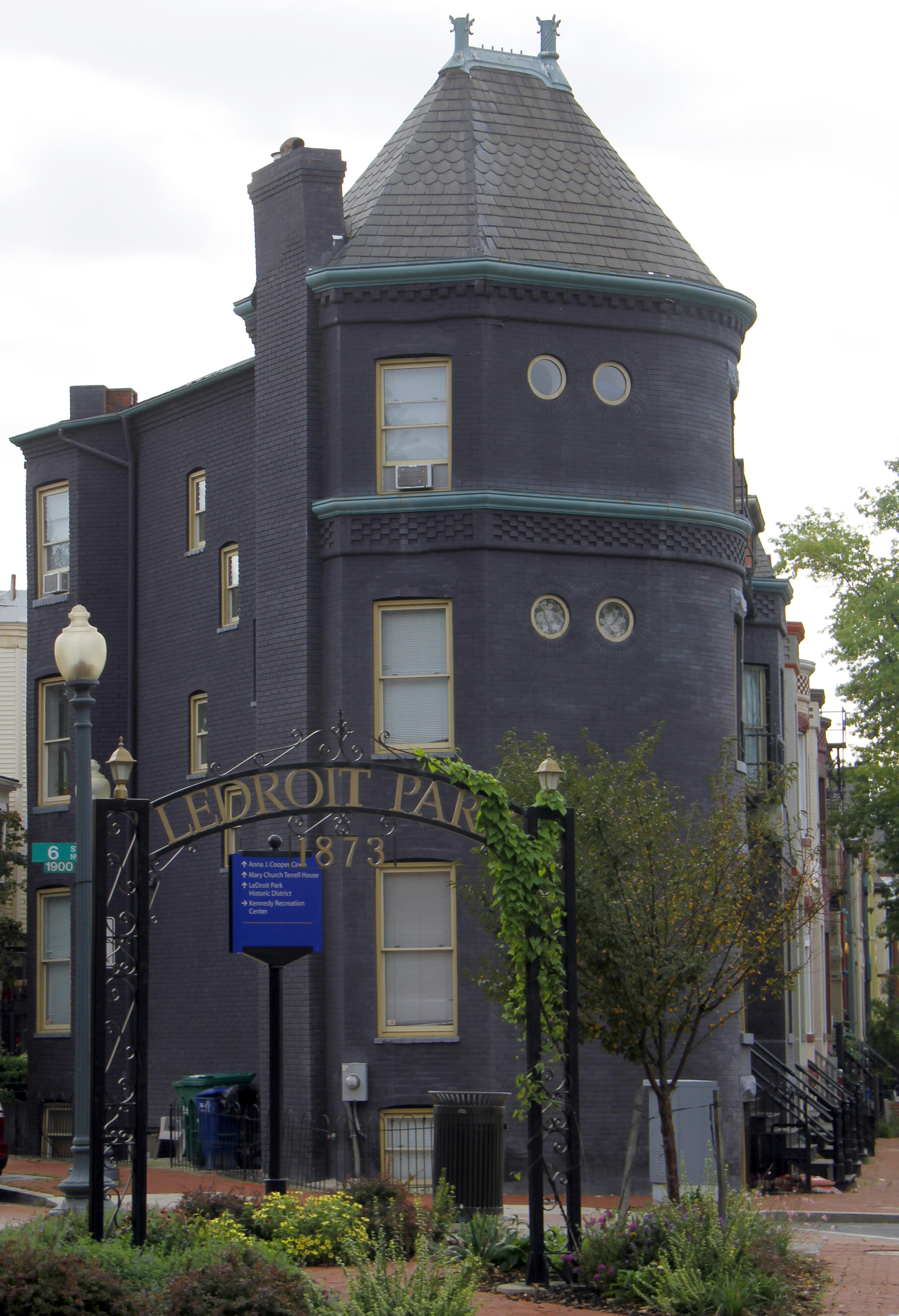
LeDroit Park, Washington DC

Alice Gail Pollard was born on February 12, 1940, in Washington, D.C. She grew up on Randolph Place in the LeDroit Park neighborhood of Northwest, Washington. The area would become notable as the home of four black women who eventually became pioneering jurists, one of them being Clark. Pollard graduated from Washington's Paul Lawrence Dunbar Senior High School before heading to university.

=== Educator ===
Clark attended Howard University and graduated with a bachelor's degree in Science in 1961. She went on to became a science teacher in the District of Columbia Public Schools system. In 1963, she received a Master's degree from Catholic University of America. After teaching for eight years, she became a guidance counselor. After spending nearly twenty years as an educator and counselor, she returned to university to attend law school in her late thirties. Clark graduated from the University of Maryland School of Law in 1982 and passed the bar exam the following year.

=== Legal career ===
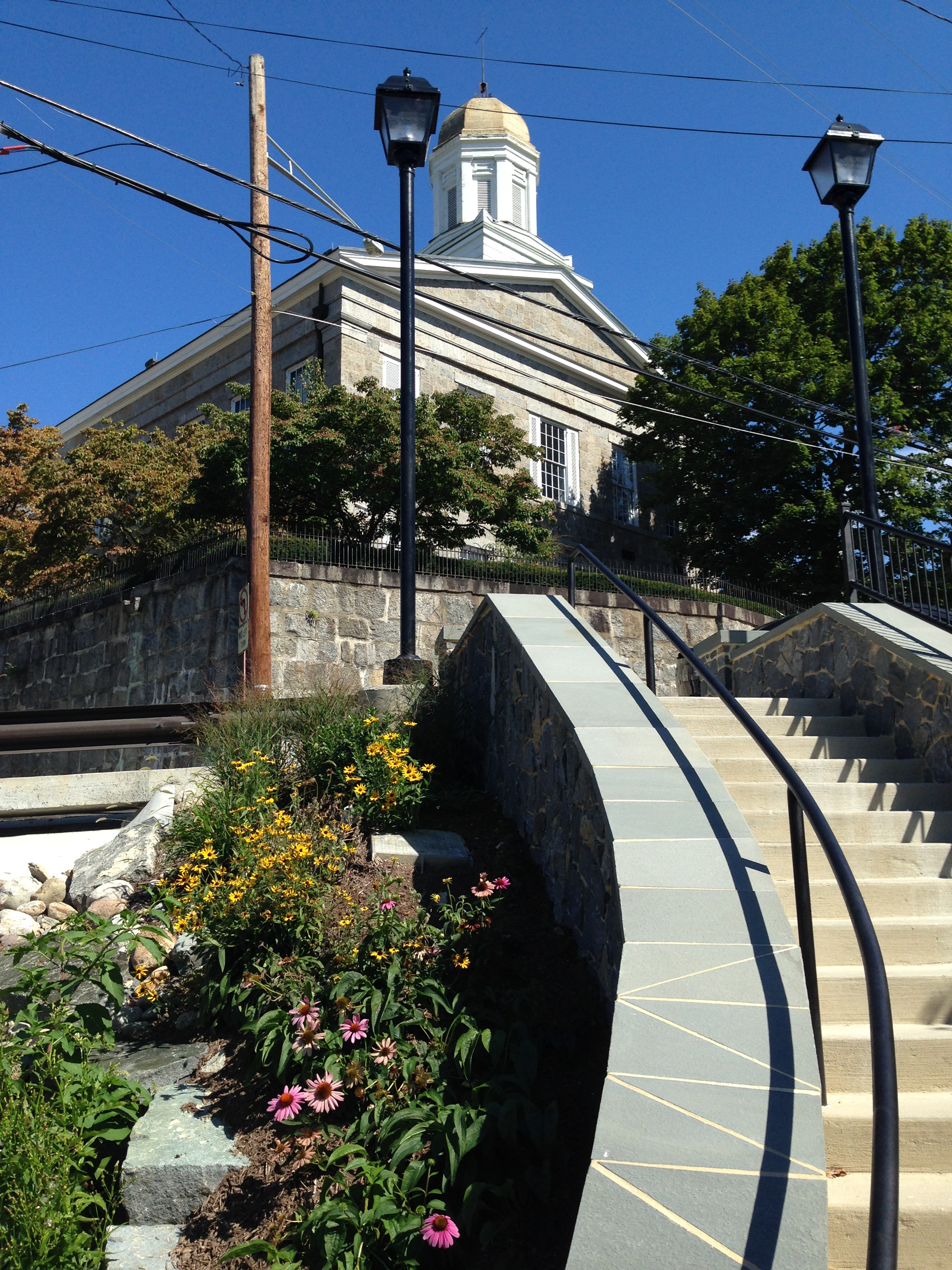
Howard County Courthouse, Elicott, Maryland

In 1990, she became the first black woman attorney in the Howard County office of the Public Defender. In 1995, she was appointed by Maryland Governor Parris N. Glendening to Howard County's circuit court. The following year, she was named Outstanding Assistant Public Defender of the Year for Howard and Carroll Counties.

In 1997, at the age of 57, she became the first African-American woman appointed to the district court bench in Howard County. Her appointment by Maryland Governor Parris N. Glendening filled the vacancy of former District Judge Lenore R. Gelfman. Clark continued to work with education and youth while a jurist.

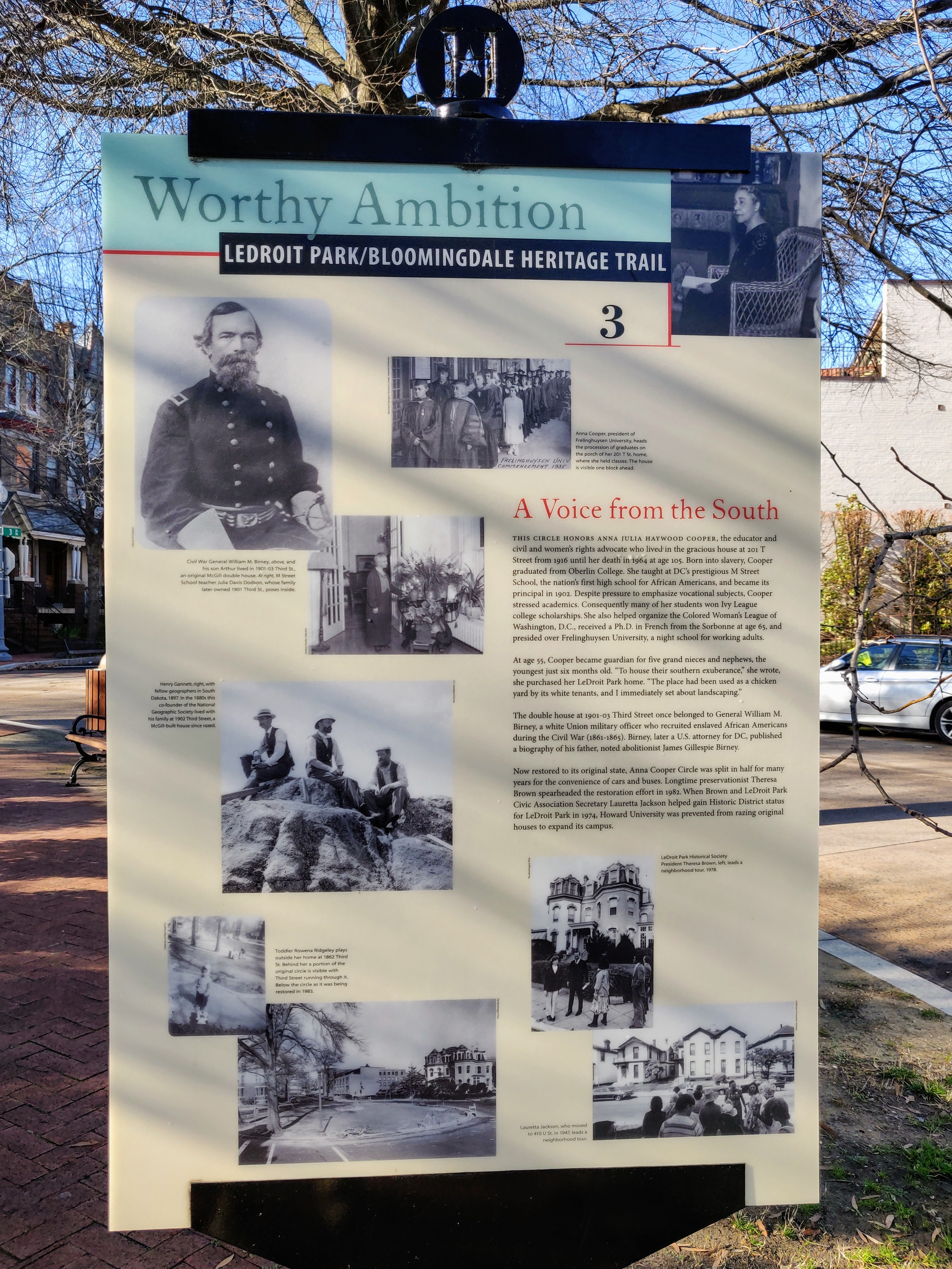
Heritage Trail marker

Clark retired from the bench on February 11, 2010, after reaching the age of 70, the county's mandatory retirement age.

=== Legacy ===
Today Clark's accomplishments are recognized on the LeDroit Park-Bloomingdale Heritage Trail in her hometown of NW Washington.
