= Georgia E. Oden =

American physician

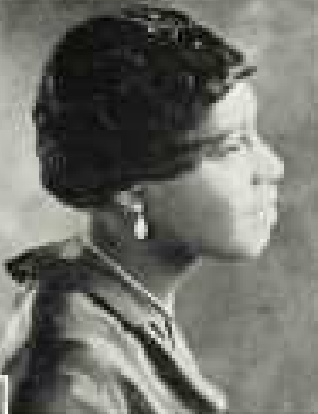
- Georgia E. Oden, from the 1929 yearbook of Howard University
- Born: Georgia Elizabeth Oden; April 6, 1909; Beaufort, North Carolina, U.S.
- Died: August 2, 1974 (age 65); Washington, D.C., U.S.
- Other name: Georgia Oden Stevens
- Occupation: Physician
- Relatives: Gloria Oden (sister)

Georgia Elizabeth Oden Stevens (April 6, 1909 – August 2, 1974) was an American physician. She practiced in Alabama, Pennsylvania, Chicago, and Washington, D.C., and was an instructor in obstetrics and gynecology at Howard University College of Medicine.

== Early life and education ==
Oden was born in Beaufort, North Carolina, and raised in New York, the eldest daughter of Redmond Stanley Oden and Ethel E. Kincaid Oden. Her father was pastor in the African Methodist Episcopal Zion Church denomination. Her maternal grandfather, G. W. Kincaid, was also a pastor. She graduated from Howard University in 1929, and stayed at Howard to earn her medical degree in 1932. At Howard, she was the first woman to qualify for membership in the Beta Kappa Chi honor society.

One of her younger sisters was poet Gloria Oden.

== Career ==
Oden completed her internship at Freedmen's Hospital in Washington, D.C., and passed her board exams in 1933. She practiced medicine in Mobile, Alabama, and Braddock, Pennsylvania. She served a residency in obstetrics and gynecology at Provident Hospital in Chicago from 1950 to 1952. She and her husband moved to Washington, D.C., in 1955. She taught obstetrics and gynecology at Howard University's medical school. She also taught health classes at the Phyllis Wheatley YWCA, and wrote articles about health for The Washington Afro-American newspaper.

Oden was a member of the Gulf Coast Medical Association.

== Personal life ==
Oden married fellow physician Thomas A. Stevens in 1938. They had two sons, Thomas and Redmond. Oden and her mother were found shot to death at their home in Washington, D.C. Oden was 65 years old. Her sister's papers at the University of Maryland include materials about Oden.
