= H. Naylor Fitzhugh =

American academic

- Born: October 31, 1909; Washington, D.C., U.S.
- Died: July 26, 1992 (aged 82); New York City, New York, U.S.
- Education: Harvard University (B.A.); Harvard Business School (MBA)
- Occupation: Academic

Howard Naylor Fitzhugh (1909–1992) was an American academic and one of the first African-American graduates of Harvard Business School. Fitzhugh is credited with creating the concept of target marketing.

== Early life ==
Fitzhugh was born on October 31, 1909, in Washington, D.C. He earned a full scholarship to Harvard at the age of sixteen while still a student at Dunbar High School. Fitzhugh, intent on becoming a doctor, studied science and graduated cum laude from Harvard University in 1930. Three years later, he earned his MBA from Harvard Business School in 1933.

== Career ==
Fitzhugh could not find work in his field and returned to his native Washington, D.C., to teach a business course at Howard University. Although the position was meant to be temporary, Fitzhugh continued teaching marketing and management at Howard University for 31 years. At Howard, he developed the university's marketing program, organized its Small Business Center, and advised the student marketing association for many years.

In 1965, Fitzhugh accepted a marketing position at the Pepsi-Cola Company. He worked in establishing the African-American community as a lucrative mass market and created the concept of target marketing in corporate America. He eventually became Vice President for Special Markets at Pepsi.

In 1974, Black Enterprise named him the "Dean of Black Business." The following year, Vice President Nelson A. Rockefeller presented Fitzhugh with a special black enterprise achievement award. Fitzhugh was also a founding member and past president of the National Association of Market Developers, aimed at black consumers, and acted as a consultant for major corporations and, from 1975 to 1981, for the United States Census Bureau. He helped to establish the Black Alumni Association at Harvard Business School and became its first chairman in 1978.

== Death and legacy ==
Fitzhugh died on July 26, 1992, at the age of 82 at New York University Medical Center. After his death, Harvard Business School established an endowed professorship in Fitzhugh’s name. Pepsi also created a fellowship at Harvard University which enable students from Howard University and other historically black colleges and universities to attend Harvard Business School.

== See also ==
- PepsiCo
- Target market
- Lillian Lincoln
