= Rex Goreleigh =

American artist (1902–1986)

- Born: Russell Gordon Goreleigh; September 2, 1902; Penllyn, Pennsylvania, United States
- Died: October 28, 1986 (aged 84)
- Burial place: Princeton Cemetery
- Education: Livingstone College, Art Students League of New York, University of Chicago, Rutgers University
- Occupations: Painter, printmaker, educator

Russell "Rex" Gordon Goreleigh (1902 – 1986) was an African American painter, printmaker, and arts educator. Goreleigh taught arts classes for the Works Progress Administration, and was active in the arts communities of Chicago, New York City, and Princeton, New Jersey. Much of his work depicts the African American experience.

== Early life and education ==
Goreleigh was born on September 2, 1902, in Penllyn, Pennsylvania (now part of the Lower Gwynedd Township). His mother was a housemaid for a local doctor. He studied art as a child.

Goreleigh moved to Philadelphia at the age of 15 upon his mother's death and went on to finish high school in Washington, D.C. at Dunbar High School. At the age of 18, he moved to New York City, where he studied acting at the Lafayette Theater in Harlem.

Goreleigh attended classes at Livingstone College in Salisbury, North Carolina; the Art Students League of New York; the University of Chicago from 1920 to 1924; and at Rutgers University in New Jersey from 1940 to 1941. In 1934, Goreleigh traveled to Europe where he studied under artists Andre Lhote in Paris, and with Leo Z. Moll in Germany.

== Career ==
Goreleigh attended exhibitions at the Harmon Foundation, which inspired him to take up drawing and painting.

He met Diego Rivera while working in a restaurant. Rivera invited to Goreleigh to watch him work on murals he was creating for the Rockefeller family. Goreleigh also became acquainted with artists of the Harlem Renaissance including Jacob Lawrence and Romare Bearden.

Goreleigh worked for the Federal Art Project, a project for the Works Progress Administration, through which he taught art to children at the Utopia Neighborhood House in New York.

In 1934, Goreleigh traveled to Europe to further his art studies in Paris and Germany. He returned to Harlem and taught art at the YMCA. He then moved to Greensboro, North Carolina in 1938. While there, he taught art at the Agricultural and Technical State University of North Carolina and Bennett College for Women and opened an arts center with artist Norman Lewis. The center was based in the Carnegie Negro Library.

In 1939, his watercolors were featured in the Baltimore Museum of Art’s Contemporary Negro Art exhibition.

Goreleigh moved to Chicago in 1940 and managed the Works Progress Administration's South Side Community Art Center. He also produced artwork for a local advertising agency. His work was featured in the 1940 Exhibition of the Art of the American Negro at Chicago's Tanner Art Galleries.

Goreleigh moved to Princeton, New Jersey in 1947 to serve as the first director of Princeton Group Arts. The organization was founded by the local Jewish and Quaker communities to promote racial and religious integration through the arts. The center closed in 1954 due to a lack of funding.

Goreleigh established the Studio-on-the-Canal, a Princeton-based arts center with workshops in painting, printmaking, and ceramics. Painter Hughie Lee-Smith attended classes at the studio.

He was the head of the Roosevelt Public School art program and taught at the Princeton Adult School, the Neuropsychiatric Institute, and the Trenton school district. He served on the Princeton Arts Council’s Board of Trustees from 1969 to 1972.

He died on October 28, 1986, at the age of 84.

== Collections ==
- University of Alabama, Paul R. Jones Collection, Tuscaloosa, Alabama, U.S.
- Harriet and Harmon Kelley Collection of African-American Art
- Petrucci Family Foundation
- University of Delaware
- New Jersey State Museum
- Melvin Holmes Collection of African-American Art
- Woodmere Art Museum, Philadelphia, Pennsylvania, U.S.
- Studio Museum in Harlem, Harlem, New York City, New York, U.S.
