= Paul Breman =

Dutch writer, editor and publisher (1931–2008)

- Born: 19 July 1931; Bussum, Netherlands
- Died: 29 October 2008 (aged 77); London, England
- Occupations: Writer, editor, bookseller and publisher
- Known for: Heritage series of black poetry

Paul Breman (Bussum, 19 July 1931 – London, 29 October 2008) was a Dutch writer, bookseller and publisher.

== Career ==
Breman was first introduced to African-American poetry by Rosey E. Pool during his time at Amsterdam University. In the late 1950s, Breman edited two volumes of African-American poetry, together with Pool, that were both published in the Netherlands. He moved in 1958 to London, where he found work as a bookseller, going on to set up an antiquarian bookshop of note with Ben Weinreb, a partnership that lasted from 1963 until 1967.

In 1962, Breman started the "Heritage" series of black poets, beginning with Robert Hayden's A Ballad of Remembrance and his own anthology Sixes and Sevens. By 1972, he had published 27 titles in the Heritage series. Some of the authors later became famous, such as Mari Evans, Dolores Kendrick, Audre Lorde, Clarence Major and Ishmael Reed. This series, run by a Dutchman in London, became one of the most important publishing outlets for African-American poetry.

== Bibliography (selection) ==
- Co-editor with Rosey E. Pool, Ik zag hoe zwart ik was. Poëzie van Noordamerikaanse negers. Een tweetalige bloemlezing van Rosey E. Pool en Paul Breman (Den Haag: Bert Bakker / Daamen N.V., 1958)
- Co-editor with Rosey E. Pool, Black All Day. American Negro Poetry (Amsterdam: Instituut voor Kunstnijverheidsonderwijs, 1960)
