= Toneri-kōen Station =

Railway station in Tokyo, Japan

Coordinates: 35.7964°N 139.7700°E

NT11 Toneri-kōen Station 舎人公園駅
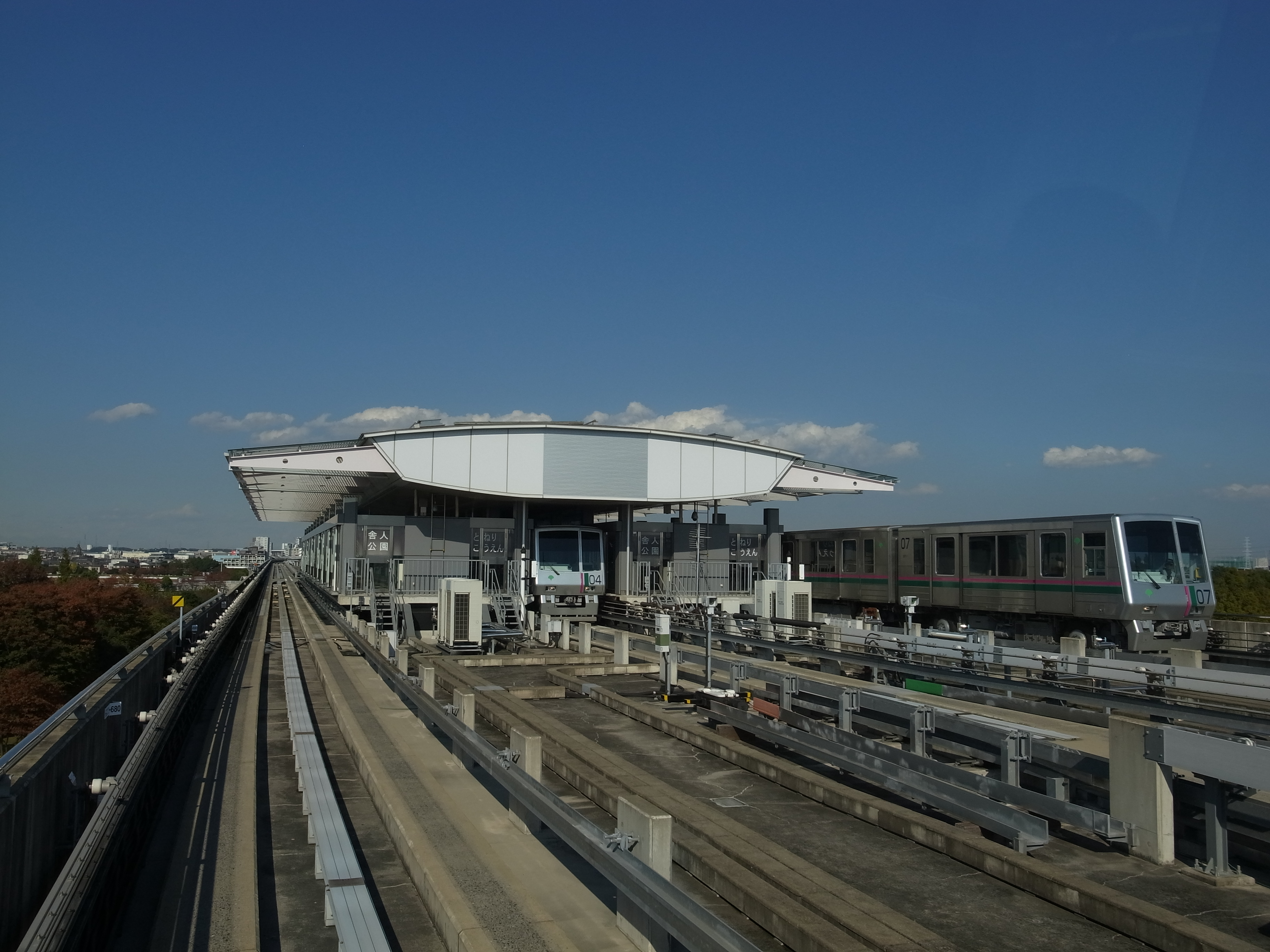
- Station and trains, 2014

General information
- Location: 1-10 Toneri-kōen, Adachi, Tokyo （足立区舎人公園1-10） Japan
- Operator: Toei
- Line: Nippori–Toneri Liner
- Platforms: 2 island platforms
- Tracks: 3

Construction
- Structure type: Elevated

Other information
- Station code: 11

History
- Opened: 30 March 2008; 18 years ago

Services
Preceding station	Toei	Following station
Toneri NT12 towards Minumadai-shinsuikōen	Nippori–Toneri Liner	Yazaike NT10 towards Nippori
Location
- Location within Special wards of Tokyo Location within Tokyo Location within Japan

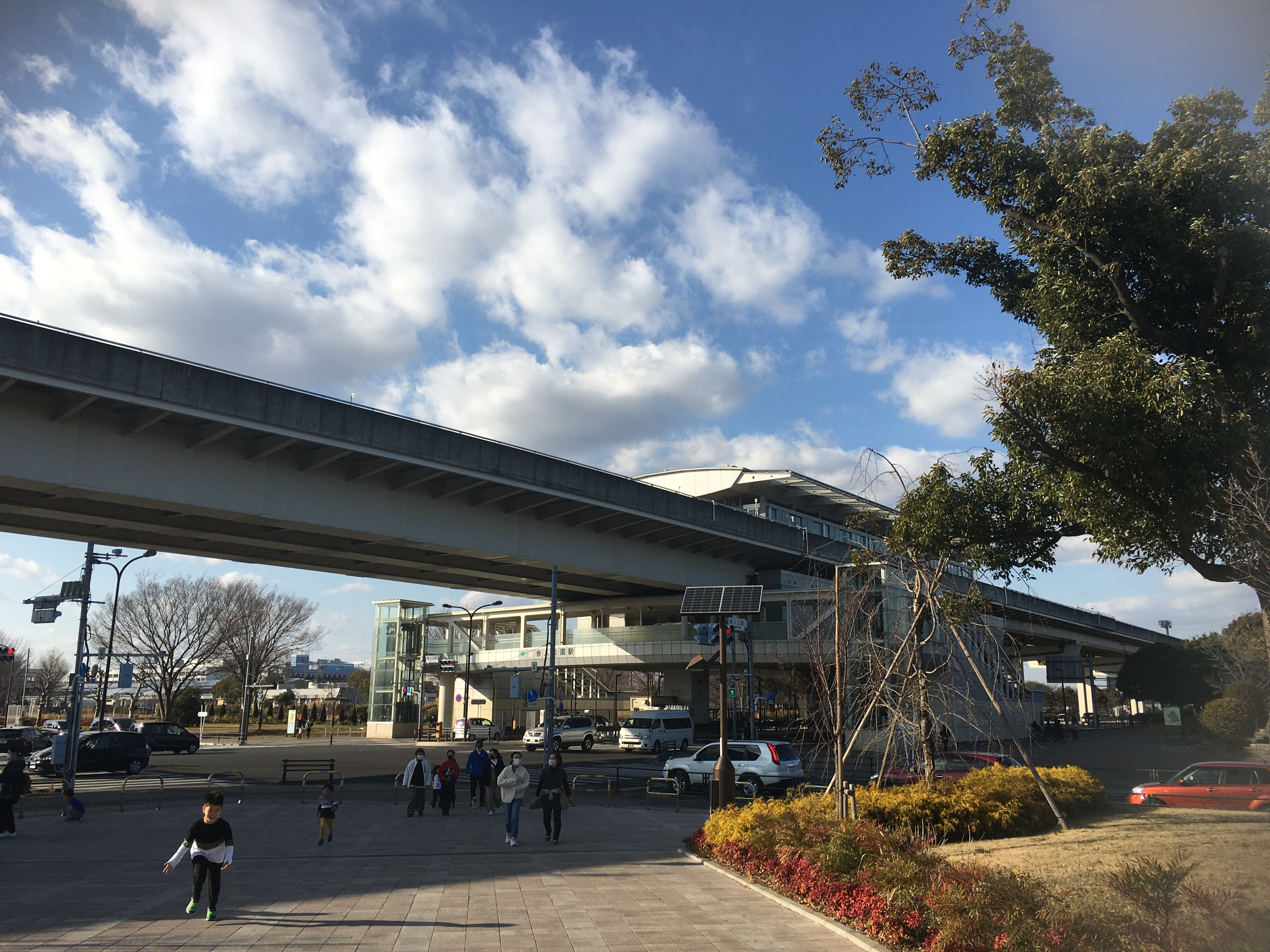
View of the station from the street, 2021

Toneri-kōen Station (舎人公園駅, Toneri-kōen-eki) is a railway station located in Adachi, Tokyo, Japan. The station opened on 30 March 2008. The park is named for the adjacent Toneri Park.

== Lines ==
The station is served by the Nippori-Toneri Line operated by Tokyo Metropolitan Bureau of Transportation (Toei).

== Platforms ==
This elevated station consists of two island platforms serving three tracks. The center track leads to a yard north of the station.

1/2	■ Nippori-Toneri Liner	for Minumadai-shinsuikōen
3/4	■ Nippori-Toneri Liner	for Nishiaraidaishi-nishi, Kumanomae, Nishi-Nippori, Nippori

== History ==
The station opened on 30 March 2008, when the Nippori-Toneri Liner began operation.

Station numbering was introduced in November 2017 with the station receiving station number NT11.
