= Poet Laureate of the District of Columbia =

The poet laureate of the District of Columbia of the official poet of the District of Columbia. The poet laureate is officially appointed by the mayor of the District of Columbia and the DC Commission on the Arts and Humanities. The position of poet laureate of the District of Columbia, which is a lifelong position, is currently vacant.

== History ==
The poet laureate program was established in 1984 by former mayor Marion Barry. The poet laureate is a lifelong position, which has received criticism from a group of concerned arts professionals. In 2018, the group, led by Regie Cabico, wrote a letter to the District leadership requesting a three-year appointment.

== Appointees ==
=== First appointee ===
The first poet laureate was Sterling A. Brown, a native Washingtonian and winner of the Lenore Marshall Poetry Prize he held the position until his death in 1989.

=== Second appointee ===
On May 14, 1999 Dolores Kendrick was named the second poet laureate of the District of Columbia. She hosted events throughout the city including a day devoted to African American poetry during Black History Month. She also developed and managed the Young Champion Poets Program which provides local young poets the opportunity to write and perform their own poetry. Kendrick served until her death in November 2017.
