= Toneri Park =

Park in Tokyo, Japan

Coordinates: 35.7970524°N 139.768412°E

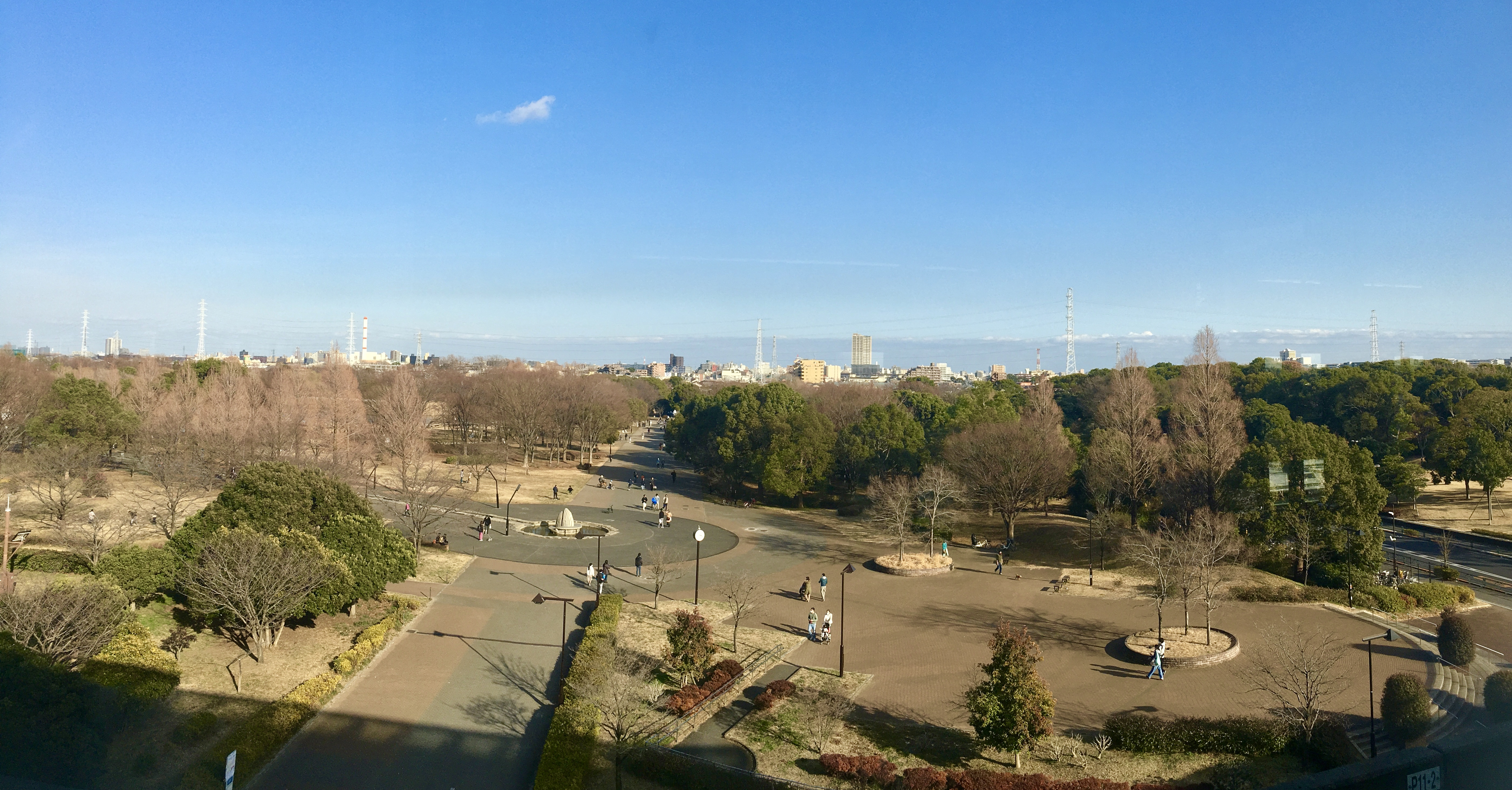
- The park in 2021
- Interactive map of Toneri Park
- Location: Adachi, Tokyo, Tokyo, Japan
- Area: 628,603 square metres (155.331 acres)
- Created: 1904
- Public transit: Toneri-kōen Station

Toneri Park (舎人公園, Toneri Kōen) is a public park in Adachi Ward, Tokyo, Japan. It is the third biggest park in the 23 special wards of Tokyo. It was opened in 1981 to commemorate the 50th anniversary of the Showa Emperor's ascension. The park can be accessed from the adjacent Toneri-kōen Station.

== Facilities ==
Toneri Park has tennis courts, water areas, and a bird sanctuary.

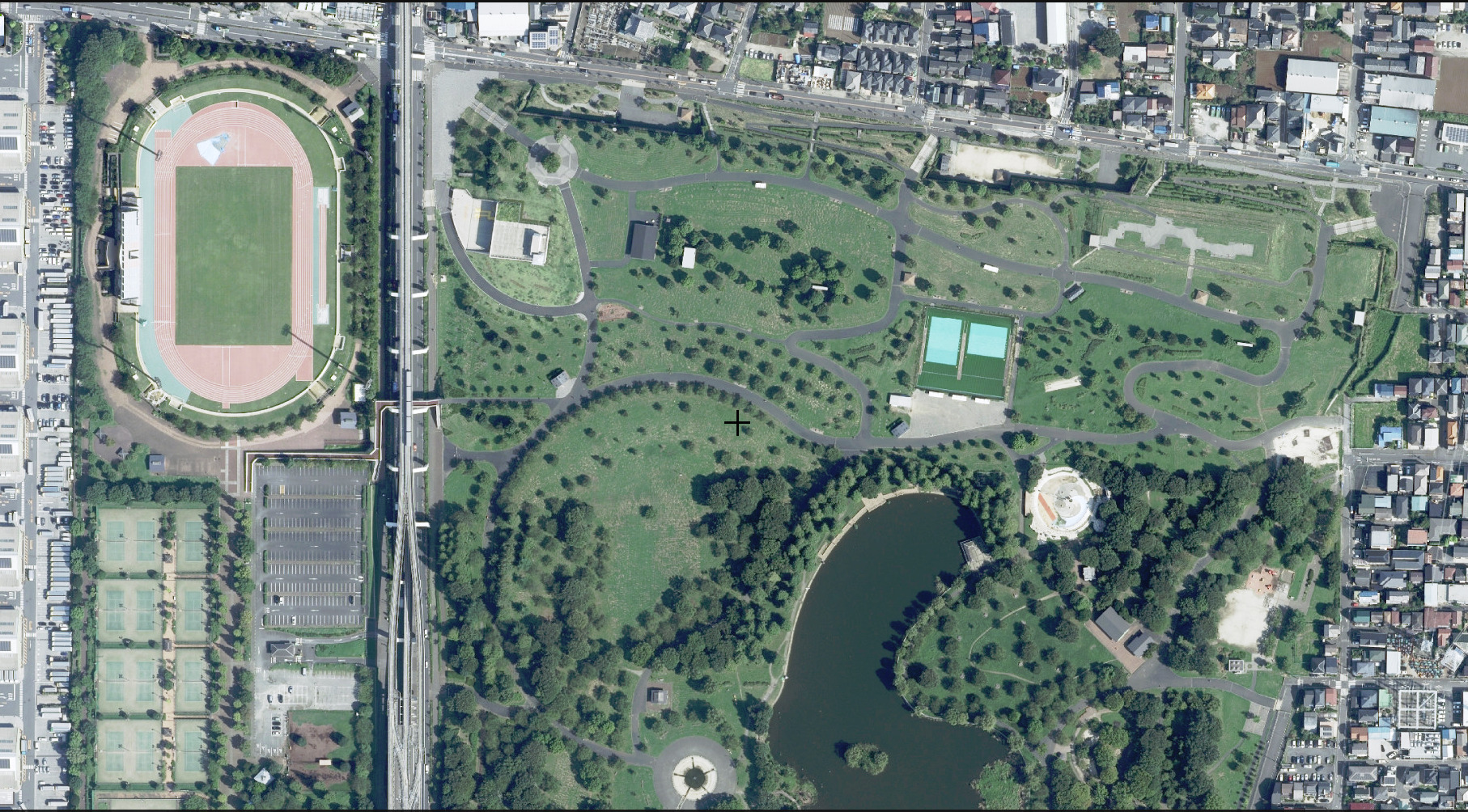
Athletic Stadium

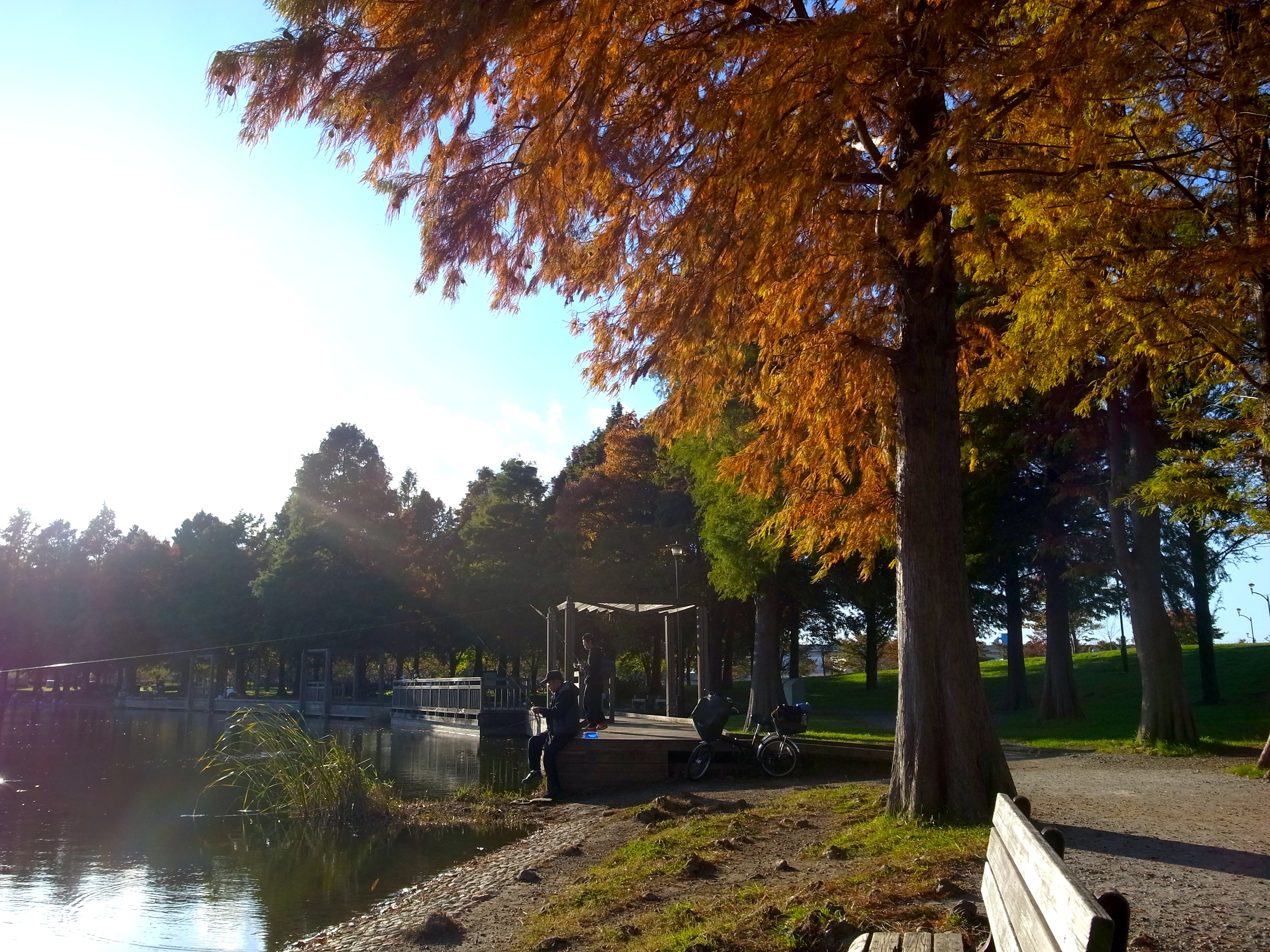
Autumn in Toneri Park

== See also ==
- Parks and gardens in Tokyo
- National Parks of Japan
