= Wall Matthews =

- Born: November 18, 1950 (age 75); Baltimore, Maryland
- Occupations: Composer and performer

Wall Matthews (born November 18, 1950, in Baltimore, Maryland) is a composer and performer (guitar, piano, and percussion). He has released numerous solo recordings and as a member of The Entourage Music And Theater Ensemble.

== Career ==
In the early 1970s, Wall Matthews and Biff Rose performed throughout the US and Canada, and released the album Hamburger Blues. He was composer in residence for dance at Connecticut College from 1978 to 1994. In 1983 he began recording for the label Clean Cuts. In 2003 he started Zen Gardens Music/ZGM. Its first release was Zen Gardens, Music Inspired By The Temples and Gardens of Kyoto. In 2010 ZGM released Air Over Water, one of Zone Music Reporter's top 100 recordings of the year. From 1994 to 2012, Matthews has composed for television and radio for Clean Cuts Music. He was nominated for an Emmy Award in 2010, along with fellow composers Chris Kennedy and Austin Caughlin, for his work on Yellowstone Battle For Life. His 2012 recording "The Dreaming Light" was #48 on Zone Reporter's Top 100 recordings for 2012. His Clean Cuts recording, "Christmas Guitar", was nominated in 2014 for Zone reporter's Holiday Album Of The Year

== Selected discography ==
- The Neptune Collection, The Entourage Music And Theater Ensemble, Folkways (1975)
- Hamburger Blues, with Biff Rose, Sweet Jane Limited (1974, )
- The Dance In Your Eye, Fretless 158 (1981)
- Solo Piano And Guitar, Clean Cuts 708 (1984)
- Riding Horses, Clean Cuts 709 (1987)
- The Heart Of Winter, Clean Cuts 710 (1988)
- Gathering The World, Clean Cuts 712 (1991)
- The Color Of Dusk, Clean Cuts 715 (1996)
- Zen Gardens, Music Inspired By The Temples And Gardens Of Kyoto, ZGM 001 (2003)
- Air Over Water, Wall Matthews And Rusty Clark, ZGM 002 (2011)
- "The Dreaming Light", ZGM 003 (2012)
