= Samuel W. Allen =

American writer, literary scholar, and lawyer

Undated photo taken when Allen was a faculty member at Boston University

Samuel Washington Allen (December 9, 1917 – June 27, 2015), sometimes publishing as Paul Vesey, was an American writer, literary scholar, and lawyer.

Samuel Washington Allen was born on December 9, 1917, in Columbus, Ohio. He graduated as valedictorian of Fisk University in 1938 with an AB in sociology. At Fisk, he studied with James Weldon Johnson. He received a JD from Harvard Law School in 1941 and was drafted into the U.S. Army in 1942. He was an officer in the Army, which was then segregated.

After World War II ended, Allen studied at The New School for a year and then went to Paris on the G.I. Bill, studying at the Sorbonne from 1948 to 1949. His first poems appeared in 1949 in Présence africaine and his first book of poetry was published in 1956. He edited English writing in Présence africaine after Richard Wright left France. His 1959 essay "Negritude and Its Relevance to the American Negro Writer" was published in the journal and widely reprinted.

He worked as a lawyer in government and private practice from the 1940s to 1960s, before being appointed as the Avalon Professor of Humanities at the Tuskegee Institute (now Tuskegee University) in 1968. From 1971, he taught literature at Boston University.

Allen's work was not well known in the United States until the 1960s, when it was published in anthologies edited by Arna Bontemps and Langston Hughes. His 1975 poetry collection Paul Vesey's Ledger "traces the long history of oppression against African Americans".

Allen died on June 27, 2015, in Norwood, Massachusetts.

== Books ==
- Elfenbein Zähne (Wolfgang Rothe, 1956)
- Ivory Tusks and Other Poems (Kriya Press, 1968)
- Paul Vesey's Ledger (Bremen, 1975)
- Every Round and Other Poems (1987)
