= Instituto Conmemorativo Gorgas de Estudios de la Salud =

Public medical research institution of Panama

Coordinates: 8.97042°N 79.53393°W

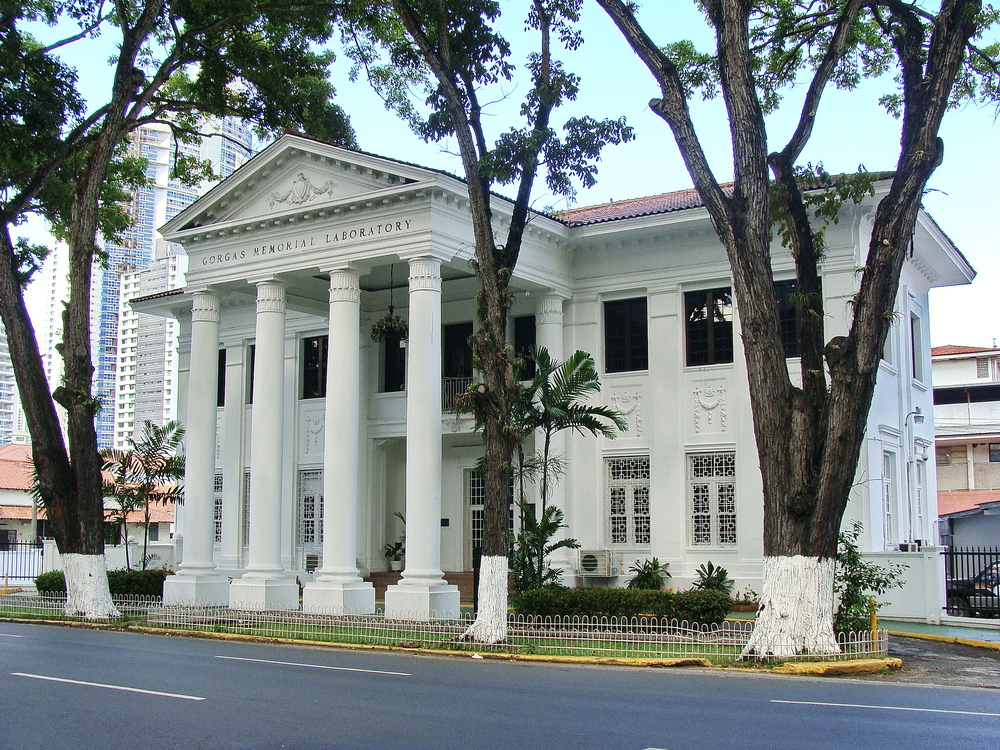
Gorgas Memorial Institute

The Instituto Conmemorativo Gorgas de Estudios de la Salud (The Gorgas Memorial Institute for Health Studies (GMI)) is a medical research institution that has been dedicated for more than 80 years on investigating diseases in the tropics and preventive medicine. Established in 1921, GMI had its building inaugurated in Panama City in 1928. It was administered by the United States until 1990. Since 1990, it has been a part of the Ministry of Health of the Government of Panama.

== History ==
The institute was created in 1921 by Dr. Belisario Porras, to honor Dr. William Crawford Gorgas, who eradicated yellow fever in Panama. This achievement allowed the construction of the Panama Canal. Gorgas Memorial Laboratories was inaugurated in 1928 on Arosemena Avenue. Its expertise in studying the diseases of the tropics originated from the necessity to eradicate yellow fever and control malaria in the cities of Panama and Colon with the construction of the Panama Canal.

== Research ==
This triumph, led by Dr. William C. Gorgas in the first years of the 20th century, was achieved by one of the largest and most successful community-level public health interventions ever recorded in the history of medicine. Since then, many emerging and reemerging diseases have been studied at GMI and physicians and scientists of many nationalities working there have made significant contributions to medicine in the tropics. These collaborations and lines of investigation have continued up to the present.

GMI is known for its high quality laboratories, including those of parasitology, immunology, genomics, entomology, water and food chemistry, bacteriology, entomology and virology. Besides having an epidemiology and biostatistics department, it conducts research on health administration, chronic diseases and human reproduction. GMI has contributed to better the health of Panama and the Central American countries by acting as a reference laboratory to diagnose diseases like yellow fever, malaria, measles, arbovirus febrile illness, viral encephalitidies, influenza, dengue and hantavirus cardiopulmonary syndrome. Jorge Motta, MD, MPH, was the Director General from 2004 to 2008 and the present director is Dr. Nicanor Obaldia

Most recently GMI became a World Bank-Pan-American Health Organization reference laboratory for human immunodeficiency virus (HIV) for the Central American region. Its lengthy tradition of service in the region has permitted GMI to maintain and nurture close contacts and rapid communication with all the public health installations of Panama’s Ministry of Health, with the health installations of the Social Security System and with the main private hospitals of the country.

In 2006, GMI signed an MOU with the Department of Health and Human Services and was also awarded two grants, one to increase its virology diagnostic capacity and to strengthen the surveillance of influenza virus in Panama and Central America and the other to develop a Regional Training Center for community health care workers of the Central American Region.

The Regional Training Center is an educational facility dedicated to community health care workers and clinicians of Central America to prepare them to provide better primary and preventive health care to underserved rural and poor urban communities and indigenous populations. These health care providers are trained to provide the first line of response to health needs of their communities, especially in areas related of infectious diseases, pandemic illness response and the attainment of Millennium Development Health Goals.

GMI's has research agreements and research projects with academic centers like the Johns Hopkins University, George Washington University, the University of South Florida, the University of New Mexico, and the Walter Reed Institute of Research. GMI has developed strong links with the epidemiology programs and the extended immunization programs of all the countries in Central America, with the World Health Organization (WHO), specifically with the Special Programme for Research and Training in Tropical Diseases (TDR) and influenza program, with the Center for Diseases Control of the United of America (CDC-USA) and (CDC-MERTU-G), with the Pan-American Health Organization (PAHO) and with institutions like the Smithsonian Tropical Research Institute (STRI).

Today GMI is an autonomous public institution that works closely with the Ministry of Health. Its vision is to improve the health of Panama and Central America. Its mission is to develop health research in Panama, to fulfill the functions of a national public health laboratory and to provide education to health care workers of the region. GMI is evolving to become Panama’s national public health institute and will continue serving the Ministry of Health by providing the best evidence available to develop public health policy.

A collection of the institute's papers are held at the National Library of Medicine in Bethesda, Maryland.
