= List of Howard University people =

This list of notable Howard University people (alumni sometimes known as Bison) includes faculty, staff, graduates, honorary graduates, non-graduate former students and current students of the American Howard University, a private, coeducational, nonsectarian historically black university, located in Washington, D.C.

== Academia and education ==
=== Presidents and chancellors ===
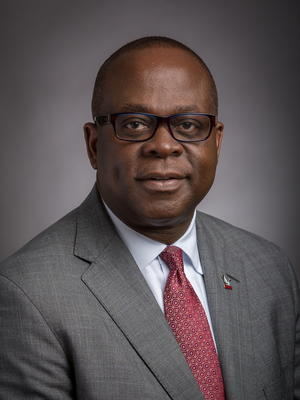
Johnson O. Akinleye

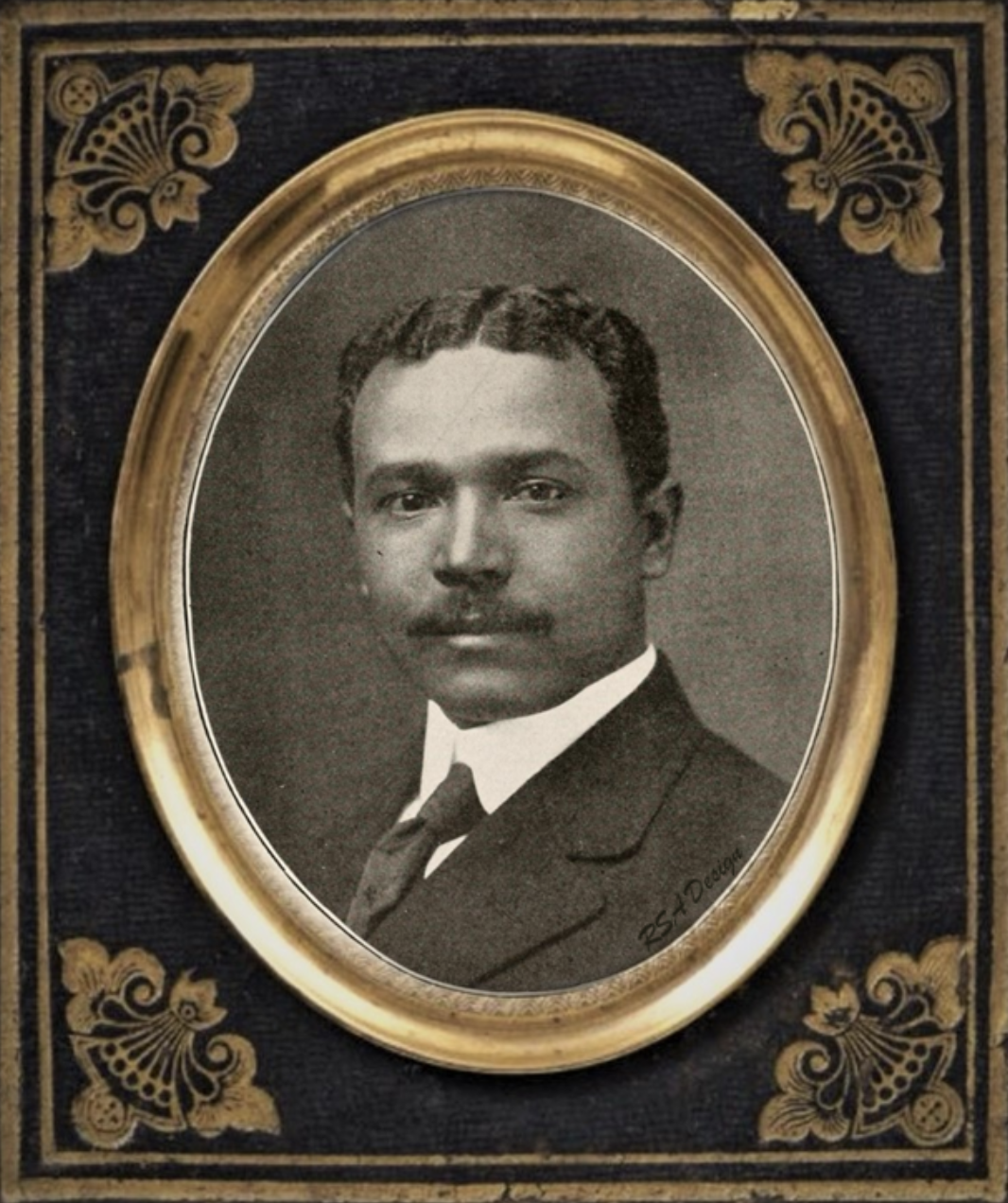
William E. Benson

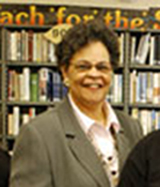
Charlene Drew Jarvis

Name	Class year	Notability	Reference(s)
Johnson O. Akinleye		12th chancellor of North Carolina Central University	
Brenda A. Allen	1981	14th president of Lincoln University	
Delbert Baker		president, Oakwood College	
Wayne A. I. Frederick		17th president of Howard University	
Antoine M. Garibaldi	1973	25th president of University of Detroit Mercy	
Edison O. Jackson		president, Medgar Evers College	
Charlene Drew Jarvis	1964 M.S.	president of Southeastern University	
Franklyn Jenifer		14th president of Howard University; third president of University of Texas at Dallas	
Dr. Heather Knight		21st president, Pacific Union College	
Leonard F. Morse	1912, 1915	president of Edward Waters College; dean of Daniel Payne College and Bethel College (Alabama)	
Inman E. Page		president of the Lincoln Institute, Langston University, Western University, and Roger Williams University	
John Jarvis Seabrook	LL.B. degree 1926	5th president of Claflin College; 2nd president of Huston-Tillotson College	
H. Patrick Swygert	1965	president, Howard University	
Cynthia Warrick	1975	7th president of Stillman College	

=== Deans and provosts ===
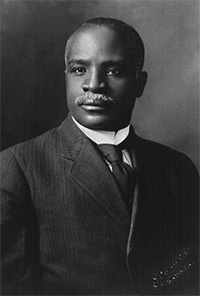
Kelly Miller

Name	Class year	Notability	Reference(s)
James Monroe Gregory	1872	dean of the Howard Collegiate Department; professor of Latin at Howard	
Lena Hill	1997	provost of Washington and Lee University	
Bogart Leashore	1969	dean of the Hunter College school of social work (1991–2003)	
Inabel Burns Lindsay	1920	founding dean of the Howard University School of Social Work	
Howard Hale Long	1915	dean of Knoxville College and Wilberforce University; superintendent of DC Public Schools (1925–1948)	
Marion Mann	1954	dean of the Howard University College of Medicine (1970–1979)	
Kelly Miller	1886	dean of the Howard University College of Arts and Sciences (1907–1919); established the Sociology Department at Howard University	
Harry G. Robinson III	1966, 1970	dean of Howard University School of Architecture and Design; chairman of United States Commission of Fine Arts	
Thomas Wyatt Turner	1901	acting dean at Howard School of Education; professor of botany at Hampton Institute; founding member of NAACP	

=== Professors ===
Name	Class year	Notability	Reference(s)
Christopher James Bonner		historian; professor at the University of Maryland	
Marjorie Lee Browne	1935	faculty at North Carolina College (now North Carolina Central University	
Karen Butler-Purry	1994	professor, Texas A&M University, Department of Electrical and Computer Engineering	
Craig E. Cameron	1937	chair of the Department of Microbiology and Immunology at the University of North Carolina at Chapel Hill	
Kenneth Clark		professor of psychology at City College of New York; founder of the psychology department at Hampton Institute; conducted the "doll research" for the Brown vs. Board of Education case	
Rachel Dolezal	2002 (MFA)	academic; controversial white woman who posed as African-American	
H. Naylor Fitzhugh		professor of marketing and management at Howard University; credited with creating the concept of target marketing	
E. Franklin Frazier	1916	professor of sociology at Morehouse College, where he established the Atlanta University School of Social Work	
Vernon R. Morris	Faculty	emeritus professor in the Department of Chemistry and the director of the Atmospheric Sciences Program at Howard University	
Andre Francis Palmer	1993	associate dean of reaserach at the College of Engineering, Ohio State University	
W. Sherman Savage	1917	historian; professor of history at Lincoln University	
Rosalyn Terborg-Penn		professor of history at Morgan State University	
Rollin Williams	1943	first African-American professor at the University of Connecticut	
Dudley Weldon Woodard		professor who established the mathematics graduate program at Howard	
Carter G. Woodson		history professor at Howard University and West Virginia State University; founder and manager of the Association for the Study of African American Life and History	
Roger Arliner Young	1923	assistant professor at the North Carolina College for Negroes and Shaw University	

== Art and architecture ==
Name	Class year	Notability	Reference(s)
Camille Akeju		art historian and museum administrator	
Louis Arnett Stuart Bellinger	1914	Pittsburgh architect	
David Blackwell	faculty, not alumnus	first African-American elected to the U.S. National Academy of Sciences	
Elizabeth Catlett		sculptor and printmaker	
Adolphus Ealey	1963	artist; Black art authority; curator of the Barnett–Aden Collection of Black art	
Louise Daniel Hutchinson		Director of the Research at the Anacostia Community Museum	
Lois Mailou Jones		artist and educator	
Stephanie Pogue		artist and educator	
Alonzo Robinson, Jr.		architect	
Sylvia Snowden		abstract painter	
Lou Stovall	1965	artist	
Alma Thomas		painter	
Mildred Thompson		painter, printmaker and sculptor	
Tanekeya Word		artist	

== Business ==
Name	Class year	Notability	Reference(s)
Ben Ali		co-founder and owner of Ben's Chili Bowl	
Eddie C. Brown	1961	investment manager and philanthropist; founder and president of Baltimore-based capital management firm Brown Capital Management	
David Bullock		tech entrepreneur and media executive	
David Castain	2013	entrepreneur and philanthropist	
Cathy Hughes		founder and executive of TV One, Radio One	
Hal Jackson		co-owner of the first African-American-owned-and-operated radio station in New York	
Vernon Jordan		senior managing director; Lazard Freres & Co. LLC; former president, National Urban League	
Lillian Lincoln Lambert		founder, former president and chief executive officer of Centennial One, Inc.; first African-American woman to earn an MBA at Harvard Business School	
Depelsha Thomas McGruder	1994	FCOO of the Ford Foundation, founder of Moms of Black Boys (MOBB) United	
Cheryl McKissack Daniel	1983	civil engineer; president and CEO of McKissack & McKissack, the oldest Black-owned architecture and construction company in the US	
Bonita C. Stewart		vice president of Google	

== Civil rights and advocacy ==
Mary Ann Shadd Cary

Name	Class year	Notability	Reference(s)
Thandiwe Abdullah		civic activist	
Agnès Callamard	1988	secretary general of Amnesty International, former Special Rapporteur on extrajudicial, summary, or arbitrary executions for the United Nations Human Rights Council	
Walter Percival Carter		civil rights advocate	
Charles E. "Charlie" Cobb Jr.		civil rights activist; Student Nonviolent Coordinating Committee; "Freedom Schools"; founding member of National Association of Black Journalists; writer	
James L. Farmer	1941	civil rights activist, founder and first leader of Congress of Racial Equality (CORE)	
Virginia Harper		civil rights activist, local NAACP president	
Elaine Jones		former president and director-counsel of the NAACP Legal Defense and Educational Fund	
Hon. John Junor		Minister of Health, Jamaica	
William E. Matthews	1873 (School of Law)	civil rights activist involved with the Colored Conventions Movement, lawyer, businessman	
Enolia McMillan		first female national president of the NAACP	
Clarence M. Pendleton Jr.	1954	chairman, United States Commission on Civil Rights (1981–1988); swimming coach at Howard (1957–1968)	
Homer G. Phillips	1903	prominent lawyer and co-founder of Citizen's Liberty League	
Malik Zulu Shabazz		national chairman of the New Black Panther Party	
Mary Ann Shadd Cary		anti-slavery activist; involved in the Underground Railroad; first black woman to cast a vote in a national election	
A. Langston Taylor		labor activist; national president of the United Domestic Workers of America and the American Industrial League	
Kwame Ture	1964	activist, chairman of the Student Nonviolent Coordinating Committee (SNCC)	

== Education and librarianship ==
Name	Class year	Notability	Reference(s)
William E. Benson	1885	founding president of Kowaliga School and the Dixie Industrial Company	
Hugh M. Browne	1875	principal of the Institute for Colored Youth	
Edna Burke Jackson	1931	namesake of Jackson-Reed High School; first Black woman to teach at what was then Woodrow Wilson High School	
Mollie Huston Lee		first African-American librarian in Raleigh, North Carolina; founder of the first library in Raleigh to serve African-Americans	
Floretta Dukes McKenzie	1957	superintendent of District of Columbia Public Schools	

== Entertainment ==
=== Film and television ===
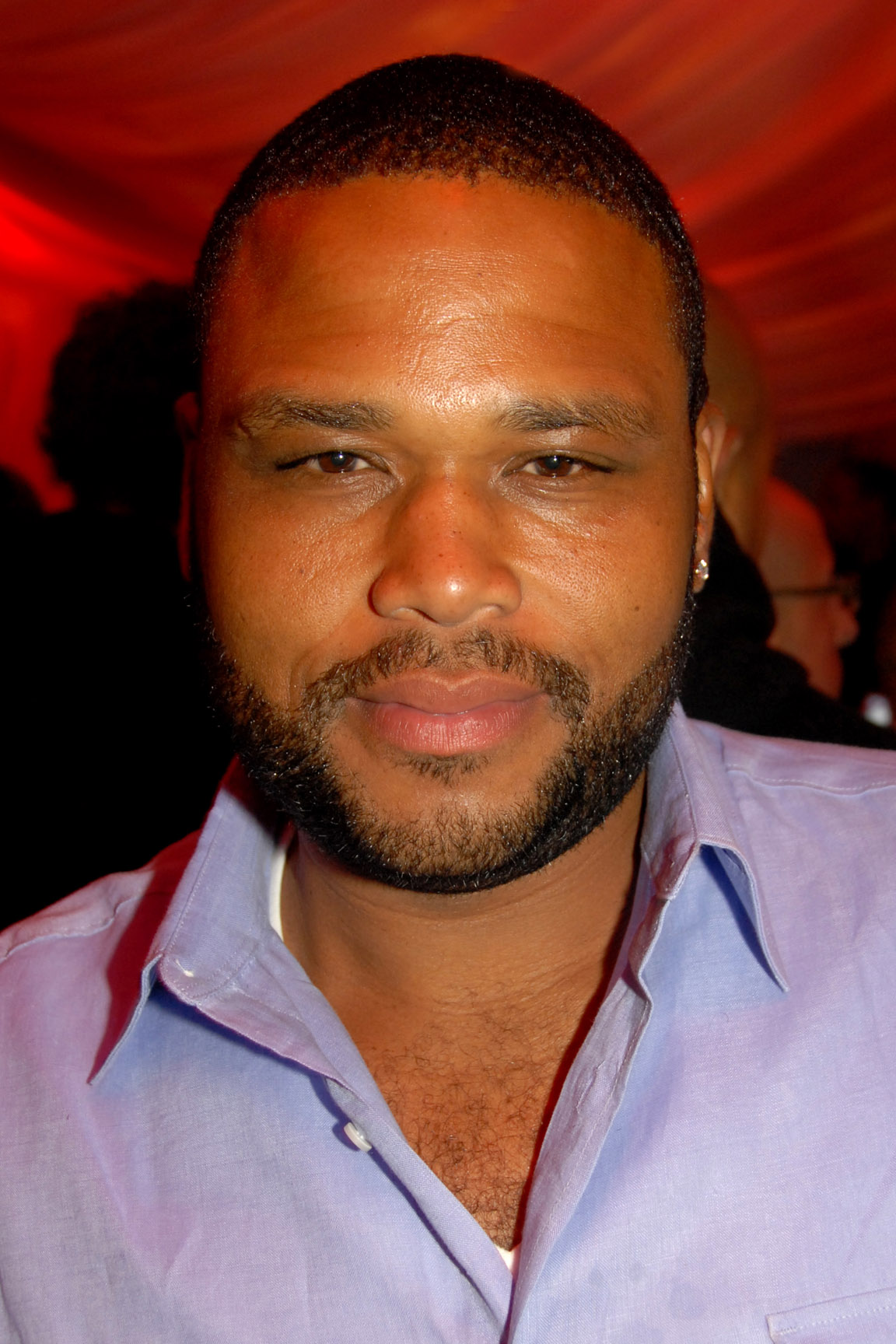
Anthony Anderson

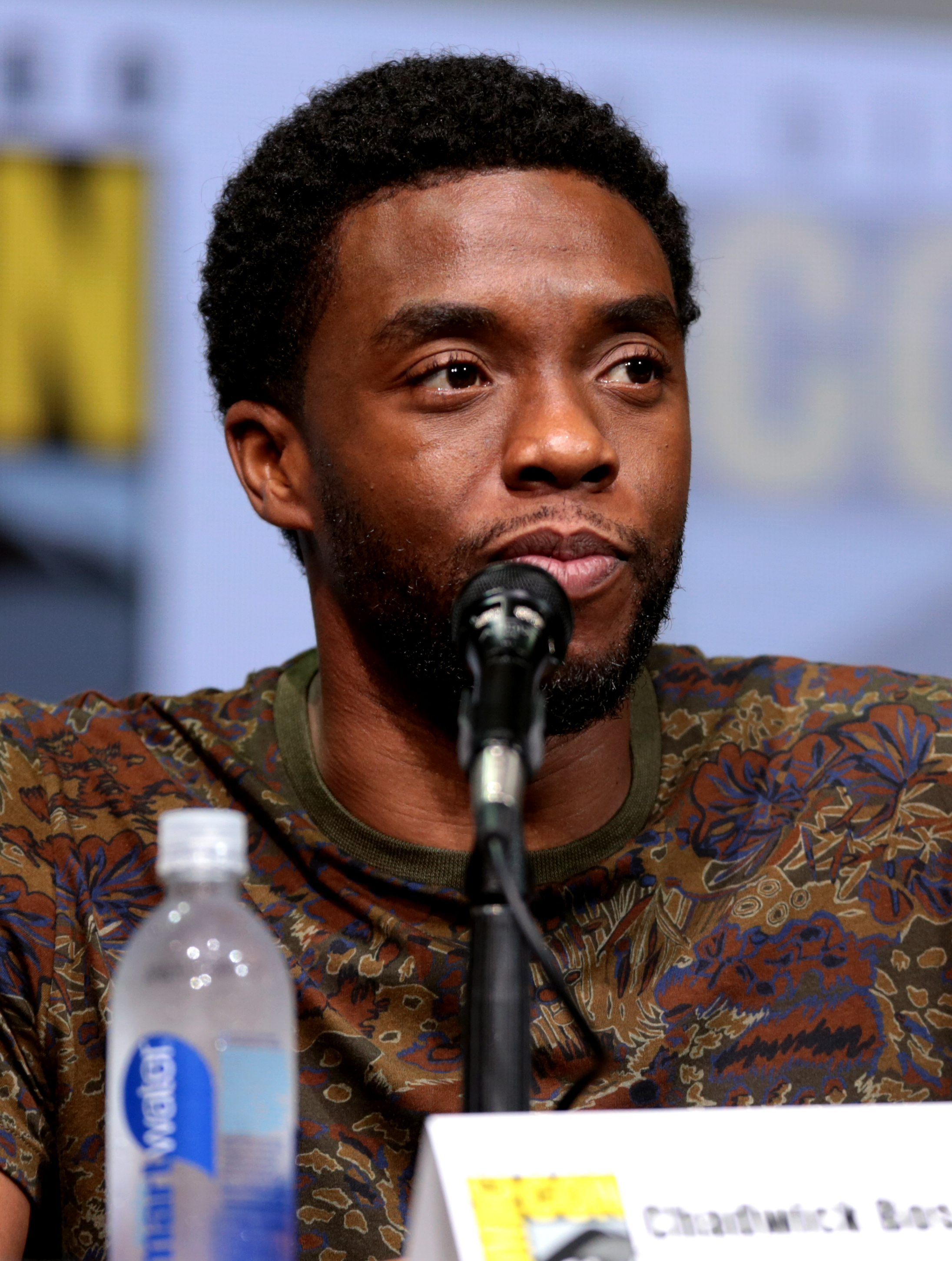
Chadwick Boseman

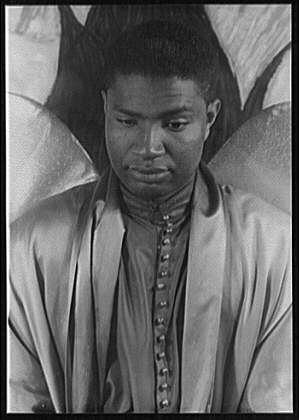
Ossie Davis

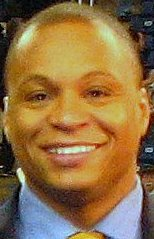
Gus Johnson

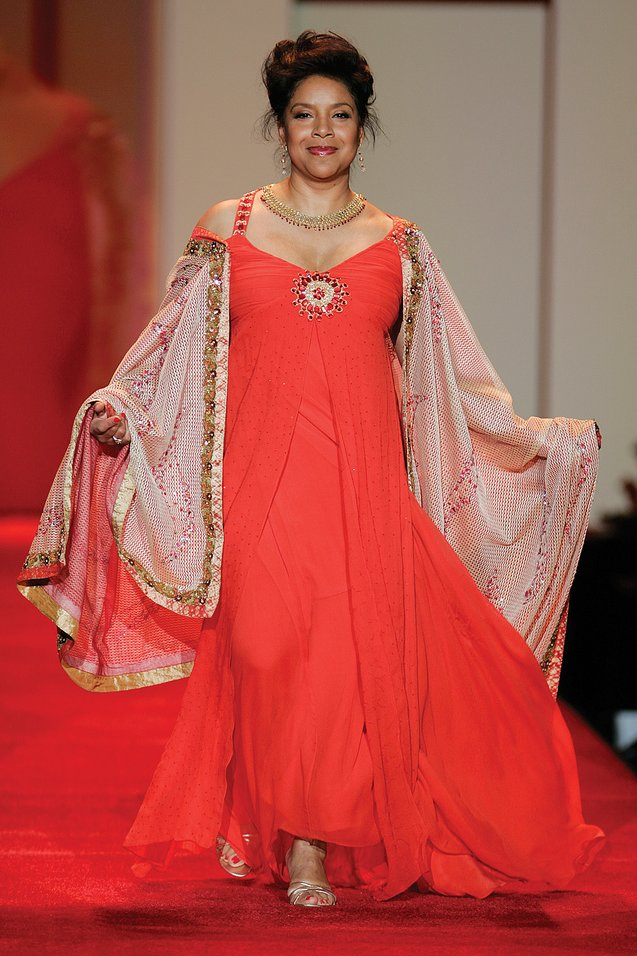
Phylicia Rashad

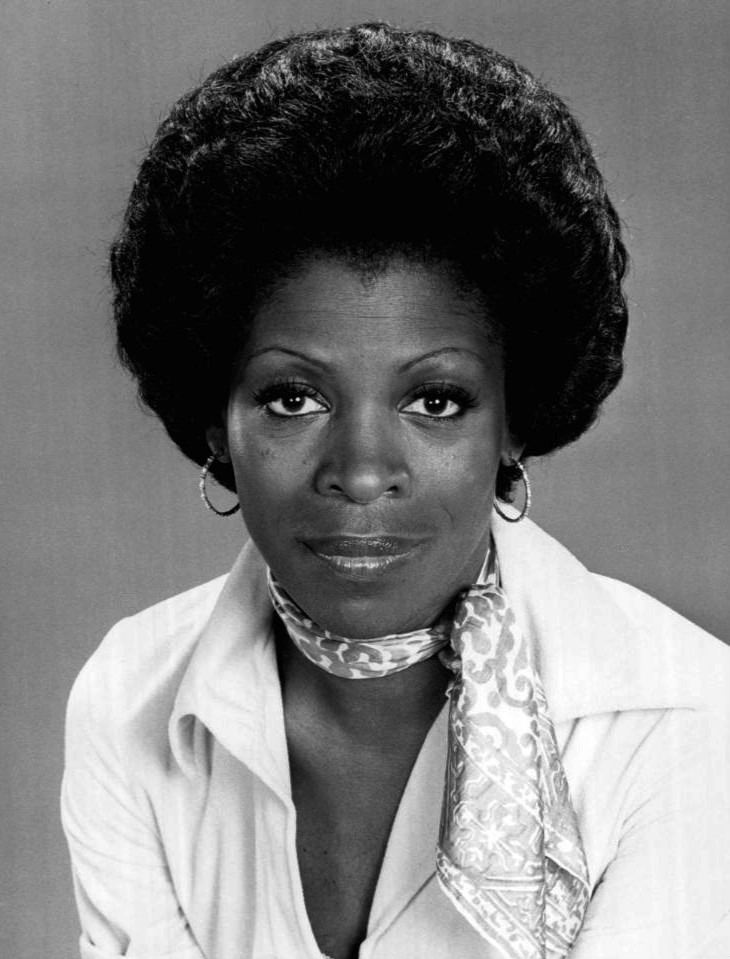
Roxie Roker

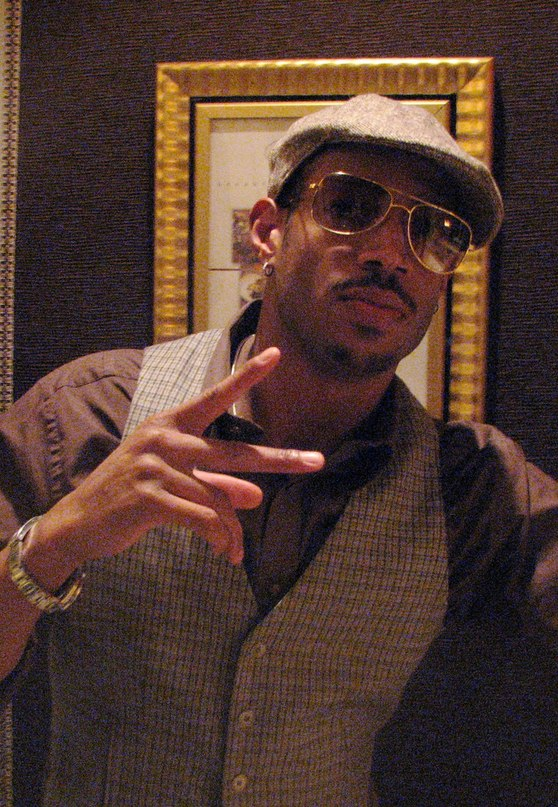
Marlon Wayans

Name	Class year	Notability	Reference(s)
Debbie Allen	1971	dancer, actress, producer/director of A Different World, 1987–1993	
Laz Alonso		actor (Stomp the Yard, Jarhead, Jumping The Broom, This Christmas, Avatar)	
Anthony Anderson	2022	actor (Two Can Play that Game, Barbershop, Kangaroo Jack, The Shield, Law & Order)	
Michelle Bernard		political/legal analyst, MSNBC, The McLaughlin Group	
Victor Blackwell		television anchor, WPBF, West Palm Beach, Florida; anchor and correspondent, CNN (since 2012)	
Chadwick Boseman	2000	actor (Black Panther, 42, Lincoln Heights, Persons Unknown)	
Nick Cannon	2020	actor, comedian, rapper, director, writer, producer and television host	
Ossie Davis		actor and activist	
Wendy Davis		actress, Lifetime Television, Army Wives	
Ernest Dickerson		filmmaker and director, The Wire	
Kevin Grevioux	1991	filmmaker and director, actor, screenwriter, producer, graphic novel creator Underworld, I, Frankenstein, King of Killers, Darkstorm, Blue Marvel	
Lance Gross		actor (Tyler Perry's House of Payne)	
Taraji P. Henson	1995	Academy Award-nominated actress for The Curious Case of Benjamin Button; star of CBS show Person of Interest, also starred in Baby Boy, Hustle and Flow, Smokin' Aces,The Karate Kid (2010)	
Dianne Houston		Oscar-nominated filmmaker	
Sekhar Kammula		film director, producer, screenwriter	
Gus Johnson		sportscaster, CBS Sports	
Michael King		conservative commentator; television producer, WXIA-TV, Atlanta, Georgia	
Ananda Lewis	1995	talk show host (BET, The Ananda Lewis Show)	
Vicki Mabrey		CBS News and 60 Minutes correspondent	
Rita McGhee	1989	Emmy Award-nominated costume designer (Empire, The New Edition Story, Zombies, American Soul)	
Rosalind Miles		actress (Shaft's Big Score!, Friday Foster)	
Michelle Miller		reporter, CBS News	l̩
Julia Pace Mitchell		actress (Notorious, The Young & The Restless)	
Paula Jai Parker		actress (Friday, Hustle and Flow, Idlewild)	
Carl Anthony Payne II		actor (The Cosby Show, Martin)	
Freddie Perren	1966	Grammy Award-winning songwriter/producer (Saturday Night Fever)	
Shauneille Perry	1950	stage director, playwright and educator	
Ayesha Rascoe	2007	reporter, NPR	
Phylicia Rashad	1970	actress (The Cosby Show, A Raisin in the Sun, The Old Settler, The Wiz), first African-American actress to win the Tony Award for Best Performance by a Leading Actress in a Play (A Raisin in the Sun)	
Wendy Raquel Robinson		actress (The Steve Harvey Show, The Game, Two Can Play That Game, Something New)	
Roxie Roker	1952	actress (The Jeffersons); Lenny Kravitz's mother	
Malik Hassan Sayeed		filmmaker	
Al Shearer		former BET personality and actor	
Lori Stokes		news anchor, WABC-TV, New York City	
Tracie Thoms		actress (Rent – The Movie, The Devil Wears Prada, Grindhouse)	
Stacie Scott Turner		The Real Housewives of D.C. entrepreneur; real estate and marketing professional (Procter & Gamble, BET); founded charity Extra-Ordinary Life	
La La Vasquez		television personality and model	
Stan Verrett		anchor, ESPN	
Fredricka Whitfield	1987	anchor, CNN	
Isaiah Washington		actor (Get On The Bus, Love Jones, Grey's Anatomy)	
Susan Kelechi Watson		actress (Louie, This is Us)	
Marlon Wayans		actor (Little Man, White Chicks)	
Richard Wesley	1967	playwright and screenwriter	
Karen Malina White		actress (The Cosby Show, A Different World, Malcolm & Eddie, Lean On Me)	
Lynn Whitfield		Emmy award-winning actress (The Josephine Baker Story, Stompin' At The Savoy, Thin Line Between Love & Hate, Head of State, Eve's Bayou)	
Vantile Whitfield	1957	director, playwright, production designer and influential arts administrator	
Bradford Young		cinematographer (Pariah, Middle of Nowhere, Selma, A Most Violent Year, untitled Star Wars: Han Solo film)	

=== Music ===
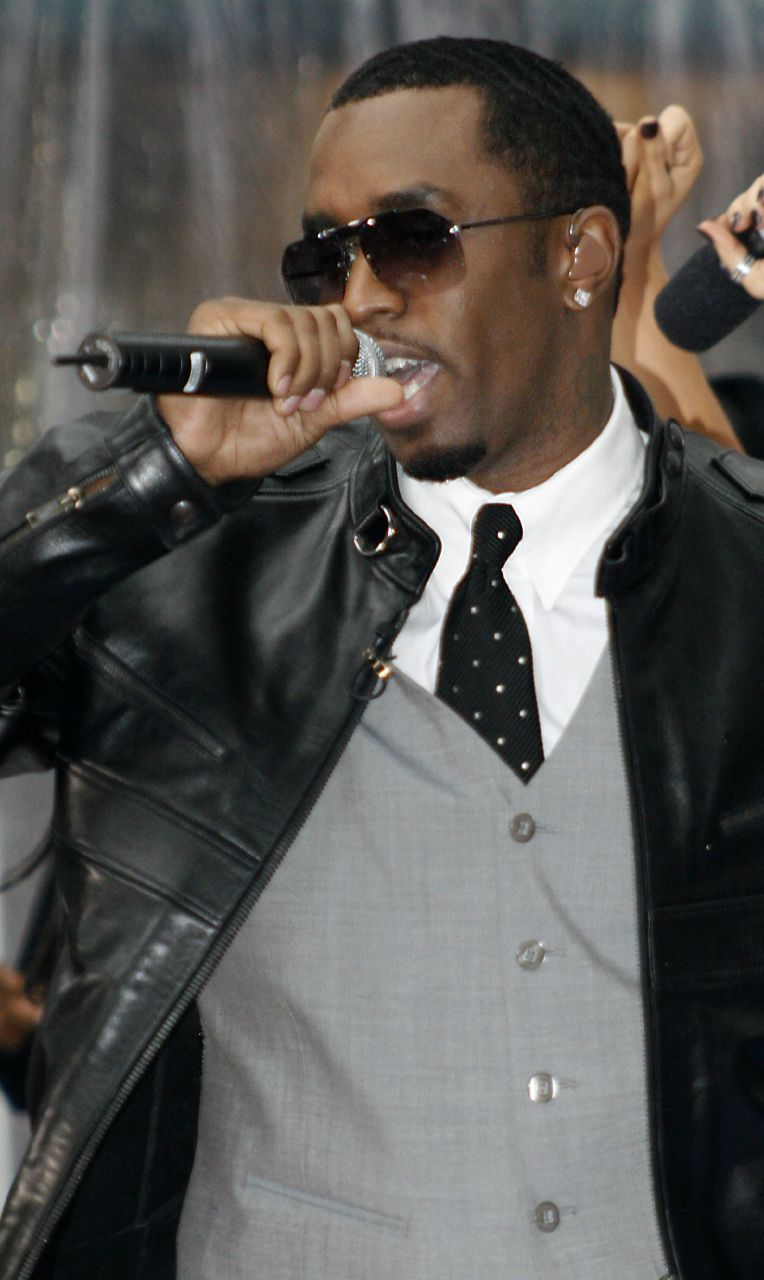
Sean Combs

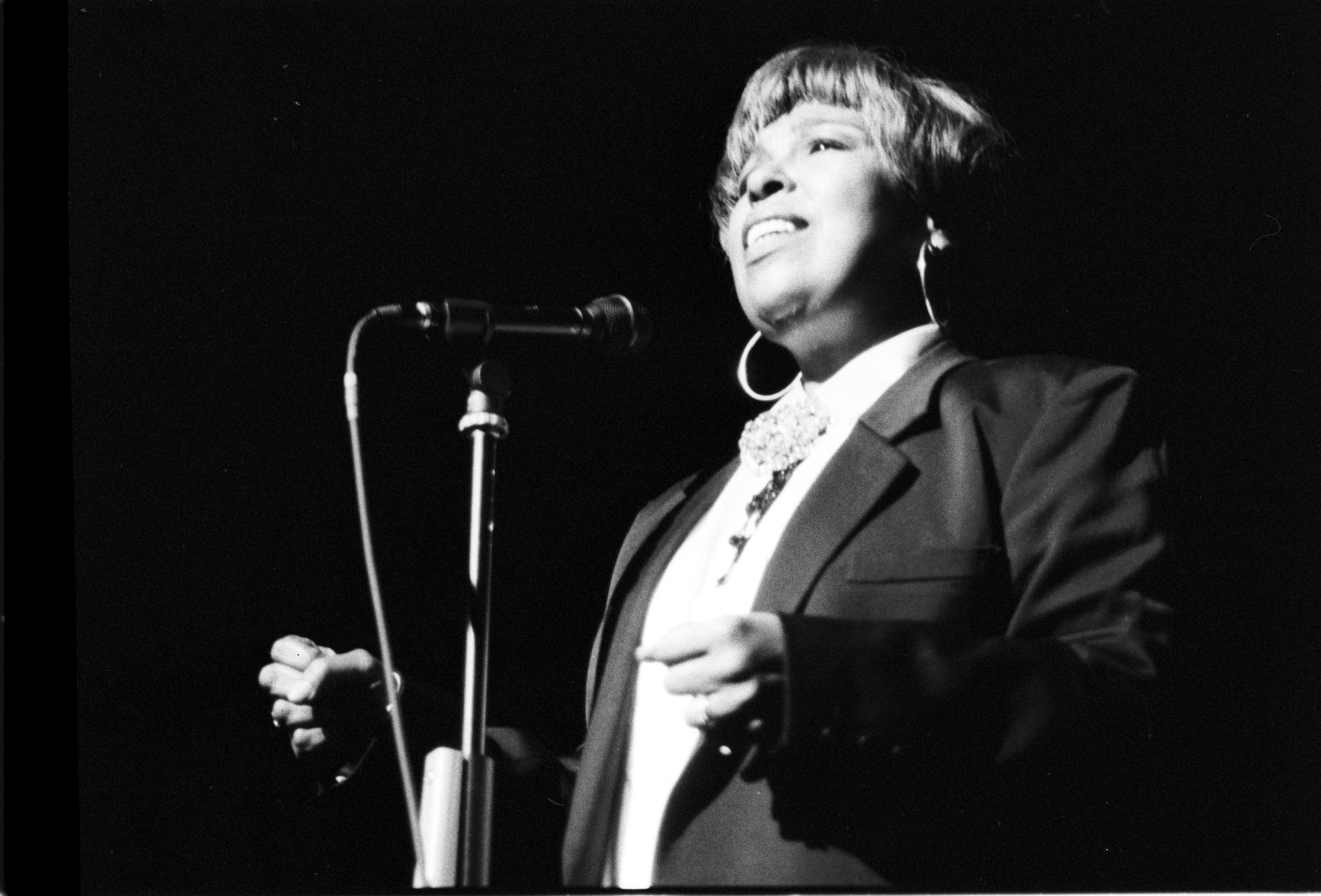
Roberta Flack

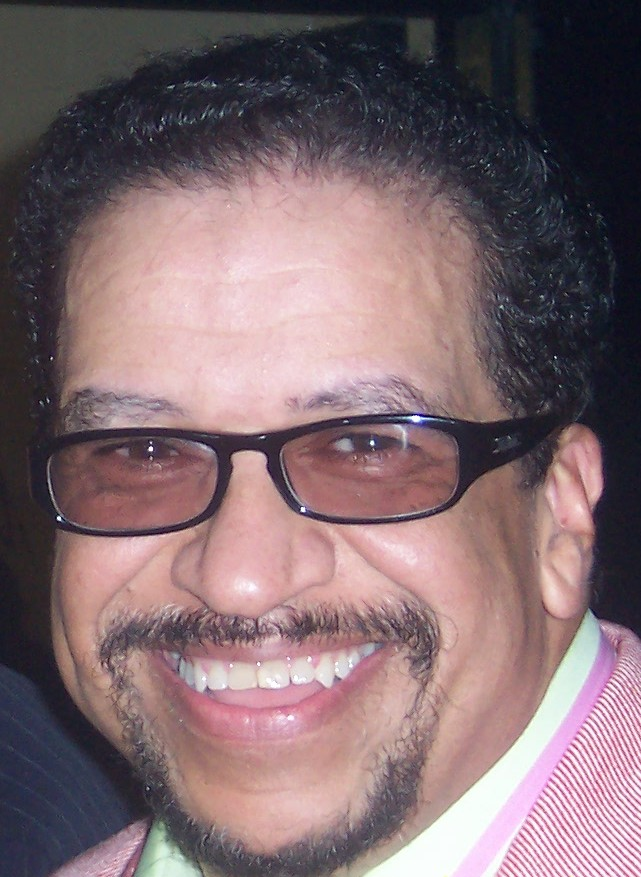
Richard Smallwood

Name	Class year	Notability	Reference(s)
Tawatha Agee		lead singer of the group Mtume	
Geri Allen	1979	jazz pianist	
James A. Bland		musician; composer; author of over 700 songs including the former state song of Virginia	
Amanda Brown		recording artist; singer; songwriter, contestant on season 3 of The Voice	
Donald Byrd		jazz musician	
Sean Combs	2014	music producer and entrepreneur, also known as "Puffy", "P. Money", "Puff Daddy", "P. Diddy" and "Diddy"; received an honorary doctorate from Howard in 2014 at the spring commencement ceremony where he served as the keynote speaker	
Frenchie Davis	2014	Broadway performer, soul, dance/electronica, and pop singer	
Billy Eckstine		singer	
Patrick Ellis	1977	host of "Gospel Spirit" for over forty years on WHUR-FM	
Lillian Evanti		opera singer	
Roberta Flack		singer	
Benny Golson		jazz saxophone player	
Rich Harrison		Grammy-winning record producer and songwriter	
Donny Hathaway		singer	
Shirley Horn		jazz singer and pianist	
Bill Hughes	1952	jazz trombonist, director of the Count Basie Orchestra	
Marcus Johnson		jazz pianist	
Laraaji		ambient musician	
Kenny Lattimore		singer; ex-husband of singer Chante Moore	
Meshell Ndegeocello		recording artist; singer and bassist	
Jessye Norman		opera singer, received Grammy Lifetime Achievement Award in 2006	
Eric Roberson		singer	
Sadat X		rapper, member of hip hop group Brand Nubian	
Shai		band; "If I Ever Fall in Love"	
Richard Smallwood	1971	Grammy Award-winning gospel singer, pianist and composer	
Crystal Waters		house and dance music singer, "100% Pure Love," "Gypsy Woman (She's Homeless)"	
Leighla Whipper		songwriter; music publisher	
Angela Winbush	1977	singer	

=== Pageant queens ===
Name	Class year	Notability	Reference(s)
Candace Allen		Miss District of Columbia USA 2006	
Sabrina Dhowre Elba		2014 pageant winner Miss Vancouver, Canada, model, actress, podcast host and UN activist; wife of actor Idris Elba	
Shauntay Hinton		Miss USA 2002	
Sarah-Elizabeth Langford	(School of Law)	Miss District of Columbia 2002	
Shilah Phillips		first African-American to hold the Miss Texas title, first runner-up Miss America 2007	

== Law ==
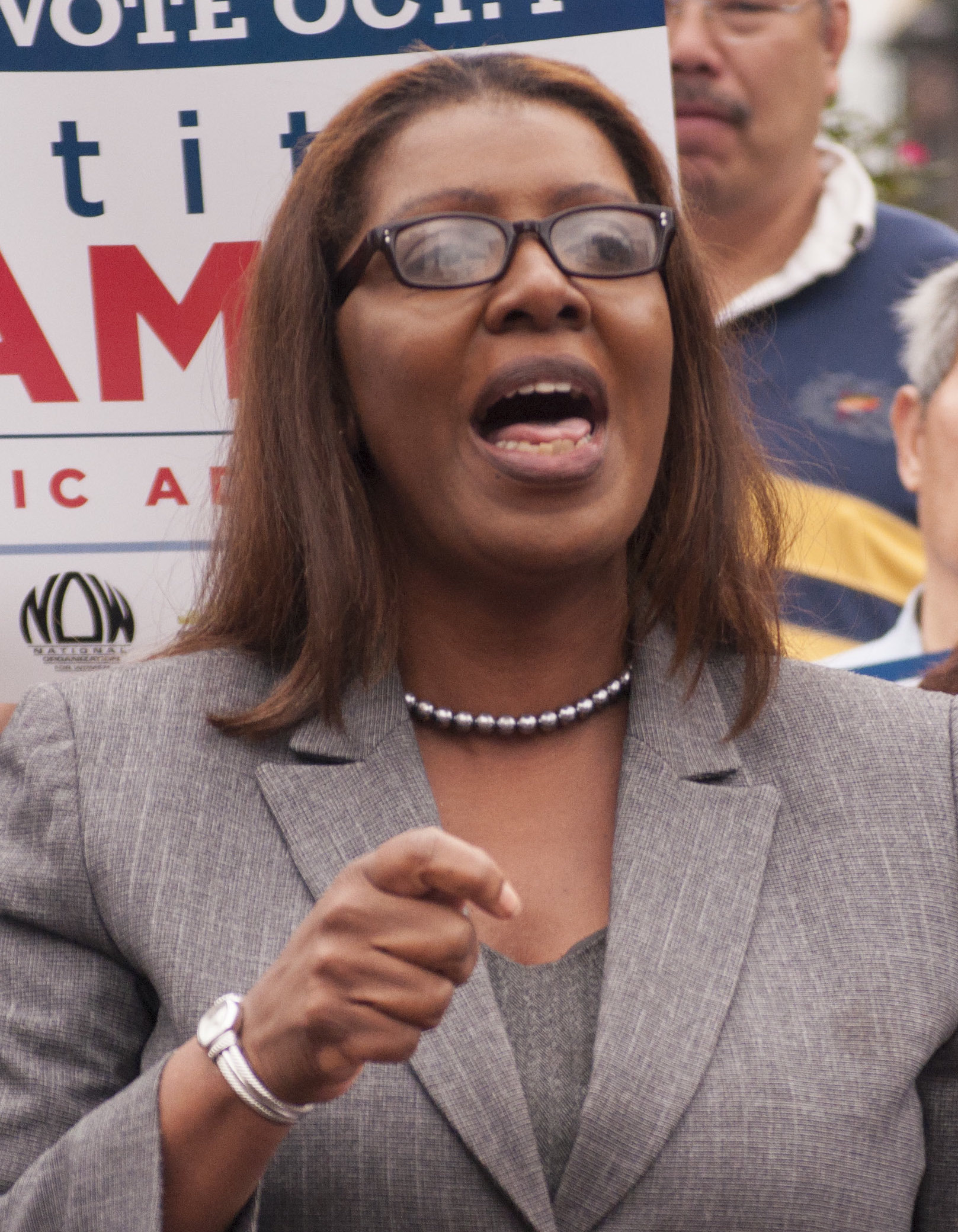
Letitia James

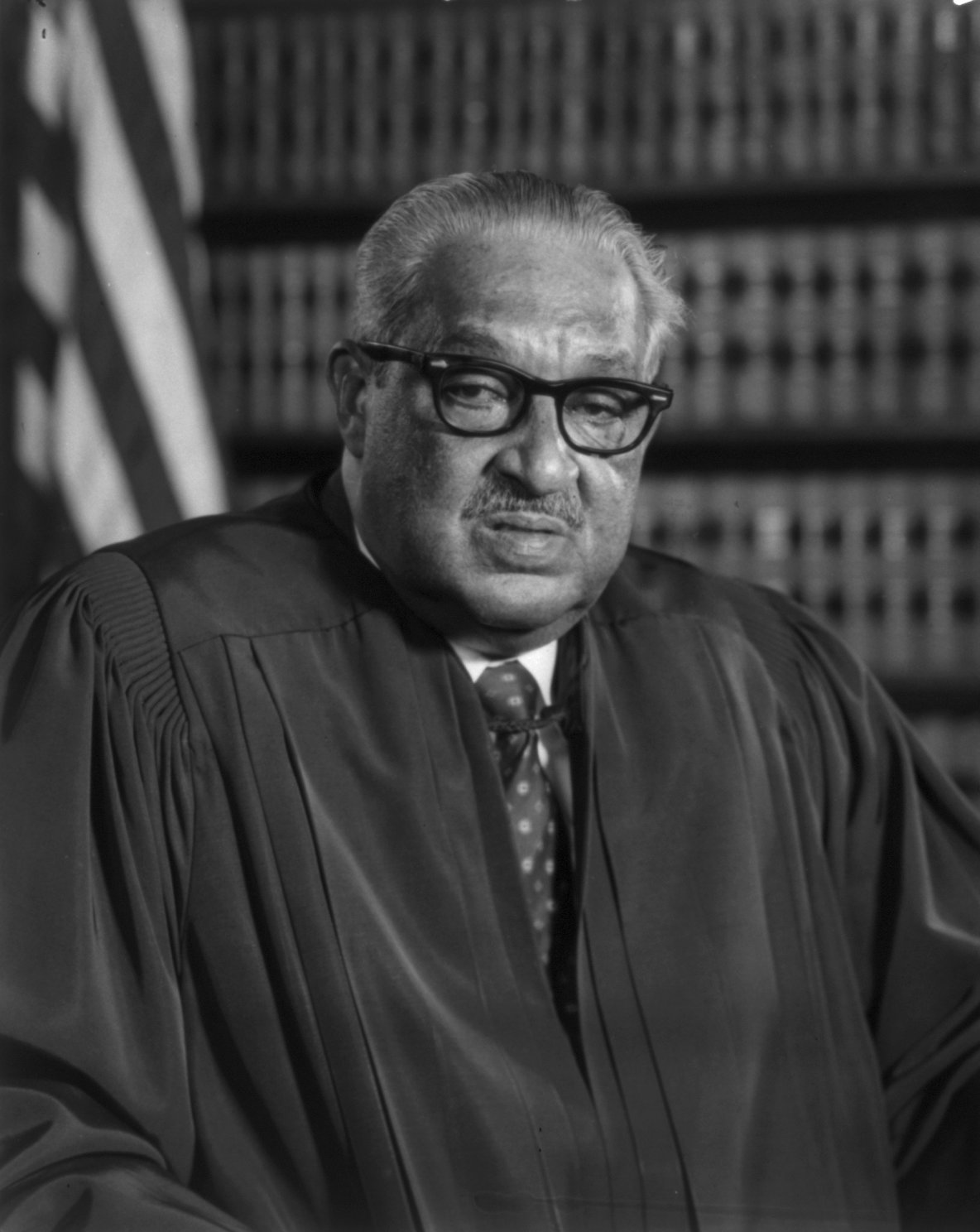
Thurgood Marshall

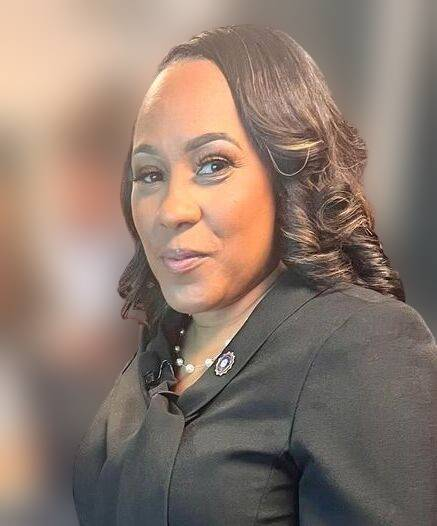
Fani Willis

Name	Class year	Notability	Reference(s)
Robert L. Carter	1940 (School of Law)	judge of the United States District Court	
Alice Pollard Clark	1961	first African American woman to serve as district judge for Howard County, Maryland	
James Dean	1883 (bachelor of law); 1884 (master of law)	first African-American judge in Florida	
Wilkie D. Ferguson	(School of Law)	judge who served on the United States District Court for the Southern District of Florida, the Florida Third District Court of Appeal, and the 11th Judicial Circuit Court of Florida	
Emma Gillett		co-founder of the first law school in the world founded by women; first woman to be appointed notary public by the president of the United States	
John R. Hargrove Sr.		judge, United States District Court, Maryland	
William Henry Harrison Hart		attorney who won the 1905 Hart v. State of Maryland case	
Joseph Hatchett	1959	former Florida Supreme Court judge; first African-American in the south to win a statewide election	
Letitia James		first African-American woman elected attorney general of New York	
Howard Jenkins Jr.	1946–1956	labor lawyer; first African American to serve on the National Labor Relations Board	
Thurgood Marshall	1933 (School of Law)	first African-American U.S. Supreme Court justice	
Richard Mays	1965	justice of Arkansas Supreme Court; mmember of Arkansas House of Representatives	
Gabrielle Kirk McDonald	1966 (School of Law)	judge, Iran-United States Claims Tribunal, The Hague, Netherlands	
Vicki Miles-LaGrange		district judge, Western District of Oklahoma; first African-American woman U.S. attorney for the Western District of Oklahoma; first African-American woman elected to the Oklahoma Senate	
Hon. Peggy Quince		first African-American woman on Florida Supreme Court	
Charlotte E. Ray		first African-American woman lawyer	
Spottswood Robinson	1939 (School of Law)	judge, United States Court of Appeals; also faculty	
James R. Spencer		chief judge of the U.S. District Court for the Eastern District of Virginia	
Dale Wainwright		first African-American elected to the Texas Supreme Court	
James A. Washington Jr.	1936; 1939 (School of Law)	judge for the Superior Court of the District of Columbia; dean of Howard Law School 1969–1971	
Fani Willis	1992	first female district attorney of Fulton County, Georgia	
Carolyn Wright	1978 (School of Law)	lawyer, jurist, chief justice of the Fifth Court of Appeals of Texas	

== Literature and journalism ==
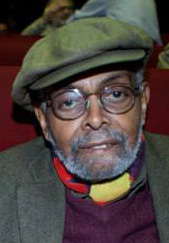
Amiri Baraka

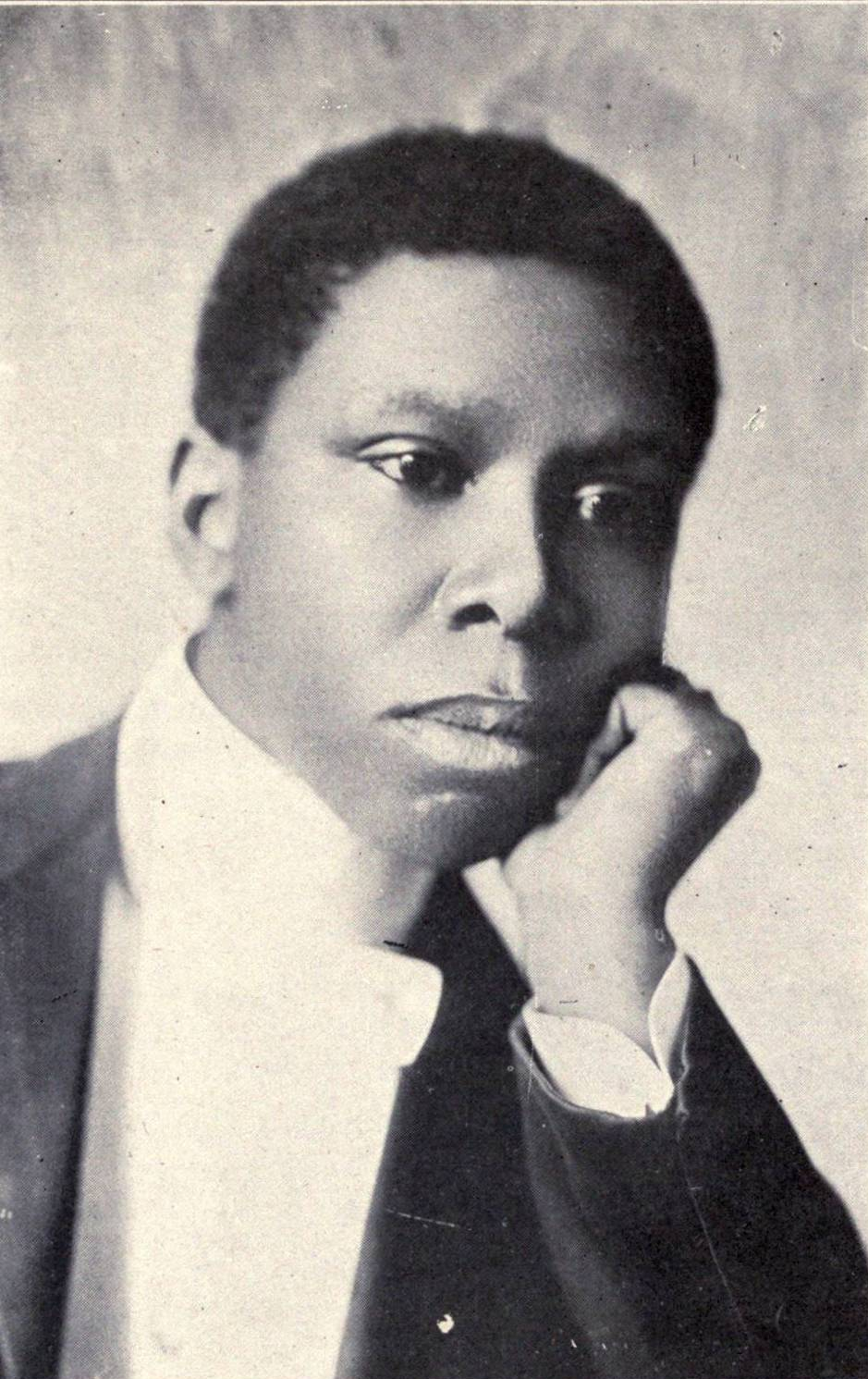
Paul Laurence Dunbar

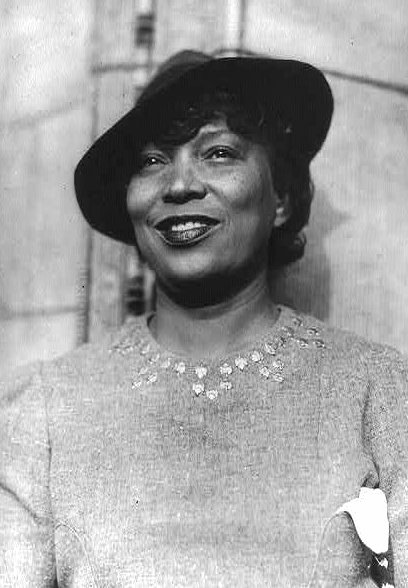
Zora Neale Hurston

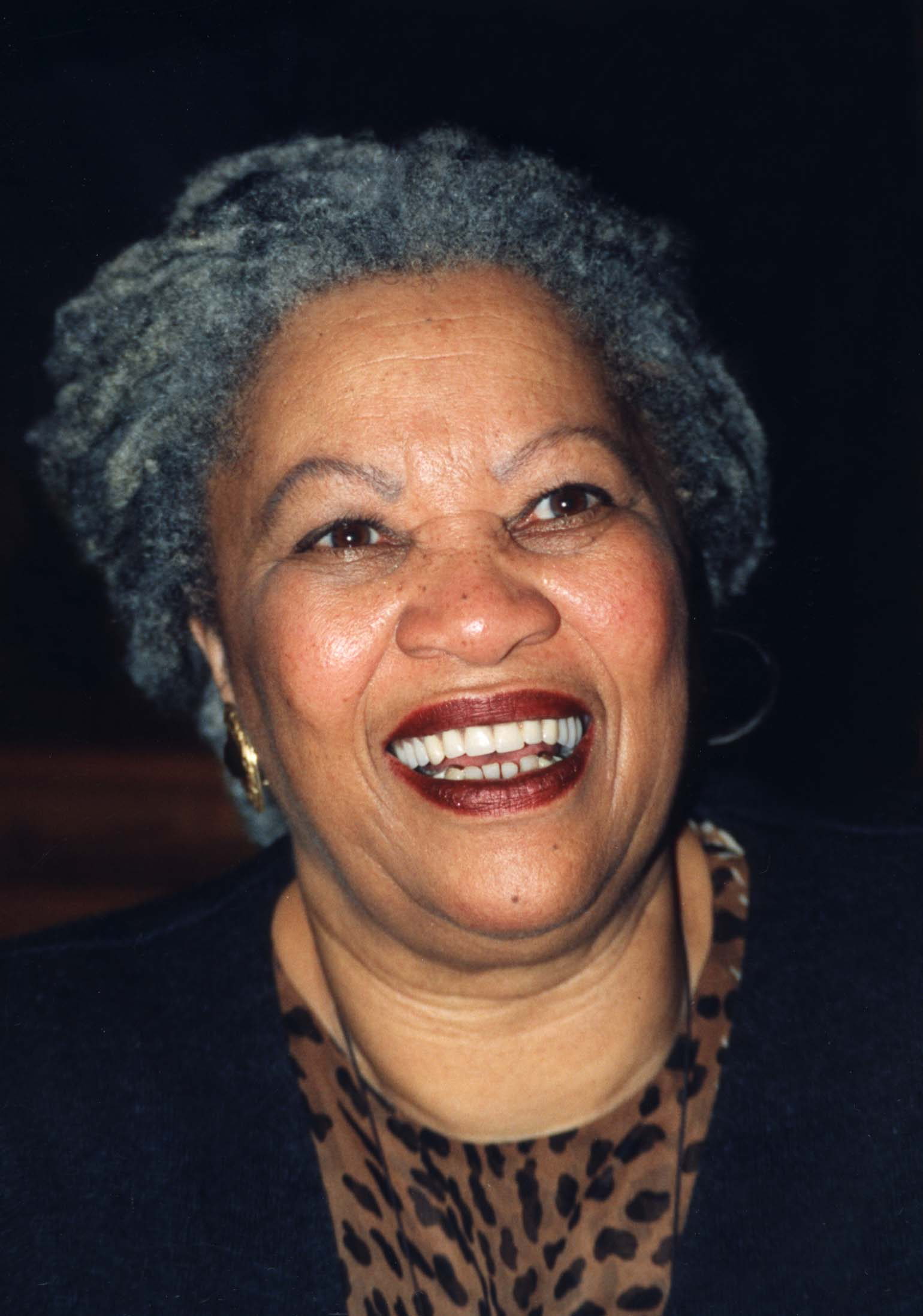
Toni Morrison

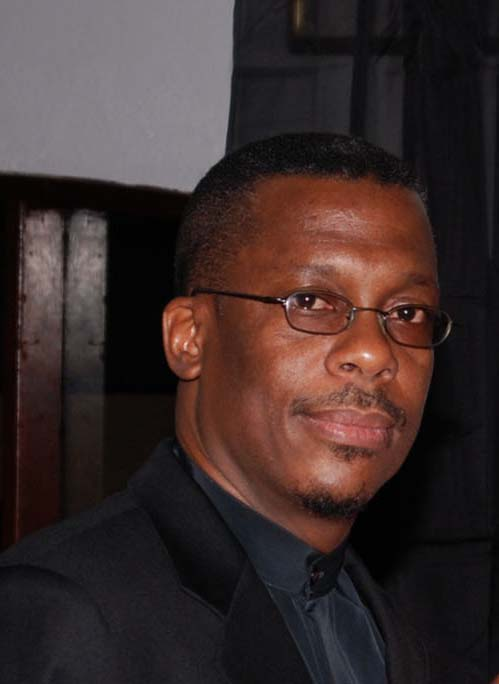
Lasana M. Sekou

Name	Class year	Notability	Reference(s)
Amiri Baraka		author and poet	
Cheryl Clarke	1969	poet, essayist, and activist	
Pearl Cleage		poet, essayist and journalist	
Ta-Nehisi Coates		author and journalist	
Jelani Cobb		author, historian, professor and journalist	
Leon Dash		Pulitzer Prize winner, The Washington Post	
Paul Laurence Dunbar		late 19th-century poet	
G. David Houston		academic and Professor of English at Howard University	
Zora Neale Hurston		anthropologist and author	
Candice Iloh		poet and author	
Colbert King		Pulitzer Prize-winning columnist for The Washington Post	
May Miller		poet and playwright of the Harlem Renaissance	
Wayétu Moore		author, publisher, activist	
Toni Morrison	1953	Nobel Prize for Literature; Pulitzer Prize winner	
Solomon Mutswairo		novelist and poet	
Gloria Oden	BA 1944, JD 1948	Pulitzer Prize-nominated poet, professor	
Robert Pelham Jr.	1904	founder and editor of the Detroit Plaindealer	
Lasana M. Sekou	MA, 1984	poet, author, publisher	
Karintha Styles		sports journalist with The Oklahoman and the Times-Picayune; poet	
Tom Terrell	1972	music journalist and NPR music commentator	
Omar Tyree		novelist	
Valerie Wilson Wesley		author	

== Military ==
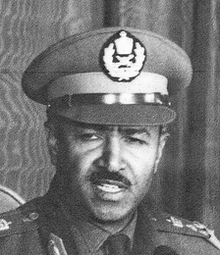
Aman Andom

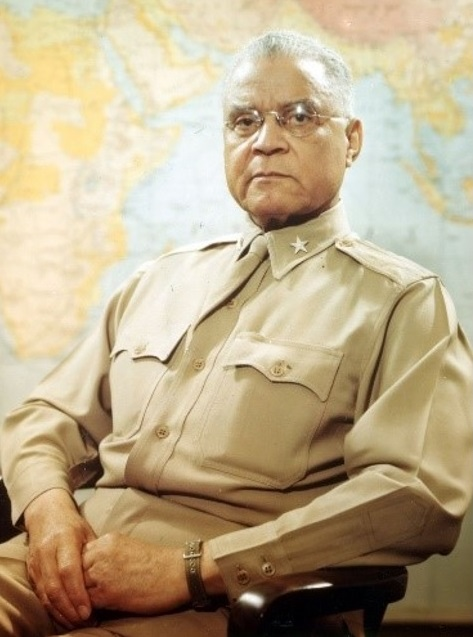
Benjamin O. Davis Sr.

Name	Class year	Notability	Reference(s)
Aman Andom	1965	major general in the Ethiopian Empire Army and Derg, member of Ethiopian Senate and de facto head of state of Ethiopia	
Benjamin O. Davis Sr.		brigadier general, first African-American general in the U.S. Army	
Frederic E. Davison	1938	first African-American major general and division commander in the U.S. Army	
Lester Lyles	1968	general, U.S. Air Force; vice chief of staff of the Air Force; commander, Air Force Materiel Command, Wright-Patterson Air Force Base, Ohio	
Togo West	1965	also JD 1968; former secretary of Veterans Affairs; former Secretary of the Army	

== Politics ==
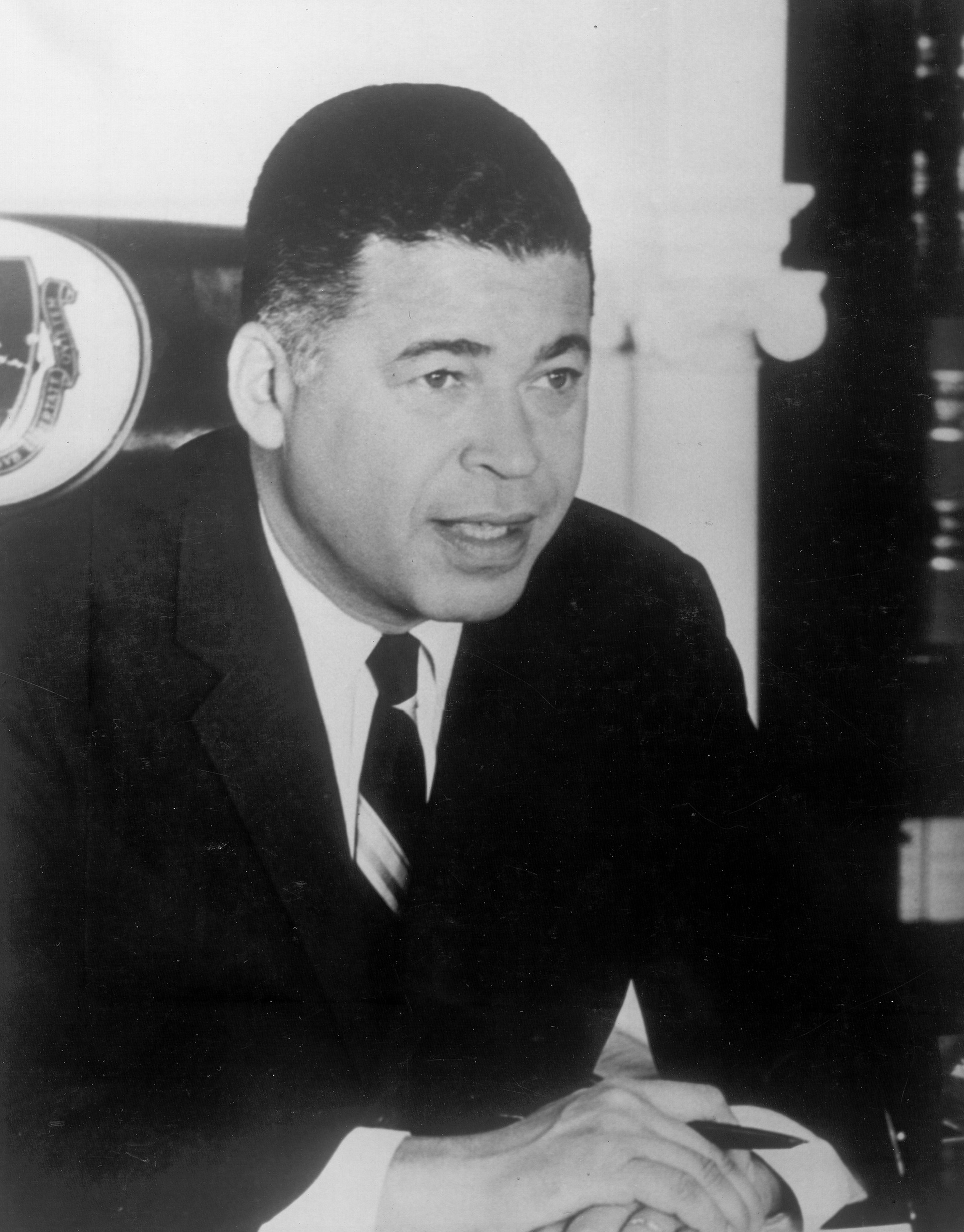
Edward Brooke>

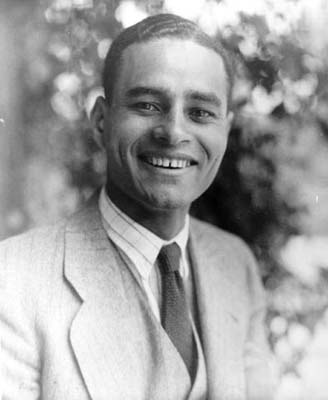
Ralph Bunche

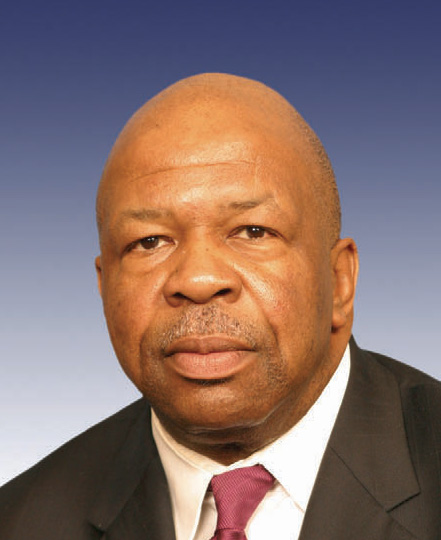
Elijah Cummings

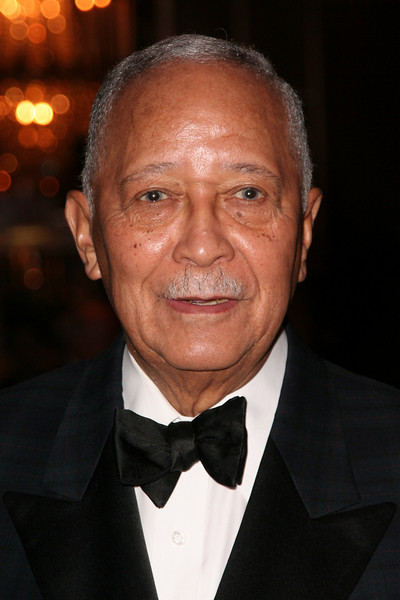
David Dinkins

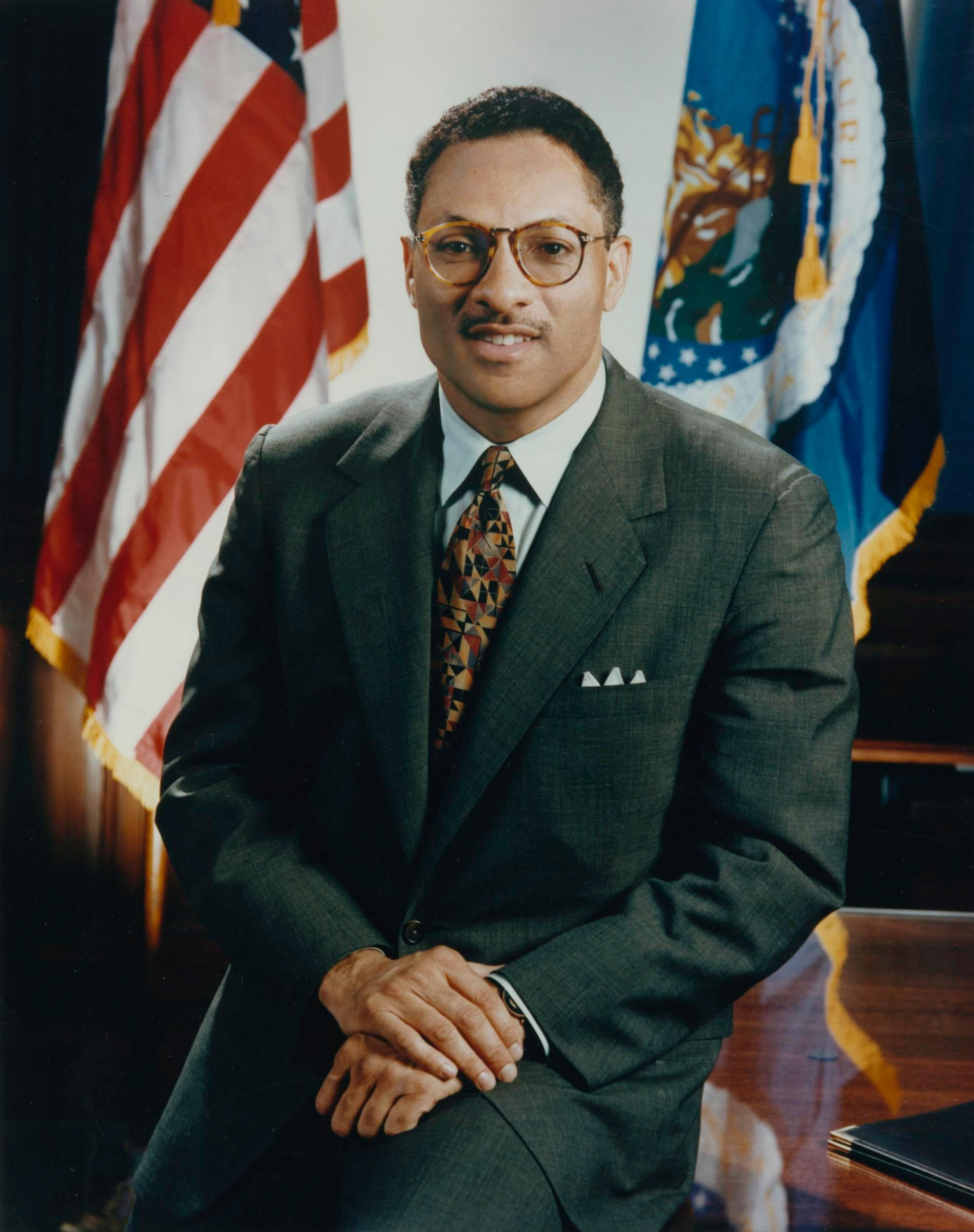
Mike Espy

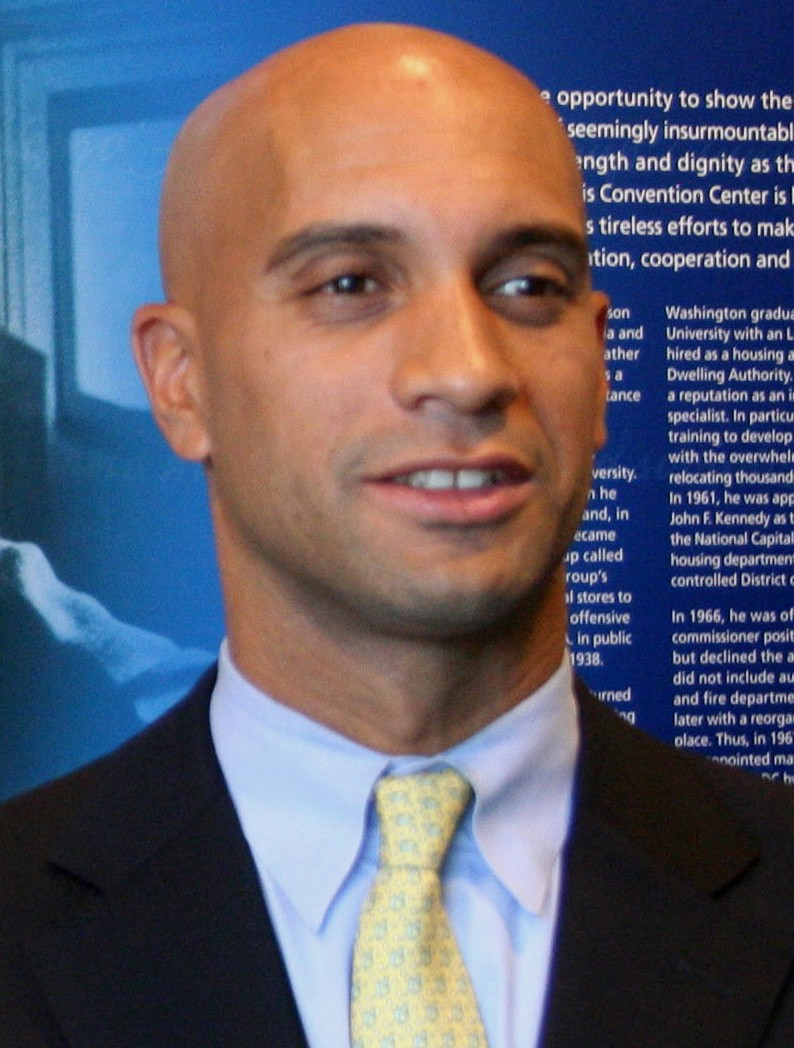
Adrian Fenty

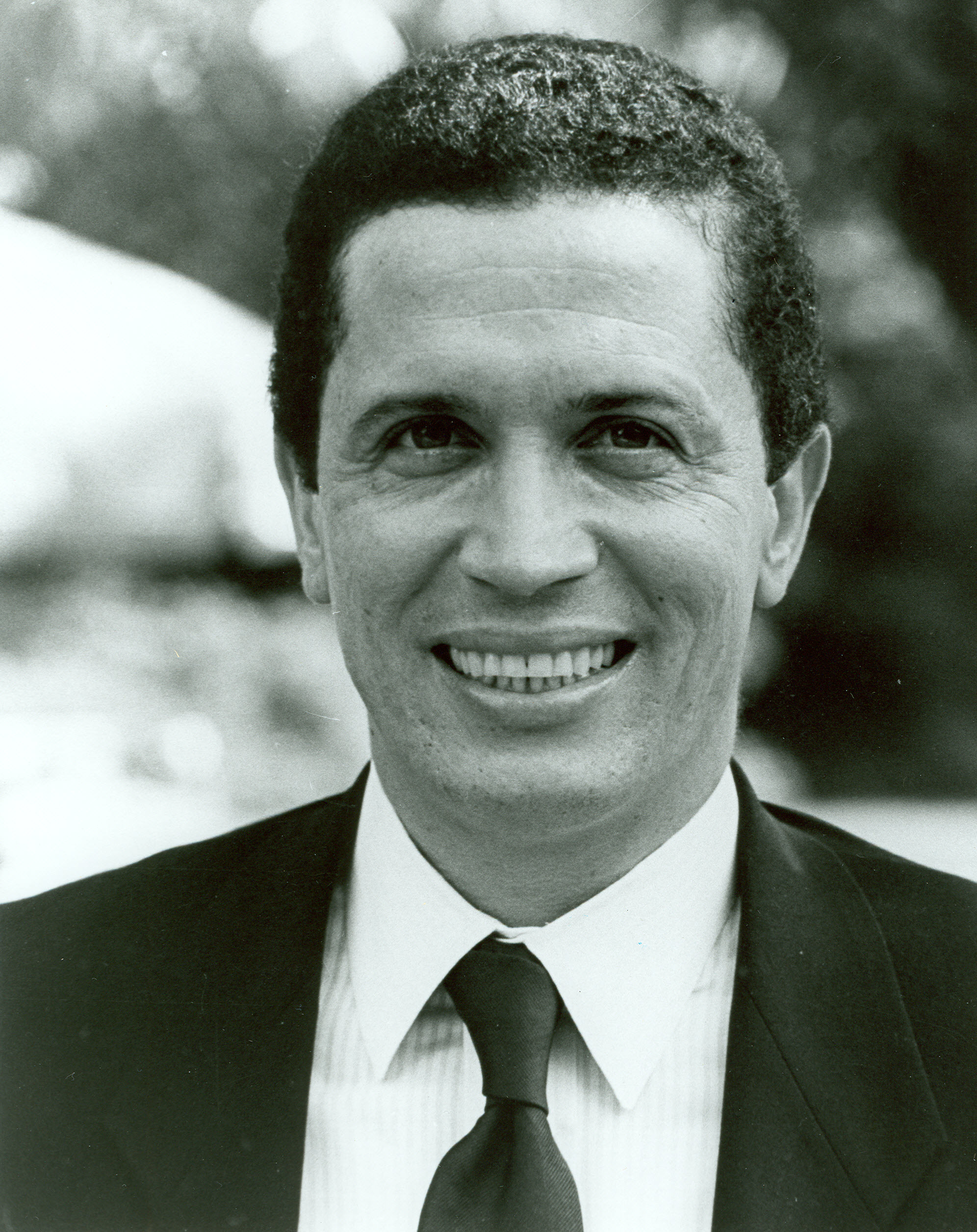
Harold Ford Sr.

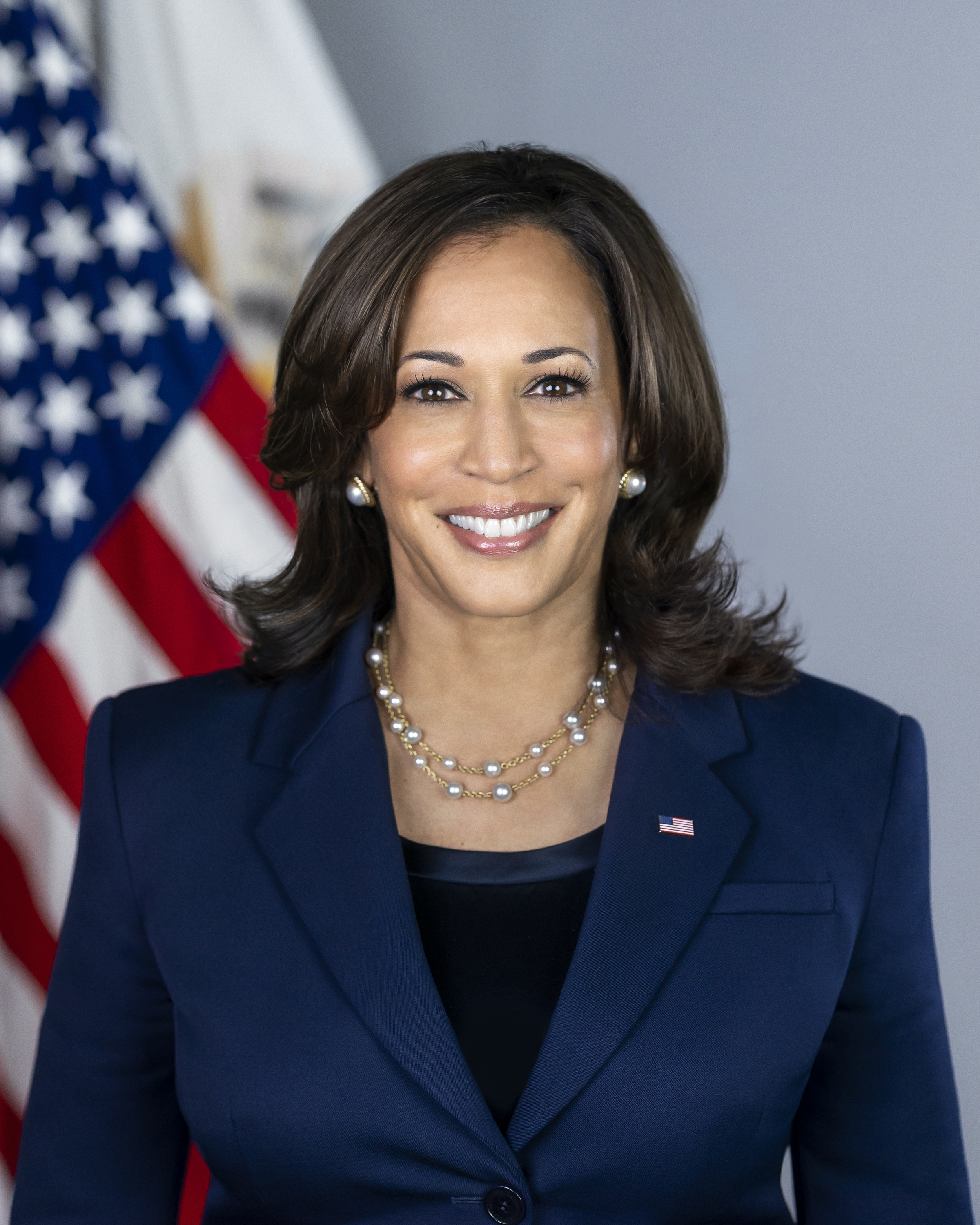
Kamala Harris

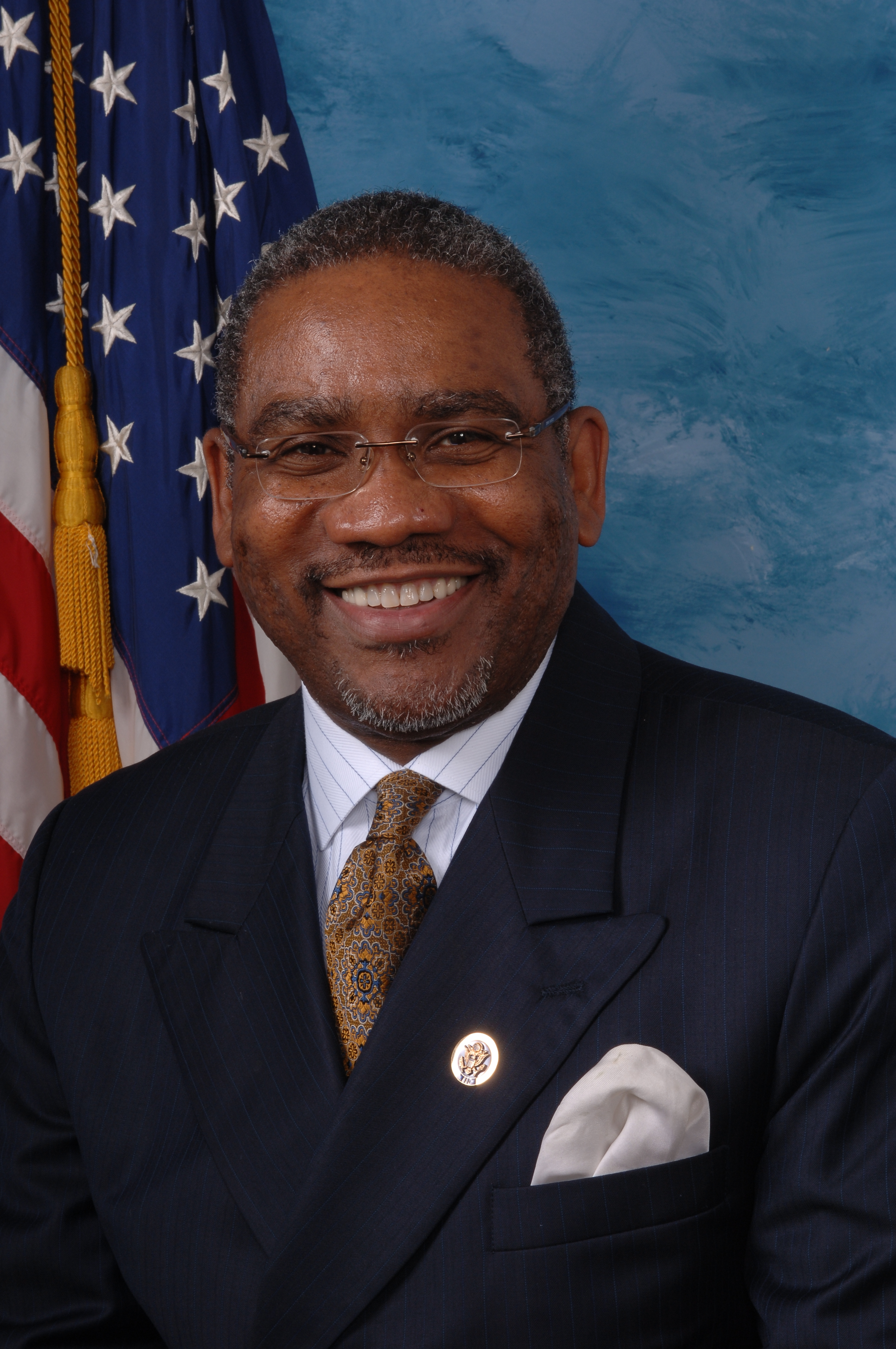
Gregory W. Meeks

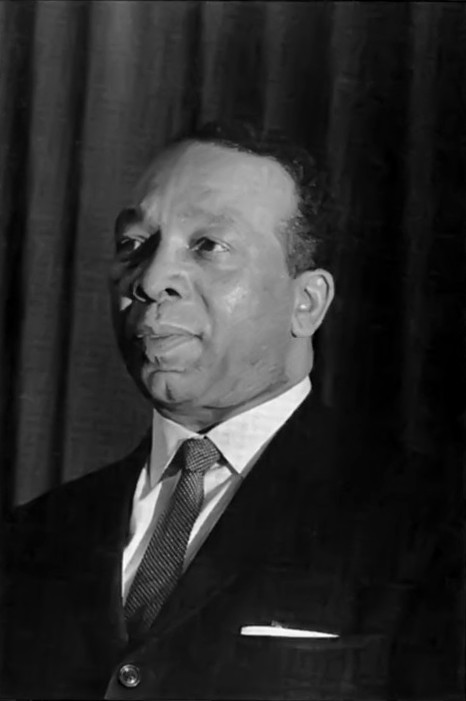
Walter Washington

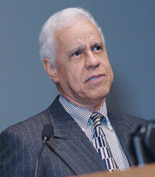
L. Douglas Wilder

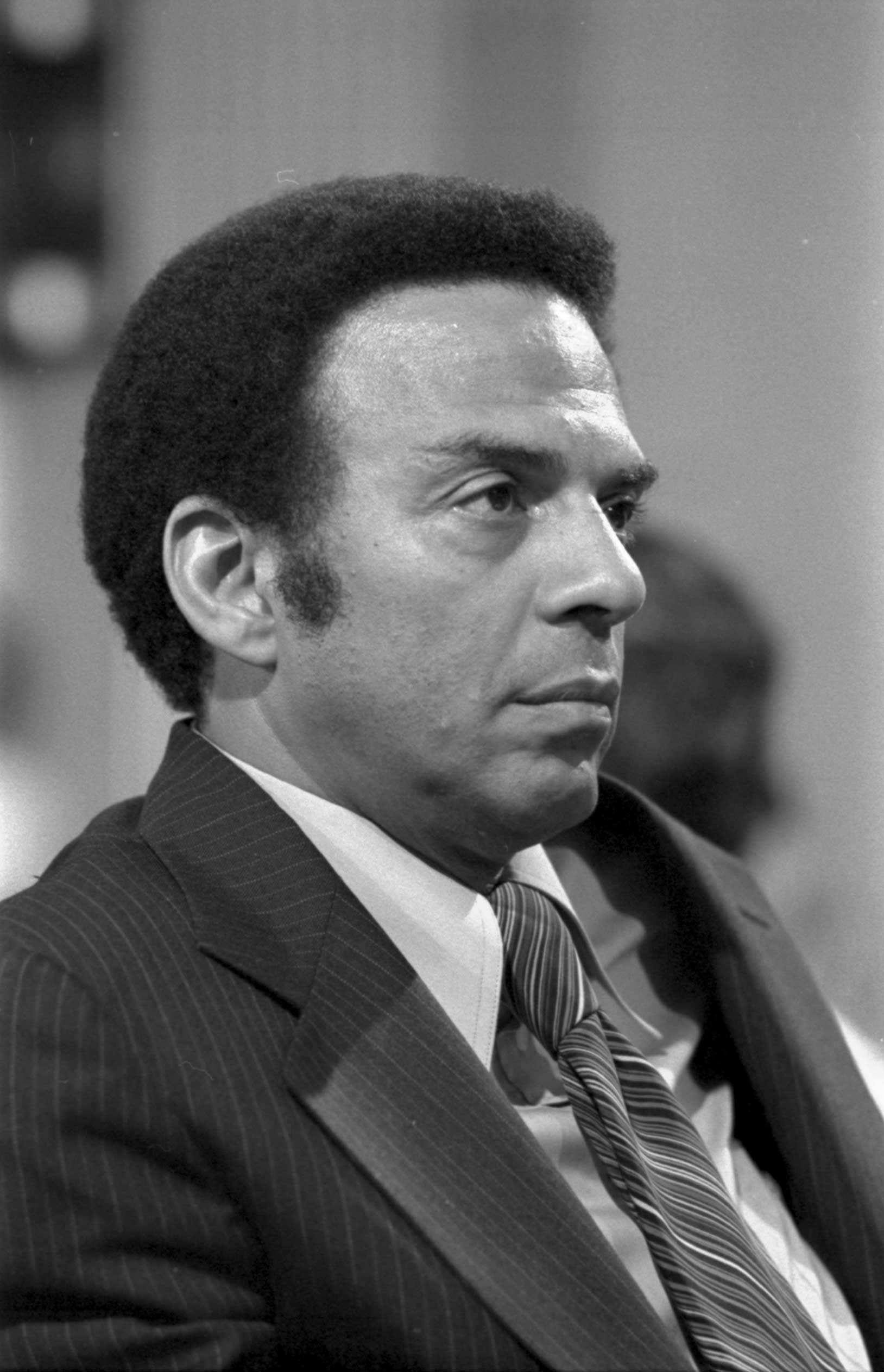
Andrew Young

Name	Class year	Notability	Reference(s)
Archie Alexander		former governor of US Virgin Islands	
Aris T. Allen		former member of Maryland State Senate, first African-American to run for lt. governor of Maryland	
Ras Baraka	1991	mayor of Newark, New Jersey July 1, 2014–	
Sheila Cherfilus-McCormick	2001	member of the U.S. House of Representatives from Florida's 20th district	
Boce W. Barlow Jr.		first African-American to be elected to the Connecticut State Senate	
William V. Bell		mayor of Durham, North Carolina	
Aisha Braveboy		member, Maryland House of Delegates	
Edward Brooke	1941	first African-American elected to the United States Senate	
Hon. Ewart Brown	1968, School of Medicine 1972	premier and Minister of Tourism and Transport of Bermuda	
Gayleatha Brown		ambassador to Benin	
Ralph Bunche		under‑secretary‑general and acting secretary-general of the United Nations; recipient of the Nobel Peace Prize	
Roland Burris	1963 (School of Law)	United States Senator, former State Attorney General and Comptroller, Illinois	
Martell Covington		Pennsylvania state representative	
Elijah Cummings	1973	United States Congress	
David Dinkins	1950	first African-American mayor of New York City (1990–1993)	
Joyce Dinkins	1953	First Lady of New York City (1990–1993)	
Mike Espy		first African-American United States secretary of Agriculture	
Melvin Evans		former governor of the United States Virgin Islands, former delegate from the United States Virgin Islands to the United States House of Representatives	
Nathaniel Exum		member, Maryland State Senate	
Adrian Fenty	1996 (School of Law)	former mayor of Washington, D.C.	
Harold Ford Sr.		former United States representative from Tennessee	
Shirley Franklin		first female and former mayor of Atlanta, Georgia	
Kamala Harris	1986	49th vice president of the United States; first woman, first African-American, and first-elected Asian-American vice president; second African-American woman elected to the United States Senate	
Patricia Roberts Harris	1945	United States Secretary of Health, Education and Welfare, Secretary of Housing and Urban Development, United States ambassador	
William H. Hastie		former governor of US Virgin Islands	
Pamelya Herndon	1975	New Mexico House of Representatives	
Earl F. Hilliard		United States Congress	
Dr. James W. Holley, III, D.D.S.		mayor of Portsmouth, Virginia	
Benjamin Hooks		former executive director of the NAACP	
Lonna Hooks		secretary of state of New Jersey (1994–1998)	
Hutchins F. Inge	(School of Medicine)	first African-American to serve in the New Jersey Senate	
Cheddi Jagan		fourth president, "father of Guyana"	
Jack B. Johnson		former county executive, Prince George's County, Maryland	
Sharon Pratt Kelly	1965	first African-American female mayor of a major city, Washington, D.C.	
Terry Kennedy		influential City of St. Louis politician, former activist and journalist	
John S. Leary	1873	member of the North Carolina House of Representatives; first dean of the law school at Shaw University	
Summer Lee	2015	representative for Pennsylvania's twelfth congressional district in the U.S. House of Representatives	
Peta Lindsay		anti-war activist and candidate for U.S. president with the Party for Socialism and Liberation	
Prince Joel Dawit Makonnen	2015 (School of Law)	member of the Ethiopian Imperial Family	
Gregory W. Meeks		representative for New York's sixth congressional district in the U.S. House of Representatives; chair of the House Foreign Affairs Committee	
Donna Miller		Cook County commissioner	
Imani Oakley	2012	2022 candidate for Congress in New Jersey's 10th congressional district in the U.S. House of Representatives, former legislative director for New Jersey branch of the Working Families Party and political organizer	
James E. O'Hara		member, United States House of Representatives (1883–1887) representing North Carolina	
Willie L. Phillips	2005 (School of Law)	first Black chair of the Federal Energy Regulatory Commission	
Meshea Poore		member of the West Virginia House of Delegates	
Adam Clayton Powell, IV		member of the New York State Assembly; son of former U.S. Representative Adam Clayton Powell Jr.	
Marcia "Cia" Price	2005	member of the Virginia House of Delegates	
Randy Primas	1971	first African-American mayor of Camden, New Jersey (1981–1990)	
Eugene Puryear		anti-war activist; candidate for vice president of the United States with the Party for Socialism and Liberation	
Oliver Randolph	(School of Law)	New Jersey Legislature and lawyer	
Kasim Reed	1991	mayor of Atlanta	
Todd Rutherford		South Carolina state representative	
Roy Schneider	1961	governor of United States Virgin Islands	
Sir Arleigh Winston Scott		first native governor-general of Barbados	
Josiah T. Settle	1872	member of the Mississippi House of Representatives, Memphis lawyer	
Thomas S. Smith		former mayor of Asbury Park, New Jersey who served in the New Jersey General Assembly	
John H. Smythe		United States ambassador to Liberia	
Hobart Taylor Jr.	1941	served in the administrations of Presidents John F. Kennedy and Lyndon B. Johnson; director of the Export–Import Bank of the United States	
Ronald Sapa Tlau		member of Parliament, Rajya Sabha, India representing the state of Mizoram	
Walter Washington	1948 (School of Law)	first elected mayor of Washington, D.C.	
George Henry White	1877	U.S. congressman from North Carolina, 1897–1901	
L. Douglas Wilder	1959 (School of Law)	first elected African-American United States governor, mayor of Richmond, Virginia, 2005–2009	
Harris Wofford		United States senator representing Pennsylvania (1991–95)	
Albert Wynn		first African-American elected to the United States Congress from Prince George's County and Montgomery County in Maryland	
Andrew Young		first African-American United Nations ambassador and former mayor of Atlanta, Georgia	

== Religion ==
Name	Class year	Notability	Reference(s)
Cain Hope Felder	1966	author of The Original African Heritage Study Bible	
Leroy Gilbert		chaplain of the United States Coast Guard	
Louis George Gregory		Hand of the Cause in the Baháʼí Faith	
Vashti Murphy McKenzie		first woman to become a bishop of the African Methodist Episcopal Church	
Anthony J. Motley		religious and community leader from Southeast Washington, D.C.	
Dawud Salahuddin		Muslim terrorist	
Jeremiah Wright	1968	former pastor of Trinity United Church of Christ	

== Science, technology, and medicine ==
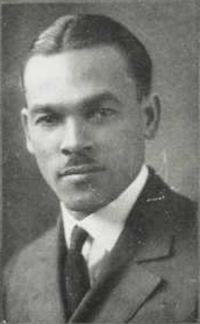
Whittier C. Atkinson

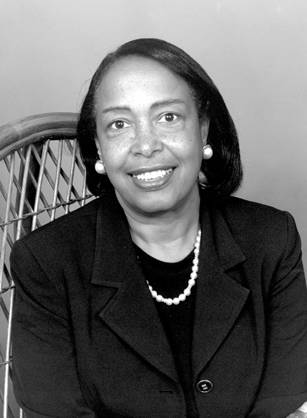
Patricia Bath

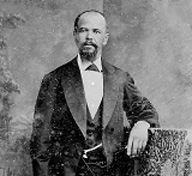
Alexander H. Darnes

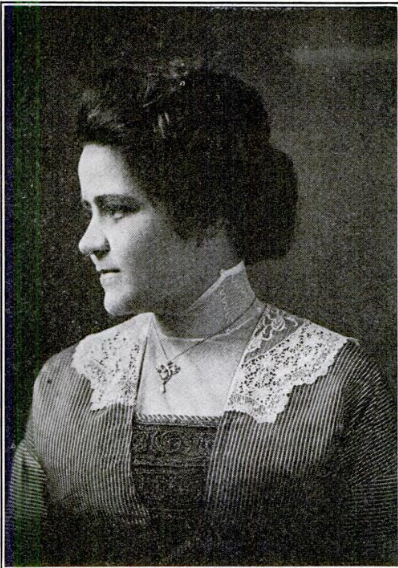
Marie B. Lucas

Name	Class year	Notability	Reference(s)
Dereje Agonafer	1984	elected to the National Academy of Engineering for "contributions to computer-aided electro/thermo/mechanical design and modeling of electronic equipment"	
Camille Wardrop Alleyne	1990 (B.Sc Mechanical Engineering)	NASA Associate Program scientist for the International Space Station	
Whittier C. Atkinson	1925 (Medicine)	physician; first African-American doctor in Chester County, Pennsylvania; founder of Clement Atkinson Memorial Hospital (1936); Howard University Alumnus of the Year (1953)	
Patricia Bath	1968 (Medicine)	ophthalmologist; first African-American woman doctor to receive a patent for a medical invention	
Beth A. Brown	1991	NASA astrophysicist; first African-American woman to earn a doctoral degree from the University of Michigan's Department of Astronomy	
Mary Louise Brown	1898	physician; first African-American woman to receive a wartime medical commission	
DaNa Carlis	2007 (PhD), 2002 (MS), 2000 (BS)	director of National Severe Storms Laboratory	
Mamie Clark	1940	Howard M.A., Columbia Ph.D., psychologist who conducted the "doll research" for the Brown vs. Board of Education case	
Ethelene Crockett	1942	Michigan's first African-American female board-certified OB/GYN	
Linda Y. Cureton	1980	chief executive officer and founder of Muse Technologies, Inc.	
Alexander Darnes	1880	second African-American physician in Florida, first African-American physician in Jacksonville, Florida	
Cheick Modibo Diarra		astrophysicist; former director of education and public outreach, NASA's Mars Exploration Program; former chairman of Microsoft Africa; former acting Malian prime minister (2012)	
Lena Frances Edwards		physician (obstetrics and gynecology) and humanitarian; received U.S. Presidential Medal of Freedom (1964)	
Anna Epps		microbiologist; possibly the first African-American woman with a Ph.D. to lead a medical school	
Roselyn P. Epps	1951, 1955 (MD)	physician (pediatrician and public health physician); received Elizabeth Blackwell Medal (1988), first-elected African-American president of the American Medical Women's Association (1991)	
Aprille Ericsson	1990	aerospace engineer	
Dorothy Celeste Boulding Ferebee		physician (obstetrician) and educator; joined faculty of the Medical School in 1927; founding president of the Women's Institute; director of Medical School's health services, 1949–1968	
Julia R. Hall	1892 (MD)	physician and first female resident of the school's gynaecology clinic	
Roland Jefferson	1950 (Botany)	botanist and expert in flowering cherry trees; first African-American botanist to work at the United States National Arboretum (1956–1987)	
Ernest Everett Just	faculty	biologist, researcher at the Kaiser Wilhelm Institute, and science writer	
Marie B. Lucas	1914	the only woman in her Howard University College of Medicine class, one of the earliest and most successful female physicians in Washington, D.C.	
Melba Roy Mouton	1950	assistant chief of Research Programs at NASA's Trajectory and Geodynamics Division in the 1960s and headed a group of NASA mathematicians called "computers"	
Harry Penn	c. 1931	dentist; first African-American school board member south of the Mason-Dixon Line	
Charles Prudhomme	1935 (MD)	noted psychoanalyst and physician, first African-American to gain elected office (vice-president) in the American Psychiatric Association	
Charles DeWitt Watts	1943 (Medicine)	first African-American board-certified surgeon in North Carolina; founder of Lincoln Community Medical Center	
Frances Cress Welsing	1960	psychiatrist; author of The Isis Papers	
Marguerite Williams	1923	geologist, received B.A. from Howard	
Dr. N. Louise Young	(Medicine)	first African-American woman to work as a licensed physician in Maryland	

== Sports ==
Name	Class year	Notability	Reference(s)
Antoine Bethea		former NFL safety	
Milan Brown		head men's basketball coach at College of the Holy Cross	
Gregg Butler		3-time Canadian Football League all-star and Grey Cup champion, inducted into The Howard University Athletic Hall of Fame in 2014	
Marques Douglas		former NFL defensive end	
Omar Evans		former Canadian Football League defensive end	
Dennis Felton		head men's basketball coach at the University of Georgia	
Dr. Rhadi Ferguson	1997	four-time U.S. National Judo Champion; 2004 Judo Olympian; only African-American male with a Ph.D. to fight on an internationally televised mixed martial arts event; Strikeforce Challengers 13; MMA fighter for Strikeforce	
Pep Hamilton		current offensive coordinator at University of Maryland; former quarterbacks coach for the Chicago Bears	
Gary Harrell		current RB coach at University of Colorado; former head coach of Howard Bison football team; former NFL/WLAF wide receiver (New York Giants and Frankfurt Galaxy); former assistant coach at Texas Southern University	
Nigel Henry		professional soccer player	
Shaka Hislop		goalkeeper for FC Dallas and Trinidad and Tobago national football team who played in the 2006 FIFA World Cup	
Edward P. Hurt		football, basketball and track coach at Morgan State University	
Billy Jenkins		former National Football League defensive back	
Norvel Lee	1952	Olympic gold medal winner	
Thyron Lewis		professional gridiron football player	
Bubba Morton		Major League Baseball player (Detroit Tigers, Milwaukee Braves, California Angels); first African-American to sign with the Detroit Tigers	
Marques Ogden		former NFL offensive lineman	
David Oliver	2005	professional track and field athlete	
Geoff Pope		NFL cornerback (New York Giants)	
Larry Spriggs		former NBA player	
James Terry		American-Israeli basketball player	
Milt Thompson		former Major League Baseball player, hitting coach for the Philadelphia Phillies	
Elijah Thurmon	2000	former professional football player with NFLE Berlin Thunder and CFL Saskatchewan Roughriders, Calgary Stampeders and Montreal Alouettes	
Jay Walker		ESPNU football analyst; NFL quarterback (New England Patriots, 1994; Barcelona Dragons, 1995; Minnesota Vikings, 1996–97), Maryland State Delegate	
Tim Watson		former safety in the NFL; first athlete in the history of the school to be named to the GTEAcademic All-America Team (1992); inducted into the Howard University Athletic Hall of Fame, class of 2005; changed legal name to Tazim Wajid Wajed in 2019	
Tracy White		former NFL linebacker	
Steve Wilson	1979	former NFL defensive back; former head football coach of the Howard University; former head coach at Texas Southern University	

== Notable faculty ==
Name	Department	Notability	Reference
Abelhaleem Hasan Abdelraziq Ashqar	Business	Palestinian; convicted of criminal contempt and obstruction of justice for refusal to testify in a trial related to the funding of Hamas	
E. R. Braithwaite	Writer-in-residence	Guyanese novelist, writer, teacher and diplomat; author of To Sir, With Love; artist-in-residence at Howard beginning in 2002	
Sterling Allen Brown		writer, teacher, literary critic, poet laureate of Washington, D.C.; professor 1929–c.1969	
John Melville Burgess	chaplain	served 1946–1956; later the first African-American to head an Episcopal diocese as diocesan bishop of Massachusetts	
Morris "Moe" Davis	School of Law	Air Force colonel, lawyer and administrative law judge, notably resigned position as Chief Prosecutor of the Guantanamo military commissions, 2005-2007 over concerns about information obtained through waterboarding	
Cecile Hoover Edwards	School of Human Ecology, School of Continuing Education	nutritional researcher and government consultant	
John R. Francis	College of Medicine	obstetrician and clinical lecturer	
Louis Edwin Fry Sr.	School of Architecture	architect, professor; former chair of the architecture department	
Danielle Hairston	College of Medicine	psychiatrist; director of residency training in the Department of Psychiatry	
William Augustus Hazel	School of Architecture	architect, stained glass artist, educator, academic administrator, and civil rights activist	
Michael Hendricks	Clinical psychopharmacology	psychologist, suicidologist and an advocate for the LGBT community	
John Mercer Langston	Law	first African-American dean of Howard Law; Congressman	
George M. Lightfoot	Latin, Classics	instructor 1891–1939, former department chair	
Alain Locke	English	professor, writer, philosopher	
Howard Hamilton Mackey	Architecture	architect, painter, educator, and academic administrator; served as department head, and associate dean	
Ruth Ella Moore	Medical School	first African-American woman to earn a doctorate in bacteriology; faculty member of the Howard University Medical School 1940–1973	
Merze Tate	History	first African-American graduate of Western Michigan College; first African-American woman to attend Oxford; first African-American woman to earn a Ph.D. in government and international relations from Harvard University; one of the first women members of the Department of History at Howard University; expert in diplomatic history; professor 1942–77	
Emory Tolbert	History	African-American historian, archivist and activist; initiated New York Burial Ground Project	
James Lesesne Wells	Art	African-American graphic artist, educator and activist; received a Presidential Citation for Lifelong Contribution to American Art in 1980	
Eric Williams	Political Science	first prime minister of Trinidad and Tobago; instrumental in them gaining their independence; Caribbean historian; Howard professor 1939–1944	
Liz Williamson	Dance	First artist-in-residence with Jacob's Pillow; dancer with Alvin Ailey American Dance Theater	
Abdul–Aziz Yakubu	MathematicsFaculty (Mathematics)	mathematician and department chair at Howard	

== See also ==
- List of people from Washington, D.C.
