= Marie Lucas =

Marie Lucas may refer to:

- Marie B. Lucas (c. 1875–1935), African-American physician
- Marie Seymour Lucas (1850–1921), French-born English painter
- Marie Lucas (1891–1947), musician, arranger and conductor, daughter of Sam Lucas
