= Stephanie Pogue =

American artist (1944–2002)

- Born: Stephanie Elaine Pogue; 1944; Shelby, North Carolina, United States
- Died: 2002 (aged 57–58); Laurel, Maryland, United States
- Education: Syracuse University
- Alma mater: Howard University, Cranbrook Academy of Art
- Known for: Color printing

Stephanie Elaine Pogue (1944–2002) was an American professor, printmaker, artist, and curator. Her artistic interests included the portrayal of women and the human figure.

== Early life and education ==
She was born in Shelby, North Carolina, but was raised in Elizabeth, New Jersey. In junior high school and high school, she was interested in art, ballet, and music. She attended Syracuse University, but felt isolated there as the only black student in a dorm of 250 people. While at Syracuse, she took a life-drawing class for non-majors. After a year at Syracuse, Pogue transferred to Howard University where she studied art. At Howard, she was taught and mentored by notable artists and art historians including James A. Porter, David Driskell, James Lesesne Wells, and Lois Mailou Jones. Her classmates included artists Franklin White, Lou Stovall, and Sylvia Snowden. After receiving her bachelor's degree from Howard University, Pogue graduated from Cranbrook Academy of Art in Bloomfield Hills, Michigan, with her Master of Fine Arts in Printmaking in 1968. Progue continued her art education throughout her career, including studying privately with bookbinder George A. Baer in 1969, studying lithography with Mavis Pusey, studying at the Printmaking Workshop in New York during the summer of 1976, and studying art history at Vanderbilt University.

== Career ==
Pogue was the protegee of artist David Driskell, who was also her undergraduate instructor at Howard University. She worked on the faculty of the Department of Art at Fisk University from 1968 to 1981. While at Fisk, she was influenced by then-Professor Emeritus Aaron Douglas. She was a gallery director and an art professor who taught printmaking, drawing, and art appreciation. While at Fisk, she participated the university's work of documenting African-American artists and having their works purchased by collectors.

In 1981, she left Fisk to work at the University of Maryland as an associate professor of printmaking, drawing, and papermaking. She worked as the Department Chair from 1993 to 1998 and was a member of the Chancellor's Commission on Ethnic Minority Issues. As a recipient of two Fulbright-Hays cross cultural fellowships, granted in 1981 and 1986, Pogue traveled to India to study architecture and to Pakistan to study traditional arts and crafts. These trips greatly impacted her work. In 1982 she received the first of many CAPA awards from the University of Maryland, singled out for her advanced study in color etching techniques. With a strong color sense, a preference for simple geometric (sometimes architectural) shapes and the technical ability to push the traditional boundaries of printmaking, Pogue created a body of work that was exhibited in museum, galleries, and universities nationally and internationally.

== Death ==
Pogue died aged 58 at the Mariner of Laurel health care facility on November 12, 2002, from cardiac arrest.

== Exhibitions and galleries ==
- 1971: Flowers of Form, Studio Museum in Harlem (New York, NY)
- 1971: Contemporary Black Artists in America, Whitney Museum (New York, NY)
- 1976: Migraciones: Una Exhibición de Artistas Gráficos Afro-Americanos, La Tertulia Museum (Cali, Colombia)
- 1981: Forever free: art by African-American women, 1862–1980, Illinois State University (Normal, IL)
- 1982: Clark College Woodruff Library (Atlanta, GA)
- 1983: International Print Exhibit, Taipei City Museum of Fine Arts (Taipei, Taiwan)
- 1985: City Museum (Arondelovac)
- 1987: The Art of Black America in Japan: Afro-American Modernism (Tokyo and Chiba, Japan)
- 1988: Black Women Artists: North Carolina Connections, North Carolina Central University (Durham, NC)
- 1988: Black Arts Festival Exhibition, Spelman College (Atlanta, GA)
- 1989: Castle Gallery (Hyattsville, Maryland)
- 2008: Arabesque: The Art of Stephanie Pogue, Driskell Center, University of Maryland, College Park (College Park, MD)
- 2011: Sculpted, Etched and Cut – Metal Works from the Permanent Collection, Studio Museum in Harlem (New York, NY)
- 2019: Connected: African-American Female Artists and North Carolina, North Carolina Central University (Durham, NC)
