= Charles Prudhomme =

American physician, psychiatrist and psychoanalyst (1908–1988)

Charles Prudhomme, M.D. (1908–1988), an African-American physician and psychoanalyst, entered the field of psychiatry in the 1930s. He served as the vice-president of the American Psychiatric Association in 1970–1971, the first African-American to gain elected office in the organization.

Prudhomme was born in Opelousas, Louisiana. When Prudhomme was three years old, his father developed tuberculosis and the family moved to Denver, Colorado. Along the way, the family stopped in Kansas City, Missouri where Prudhomme and his mother stayed while his father continued to Denver. Prudhomme received his schooling in Kansas City, became a baseball player, and graduated from high school, second in his class.

Prudhomme entered the University of Kansas but remained for only a short time. Due to segregation laws, he was not allowed to take certain courses or use the university's facilities. He applied for and received a scholarship to Howard University, a historically black university, in Washington, DC, and over the next six years he worked while attending the university. He graduated in 1931 and entered the Howard University College of Medicine. He received his M.D. in 1935. He interned in internal medicine at the Freedman's Hospital (now Howard University Hospital) in Washington, DC.

During his years at Howard, medical students attended lectures at St. Elizabeth's Hospital, a federally funded psychiatric hospital for mental patients. Benjamin Karpman, a psychoanalyst and forensic psychiatrist, was a member of the hospital staff, and a professor of psychiatry at Howard. Prudhomme attended his classes and wrote his senior paper on suicide which was published in 1938 in the journal, The Psychoanalytic Review.

Prudhomme planned to do a psychiatric residency at St. Elizabeth's but he was told that federal legislation, which established the hospital in 1855, enforced segregation. In 1937, he obtained a fellowship at the University of Chicago but was dismayed to learn that he was assigned to work at the Provident Hospital, which provided medical care to black people. He returned to Washington, DC to work at St. Elizabeth's, but he was unsuccessful.

In 1940, using his contacts with then U.S. Senator Harry Truman, arrangements were made for Prudhomme to go to Tuskegee, Alabama, and work at the Veterans Administration hospital for black veterans. He advocated for the desegregation of the VA hospital in 1948. He met many black psychiatrists who had been trained in Boston by Solomon Carter Fuller (1872-1953), the first American black psychiatrist. Prudhomme remained at Tuskegee until 1943 when the U.S. Army transferred him to Howard University to head the Army Specialized Training Unit. While at Howard, he registered at the Washington School of Psychiatry to study and train under Dr. Frieda Fromm-Reichmann, a German psychiatrist. Prudhomme was admitted to the Washington Psychoanalytic Society in 1958, but only after he was required to complete additional training.

Prudhomme's writings discuss his experiences with racism, which he encountered throughout his professional career.

Prudhomme practiced psychoanalysis in Washington, DC for many years and taught at Howard University. He often pointed to the importance of cultural patterns in the practice of psychiatry.

He was a life fellow of the American Psychoanalytic Association.

He was married to the former Rhetta Wilson, who died in 1987. Prudhomme died at home following a heart attack, March 1, 1988.

== Works ==
Prudhomme, Charles. "The Problem of Suicide in the American Negro," The Psychoanalytic Review 25(2) (April 1938): 187–204.

Prudhomme, Charles. "Epilepsy and Suicide," The Journal of Nervous and Mental Disease 94(6) (Dec. 1941): 722–731.

Prudhomme, Charles. "Reflections on Racism," American Journal of Psychiatry 127(6) (Dec. 1970): 815–817.

Prudhomme, Charles, and D.F. Musto. "Historical Perspectives on Mental Health and Racism in the United States," in Bertram S. Brown, Bernard M. Kramer, and Charles Vert Willie, eds., Racism and Mental Health: Essays (Pittsburgh: University of Pittsburgh Press, 1973).
