= Christopher James Bonner =

American academic

Christopher James Bonner is an American academic who specializes in the African diaspora and race studies, and the author of Remaking the Republic: Black Politics and the Creation of American Citizenship (2020). He teaches at the University of Maryland, in the history department.

== Biography ==
Bonner, from Chesapeake, Virginia, got a B.A. from Howard University and a PhD from Yale University. He teaches at the University of Maryland, in the history department.

Bonner is the author of the monograph Remaking the Republic: Black Politics and the Creation of American Citizenship, published in 2020 by the U of Pennsylvania P.
