= James Lesesne Wells =

American painter (1902–1993)

- Born: November 2, 1902; Atlanta, Georgia, U.S.
- Died: January 20, 1993 (aged 90); Washington D.C.
- Education: Lincoln University in Pennsylvania; Columbia University; National Academy of Design
- Occupations: Graphic artist, educator
- Known for: Printmaking, Painting
- Notable work: American Fantasy (1929)
- Movement: Harlem Renaissance

James Lesesne Wells (November 2, 1902 – January 20, 1993) was an African American graphic artist, print-maker, and painter associated with the Harlem Renaissance. He was an influential art professor at Howard University from 1929 to 1968 and is considered a pioneer in modern art education.

== Early life and education ==
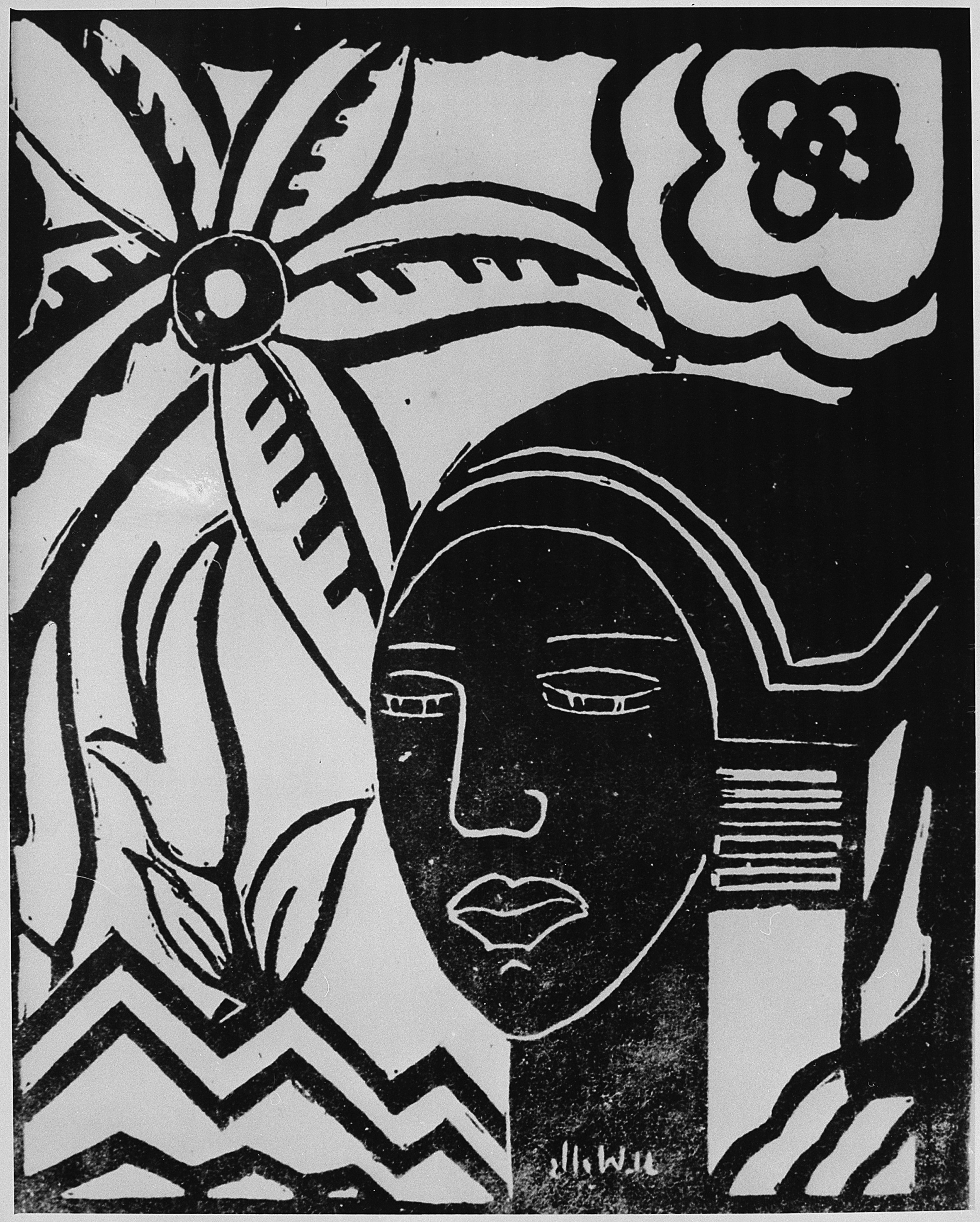
African Fantasy, woodcut, 1929

Wells was born on November 2, 1902, in Atlanta, Georgia, in the United States. His father, Frederick W. Wells, was a Baptist minister while his mother, Hortensia Ruth Lesesne Wells, taught school. When he was young, his family moved to Florida.

Wells's first experience in art was assisting his mother with her kindergarten art class. When Wells was thirteen years old, he won two prizes in art at the Florida State Fair, a first prize in painting and a second prize in woodworking. Wells attended Lincoln University of Pennsylvania for one year before transferring to Teachers College, Columbia University in New York City, where he earned a bachelor's degree in art education. He subsequently studied art at the National Academy of Design.

== Career ==
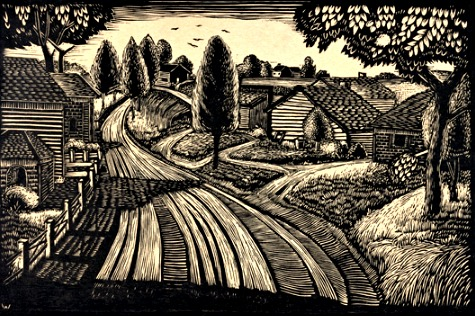
Farmlands, woodcut, WPA commission, 1935–1943

Early in his career, Wells was primarily a graphic artist. He worked with block printing, lithography, and etching. He created graphic illustrations for books, journals, and other publications, including illustrations for a poetry collection of Marianne Moore and history periodicals of the Association for the Study of Afro-American Life and History. In 1929, Wells was hired as a crafts instructor at Howard University in Washington, D.C. He taught block printing, ceramics, clay modeling and sculpture. Two years later, Wells convinced Howard University's College of Fine Arts to offer classes in linoleum printmaking. Wells was known for his inventive and modern printmaking. He was an influential teacher and mentor to young artists during his career, including sculptor Elizabeth Catlett and print-maker Stephanie Pogue. A devout Christian, he often used biblical scenes and imagery in his work. Wells established the arts and crafts program at Utopia Children's Center in New York City where Jacob Lawrence became a student of Charles Alston.

After 1931, Wells gained recognition as a painter. Many of his paintings were shown at the Phillips Memorial Gallery, included in the William Harmon Foundation traveling exhibitions, and exhibited in many museums and art galleries worldwide. His early work was inspired by German Expressionist woodcuts. He also was fascinated with abstract cubism and African sculpture. During the Great Depression, Wells was director of a summer arts program in a Harlem nightclub. His art assistants included Charles Alston, Jacob Lawrence, and Georgette Seabrooke.

In the early 1930s, influenced by the widespread economic hardship of the Great Depression, Wells decided to focus on producing art that was affordable and accessible to a wider range of audiences. From that point on, he created art that was reproducible: lithographs, woodcuts, and etchings. His new work reflected his interest in the African American experience, and often portrayed workers from diverse cultural and ethnic backgrounds.

After World War II, Wells spent a year working in Stanley William Hayter's Atelier 17 studio in New York City. During the 1950s, Wells continued to teach art at Howard University and continued to create art and exhibit his work. Wells was actively involved in the civil rights movement of the 1960s, protesting racially segregated lunch counters and advocating for hiring Black police officers in New York City. He directed the 135th Street Branch of the New York Public Library's summer art workshops, teaching and mentoring prominent African American artists like Jacob Lawrence and Charles Alston.

Wells was a prominent artist in Washington, D.C., for sixty years. He retired from teaching in 1968 but continued to work into his eighties, making bolder art, including prints cut in color linoleum. In 1973, Fisk University held a solo exhibit of his work. In 1980, he was awarded the Presidential Citation for Lifelong Contribution to American Art by President Jimmy Carter. In 1986, a retrospective exhibition of his work was held at the Washington Project for the Arts. The exhibition was titled "Sixty Years in Art". Wells received the Living Legend Award at the National Black Arts Festival in Atlanta in 1991.

Wells died of heart failure at Howard University Hospital in Washington, D.C., on January 20, 1993, at the age of 90.

== Awards ==
- Harmon Foundation, gold medal, Flight into Egypt, 1931
- Harmon Foundation, bronze medal for most representative work in black and white, "1933 Exhibition of the Work of Negro Artists" group exhibition, 1933
- Smithsonian Institution, first prize, Religious Art Exhibition, 1958
- Presidential Citation for Lifelong Contribution to American Art, 1980
