= Rollin Williams =

American educator

Rollin Charles Williams
- Williams in 1943
- Born: March 19, 1922; Kansas City, Missouri, US
- Died: September 24, 2012 (aged 90); Waterford, Connecticut, US
- Education: Howard University (BS); Boston University (MS)
- Occupation: Professor of Social Work
- Employer(s): University of Connecticut; Norwich State Hospital

Rollin Charles Williams (March 19, 1922 – September 24, 2012) was an American educator who served as Professor of Social Work at the University of Connecticut from 1957 to 1985. A World War II veteran, Williams was the university's first African American professor.

== Life and career ==
Williams was born in Kansas City, Missouri, to parents Rollin and Ruby Williams on March 19, 1922. He was raised by his maternal grandparents in Tulsa, Oklahoma, where he was high school valedictorian, solo violinist in the school orchestra, and Oklahoma state typewriting champion. He earned a Bachelor of Science degree from Howard University and then served in the US Army from 1943 to 1946, starting out as a clerk typist and concluding his military career as a sergeant major in personnel. While stationed at Camp Clipper, California, during World War II, Williams spent weekends in Los Angeles and once sat next to Lena Horne at a party. He went on to earn a Master of Science in social work from Boston University in 1949.

After earning his degree, Williams worked as a psychiatric social worker at US Department of Veterans Affairs hospitals in Springfield, Massachusetts, and Northport, New York. In 1952, he became the first supervisor of psychiatric services at Norwich State Hospital. After two years of overseeing placements of students from UConn's School of Social Work, located in Hartford, Williams was recruited to join the university's faculty in 1957. He took a one-year leave of absence in 1967–68 to pursue doctoral studies at Columbia University School of Social Work.

Williams taught at UConn for almost thirty years and was the university's first African American professor. Promoted from assistant to associate professor by 1974, Williams served stints as interim dean and as director of the school's admissions office. In retirement, he held the rank of professor emeritus. The Rollin Williams/Y.C. Wu Scholarship for doctoral students at the School of Social Work was established partly in his honor.

Following the passage of affirmative action laws in the 1960s, Williams received job offers from five other universities eager to recruit African American faculty. He declined these offers, commenting in a 2012 interview that "I wouldn't take those jobs because UConn took me when it didn't have to." Williams left a substantial bequest to the university in his will.

== Personal life ==
During his academic career and retirement, Williams lived in Salem, Connecticut. He served on the Dime Savings Bank board of directors. An aficionado of opera, classical music, and rhythm and blues, Williams played the organ and oboe in addition to the violin and co-founded the Connecticut Early Music Society. He dressed stylishly and drove a Mercedes car. He never married and had no children. His friends included poets and musicians such as William Meredith, Meredith's partner Richard Harteis, James Merrill, Kent Tritle, and Tritle's partner Arthur Fiacco.

Williams died of congestive heart failure at a nursing home in Waterford, Connecticut, on September 24, 2012.
