= Marie B. Lucas =

African-American physician

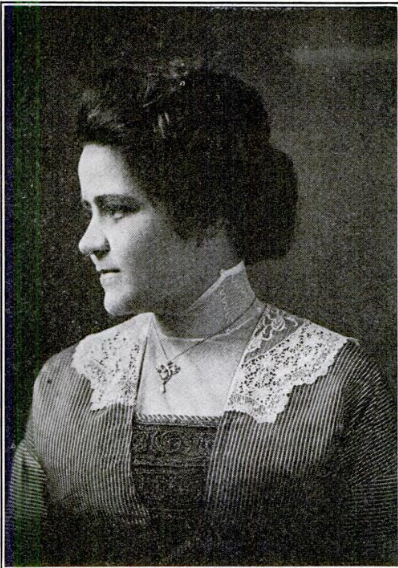
A portrait of Marie B. Lucas, which accompanied an article in The Crisis on her graduation as the only woman in her class at Howard University College of Medicine.

Marie Bernadette Lucas (c. 1875 – February 23, 1935) was an African American physician, one of the earliest women to practice medicine in Washington, D.C.

As a young woman, she worked in public schools in Washington, having studied at the Miner Normal School, a teachers' college for African American students. She married M. Grant Lucas, who at one time was principal of Blanche Kelso Bruce Elementary School and the Wormley School. The couple had one son, in 1907.

Lucas studied medicine at Howard University, a historically Black university, that from its founding accepted both male and female students. While at Howard, she was awarded the George N. Perry prize for her high grades in pediatrics, and she was class secretary for her program. She graduated with an M.D. in 1914, the only woman to graduate from the program that year, and was subsequently licensed to practice medicine in the District of Columbia. She would go on to practice medicine for twenty years.

After graduating, she joined the staff of physicians at the Freedmen's Hospital, which is now Howard University Hospital. She worked in the hospital's pediatrics department. She was the founding chairwoman of the Harriet Tubman Branch of the local Red Cross. Later, she was examining physician for the Teachers' Benefit and Annuity Association.

By the early 1920s, she was one of just nine women medical doctors in Washington, D.C., and she was described at the time as "the most active and successful" of them. Her practice was considered lucrative at the time.

Having begun her career as a teacher, Lucas remained involved in various educational efforts, both medical and non-medical. She lectured on hygiene at what was then the Maryland Normal and Industrial School at Bowie, now Bowie State University, as well as at various conferences and schools. She was also involved in the Frelinghuysen University, an education initiative for Black students, as a trustee at the Hannah Stanley Opportunity School, which was within the Frelinghuysen system. Additionally, she was a longtime member of the Public School Community Center Council.

Lucas's son became a physician. She died in 1935 at her home on 15th Street NW in Washington. She was 60 years old.
