= Waseda Campus =

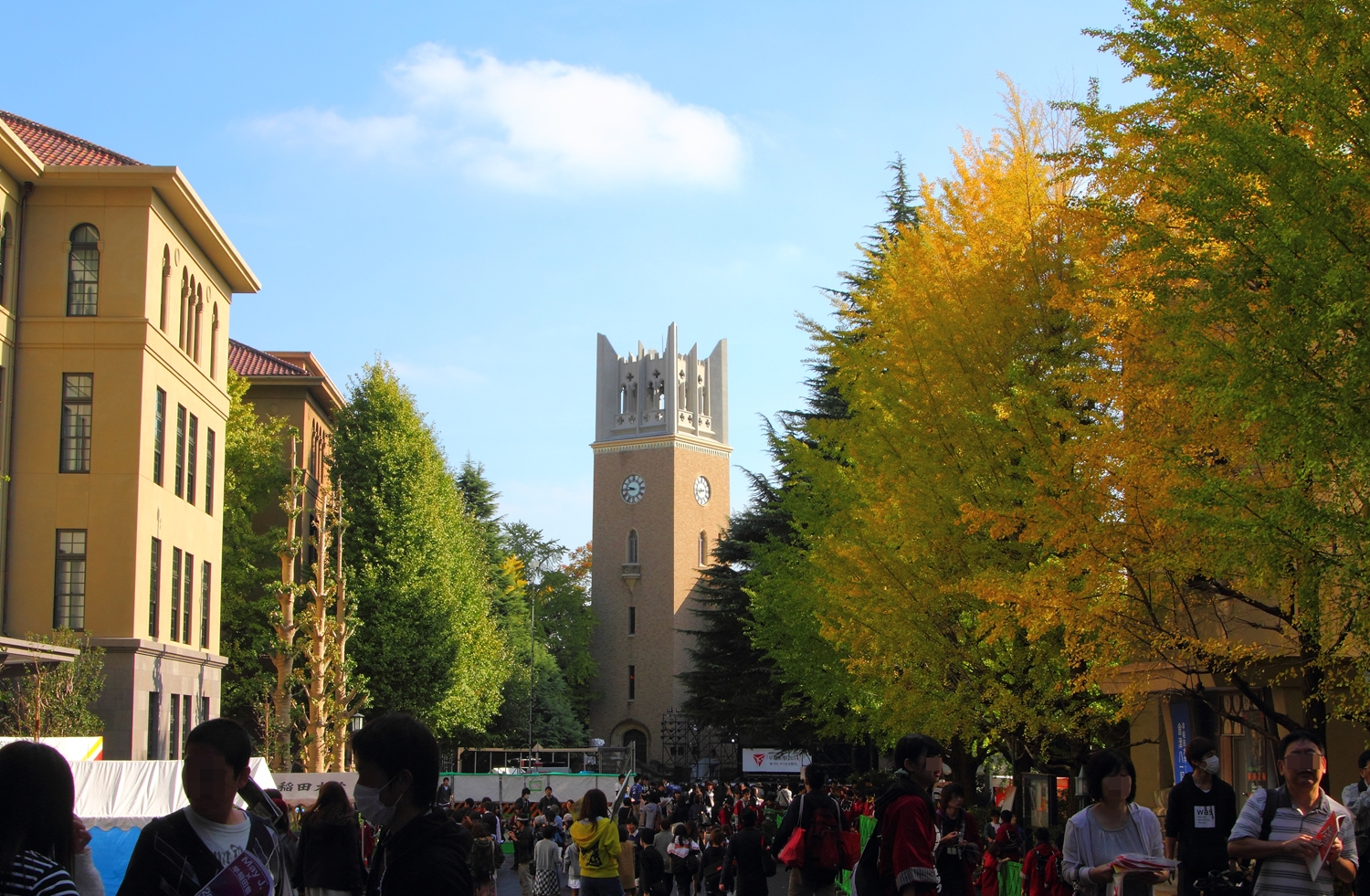
Waseda campus

Map of Waseda, Tokyo with the campuses of Waseda University labelled

The Waseda University Waseda Campus (Japanese: 早稲田大学早稲田キャンパス, Hepburn: Waseda Daigaku Waseda Kyanpusu) is the primary campus of Waseda University. Located at 1-6-1 Nishi-Waseda, Shinjuku ward, Tokyo, it is sometimes referred to as the main campus (本キャン, hon-kyan).

The Waseda Campus is the site where Tokyo Professional School (東京專門學校, Tokyo Senmon Gakko), the predecessor to Waseda University, was founded and currently serves as the university's main campus. The campus grounds house Okuma Auditorium, the faculty buildings for the Schools of Political Science and Economics, Law, Commerce, International Liberal Studies, Social Sciences, and Education, as well as various research facilities. The total site area is 124,671 square meters.

== History ==
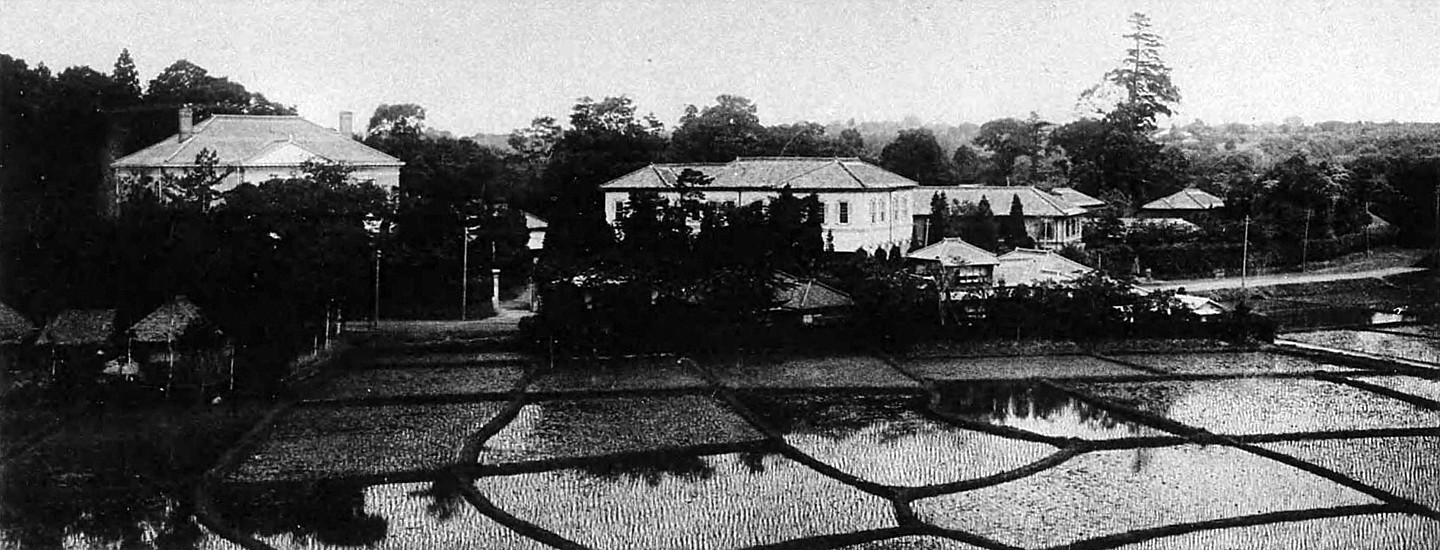
Tokyo Professional School in 1890

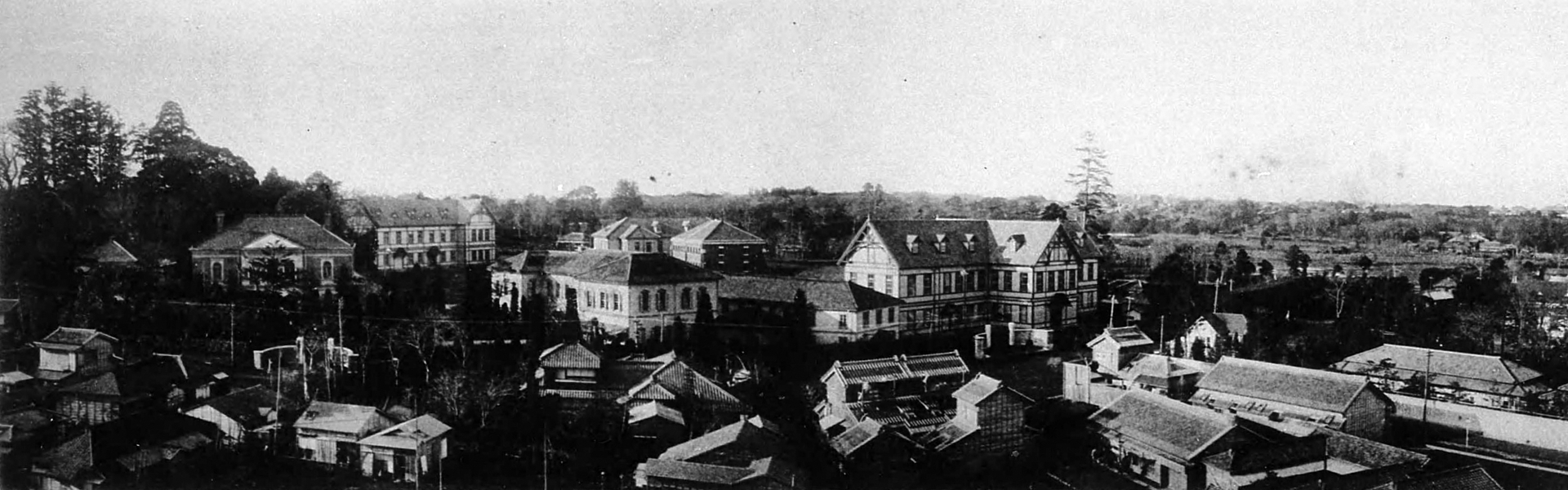
Waseda University in 1902

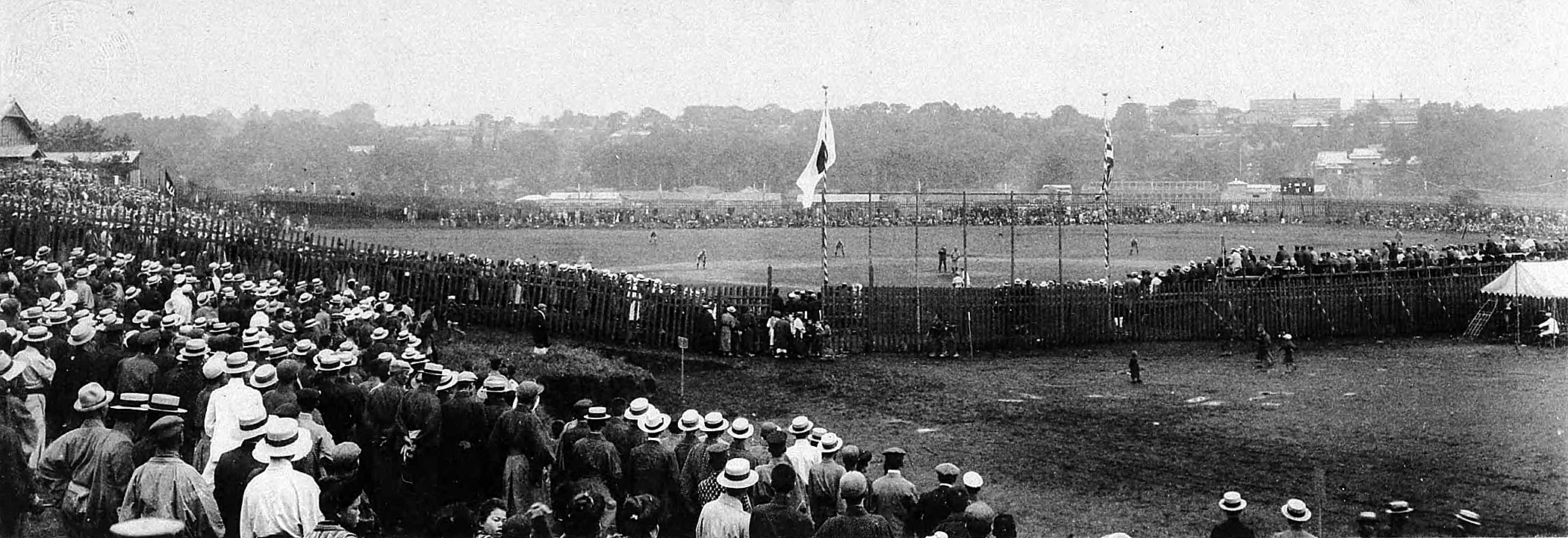
Totsuka Baseball Stadium around 1908

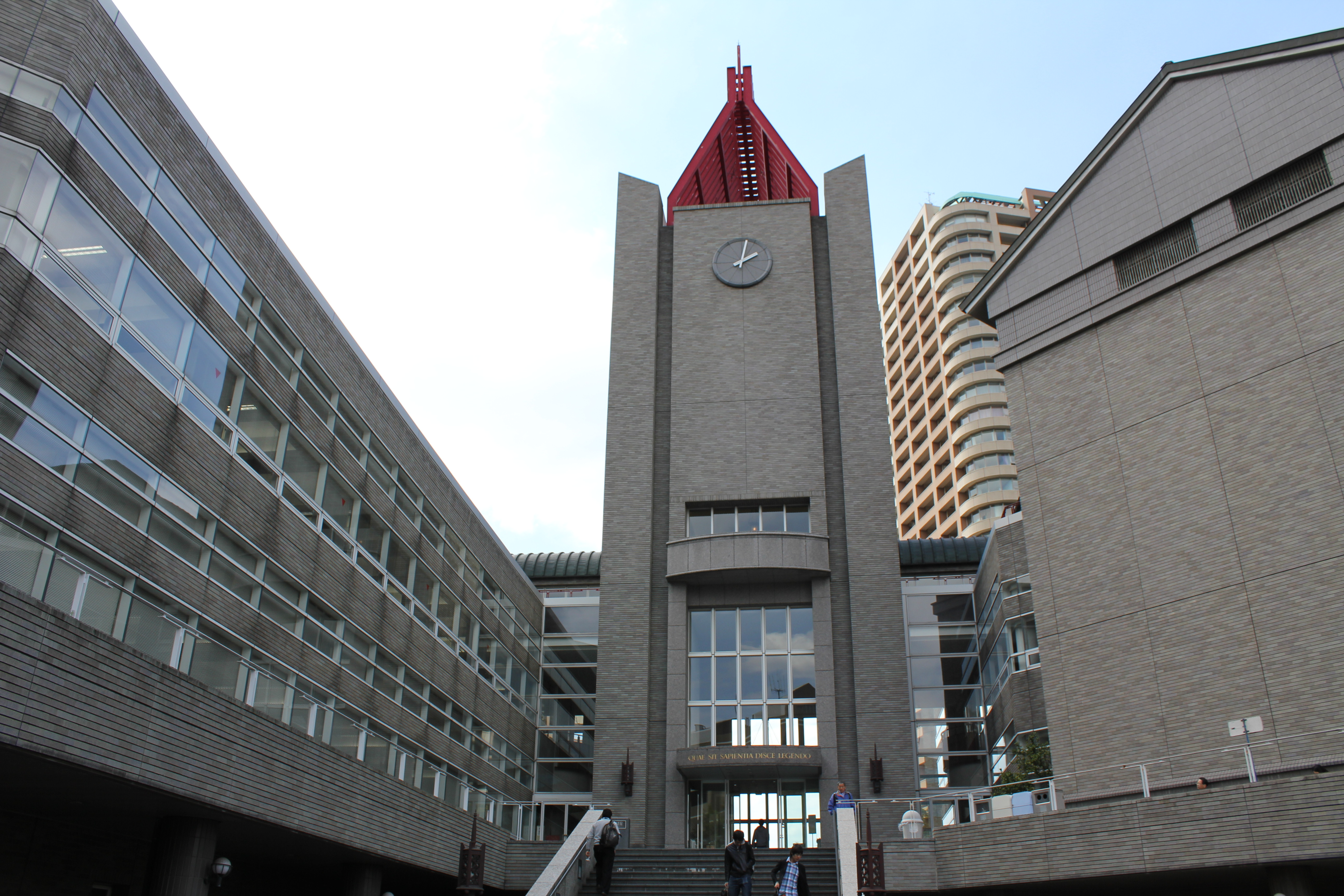
Waseda University Library

- 1882 - Tokyo Professional School opened.

At the time the school opened, the site covered approximately 1,500 tsubo—an area just large enough to accommodate the southern half of the current main gate and the greater part of Building No. 2.

- 1884 - Ōkuma Shigenobu moves his main residence from Kikobashi, Iida Town to Waseda University.
- 1887 - The red brick auditorium was completed with a donation from Ōkuma Shigenobu.
- 1897 - Shichitokudo (gymnasium) opened. Okuma attended the 15th anniversary celebration.
- 1901 - Electric lights were installed in classrooms and the school gate.
- 1902 - Name changed to Waseda University. Library completed. Totsuka Stadium opened.
- 1907 - Okuma announced that he would donate the university grounds. Okuma statue (first generation) erected.
- 1911 - The Imperial Gift Memorial Hall is completed.
- 1922 - Second High School building (formerly Building 13) completed (demolished in 1998).
- 1923 - The old auditorium collapsed in the Great Kanto Earthquake.
- 1925 - Library (currently Building 2) completed. Student hall opens.
- 1927 - Okuma Auditorium completed.
- 1928 - Theater Museum completed.
- 1931 - The Faculty of Letters building (formerly Building 8) was completed (demolished in 2002).
- 1932 - Statue of Okuma (second generation, current) and Sanae Takada statue erected.
- 1933 - Headquarters building (south side of former Building 3) completed (demolished in 2011). Budokan opens.
- 1934 - Completion of the Government and Law School Building (north side of former building No. 3) (demolished in 2011). Pathways within the campus were paved.
- 1935 - Completion of the Specialised and Higher Normal School buildings (currently Building 1). The gateposts and gates were removed from the main entrance of the university (it became a gate without a gate).
- 1936 - The Faculty of Science and Engineering Laboratory (Department of Applied Chemistry) is completed.
- 1937 - The Faculty of Science and Engineering Laboratory (Department of Mining and Metallurgy) is completed.
- 1938 - The School of Commerce building (formerly Building 11) was completed (demolished in 2006). Purchased Kansenen.
- 1945 - Imperial Gift Memorial Hall and other buildings were destroyed by air raids.
- 1950 - A common classroom building (currently Building 7) is completed on the site of the Imperial Gift Memorial Hall.
- 1952 - The common classroom building (currently Building 10) is completed.
- 1962 - The Faculty of Letters moves to the newly established Toyama Campus.
- 1963 - Signed a land exchange agreement between Mizu Inari Shrine and Kansenen.
- 1966 - Building No. 15 completed.
- 1967 - Building 16 (Faculty of Education) completed. The sale of Kansenen was completed.
- 1969 - Building No. 9 completed.
- 1970 - Changed the name display of buildings and school buildings.
- 1971 - Building 29 (currently Building 17-3) is completed.
- 1981 - Sports and Welfare Facility (Building 17) completed (on the site of the former Budokan).
- 1987 - Abe Stadium (formerly Totsuka Stadium) closed.
- 1990 - Okuma Garden House completed.
- 1991 - Academic Information Centre (Central Library/International Conference Hall) opens.
- 1998 - Building 14 completed.
- 2005 - New Building No. 8 completed.
- 2008 - Name changed from "Nishi-Waseda Campus" to "Waseda Campus". (Note: The following year, 2009, the "Okubo Campus" became the "Nishi-Waseda Campus".)
- 2009 - New Building 11 completed.
- 2014 - New Building No. 3 completed.
- 2015 - The main gate is made barrier-free.
- 2018 - Waseda University History Museum opens (1st floor, Building 1).
- 2021 - Waseda University Museum of International Literature (Haruki Murakami Library) opens.
- 2022 - The former Abe Stadium site is selected as one of Japan's 150 sacred and famous baseball sites.

== Facilities ==
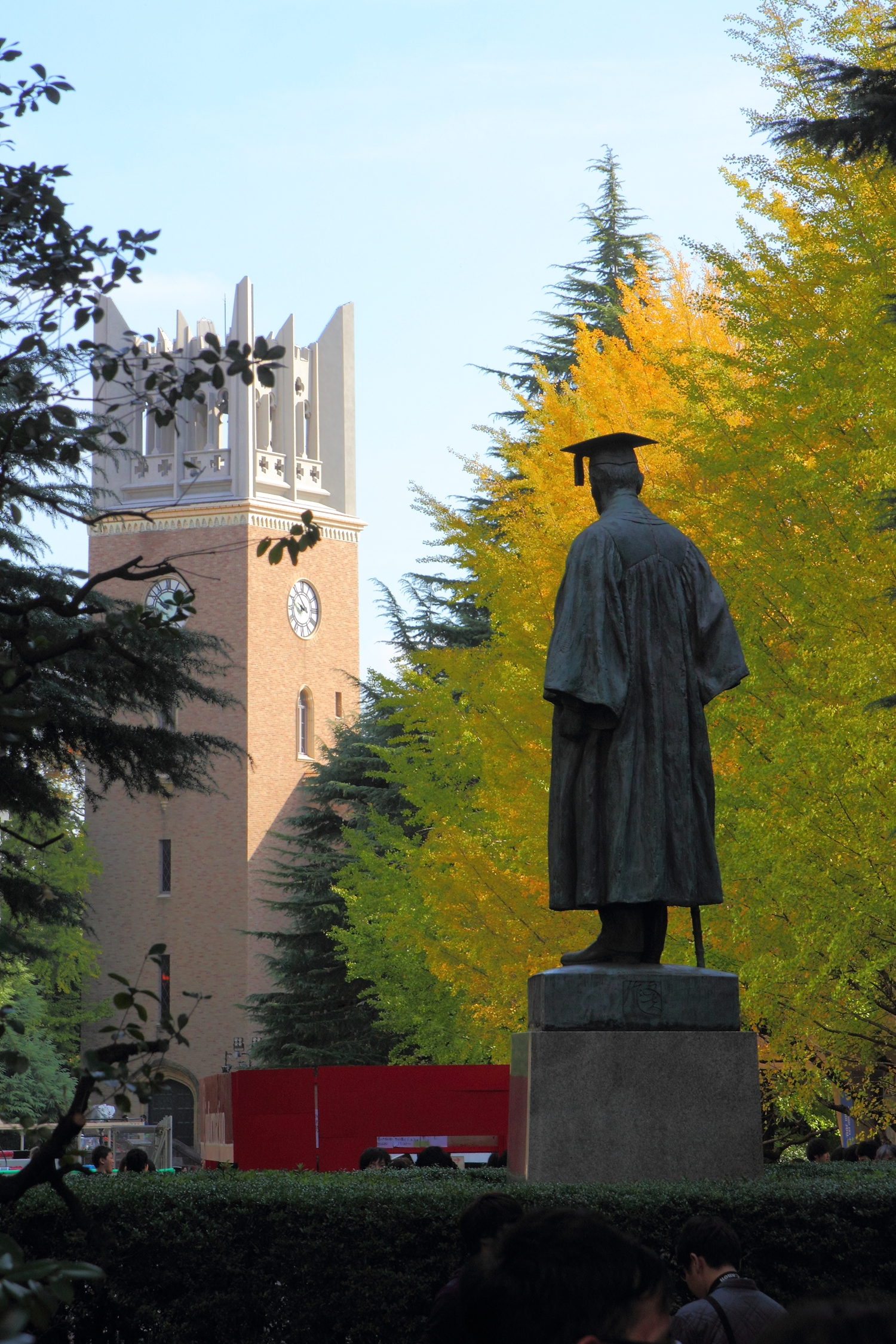
Statue of Shigenobu Okuma, facing Okuma Auditorium.

- Building 1 (Admissions Centre, Institute for Contemporary Political and Economic Affairs, History Museum)
- Building 2 (Aizu Museum, Sanae Takata Memorial Library, Okuma Memorial Room)
- Building 3 (School of Political Science and Economics)
- Building 4 (The Waseda International House of Literature, commonly known as the Haruki Murakami Library)
- Building 5 (Tsubouchi Memorial Theatre Museum)
- Building 6 (School of Education)
- Building 7 (General Classrooms)
- Building 8 (School of Law)
- Building 9 (General Classrooms, Organization for Asian Studies)
- Building 10 (General Classrooms)
- Building 11 (School of Commerce / School of International Liberal Studies)
- Building 12 (School of Social Sciences)
- Building 14 (School of Social Sciences / School of Education)
- Building 15 (General Classrooms)
- Building 16 (School of Education)
- Building 17 (Gymnasium, Co-op Life Centre)
- Building 17-2 (Kansen-ryo Dormitory)
- Building 17-3 (Grand-zaka Cafeteria, Faculty and Staff Union)
- Building 18 (Waseda University Library, Masaru Ibuka Memorial Hall, International Conference Centre)
- Building 19 (Graduate School of Asia-Pacific Studies)
- Building 19-2 (Waseda Legal Clinic)
- Building 19-3 (Incubation Promotion Office)
- Building 20 (Okuma Garden House)
- Building 21 (Okuma Auditorium)
- Building 22 (International Centre)
- Building 23 (Extension Centre)
- Building 23-5 (UNI.SHOP & CAFE) 125)
- Building 24 (Centre for Distance Learning and Education)
- Building 25 (Okuma Garden House)
- Building 25-2 (Health Centre)
- Building 26 (Okuma Memorial Tower)
- Building 27 (Ono Azusa Memorial Hall)
- Building 27-8 (Office for the Promotion of Social Collaboration)
- Building 28 (Daycare Centre: "Pobbins Nursery Waseda")
- Building 29 (Language Classrooms Building)
- Building 29-2 (Extension Centre Annex)
- Building 29-6 (Waseda University Automobile Club)
- Building 29-7 (Graduate School of Global Information and Telecommunication Studies)
- Building 99 (Ikuo Hirayama Volunteer Centre)
- Building 120 (Research and Development Centre / Former Waseda Jitsugyo School Building)
- Building 120-3 (Research Institute for Environment and Society)
- Building 120-4 (Research Strategy Centre)
- Building 120-5 (Research Organization for Nano & Life Innovation)
- Okuma Garden
- Waseda Little Theatre "Dramakan"

== Access ==
- Tōzai Line: Waseda Station (5 minute walk)
- Fukutoshin Line: Nishi-waseda Station (17 minute walk)
- Yamanote Line・ Seibu Shinjuku Line: Takadanobaba Station (20 minute walk)
- Toden Arakawa Line: Waseda Station (5 minute walk)
