= Waseda Law School =

Law school at Waseda University in Japan

Waseda Law School (Japanese: 早稲田大学大学院法務研究科 わせだだいがく だいがくいんほうむけんきゅうか）is the law school of Waseda University. It is among the top seven law schools that constituted the Leading Law School (Japanese: 先導的法科大学院, LL7) along with the law schools of University of Tokyo, Kyoto University, Hitotsubashi University, Keio University, Chuo University, and Kobe University.

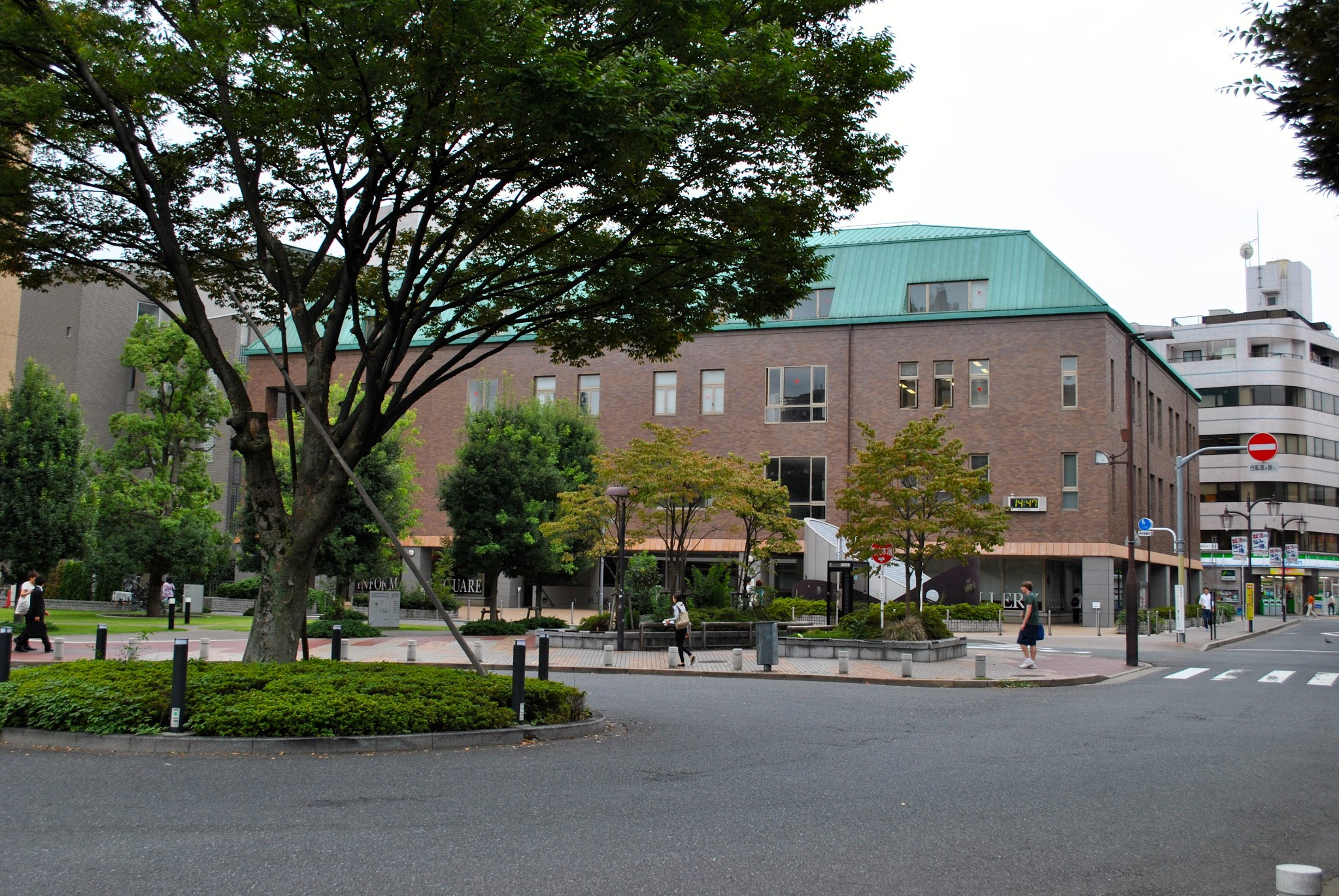
The building that housed Waseda Law School

== Basics ==
- Established in 2004
- Dean: MATSUMURA, Kazunori (松村和徳)
- Degree conferred: Juris Doctor
- Semester starts every April
- Duration of the study: 3 years; 2 years for the accelerated program

== Pass rate for bar exam ==
Waseda Law School (Graduate School of Law) was 9th out of all the 74 law schools in Japan according to the ratio, 63.95%, of the successful graduates who passed the bar examinations from 2007 to 2017 on average.

In 2020, Waseda Law School became 12th out of all the 72 law schools in Japan according to the ratio, 36.06%, of the successful graduates who passed the bar examination (national average : 39.16%).
