= Okuma Auditorium =

Waseda University Ōkuma Memorial Hall
- 早稲田大学大隈記念講堂
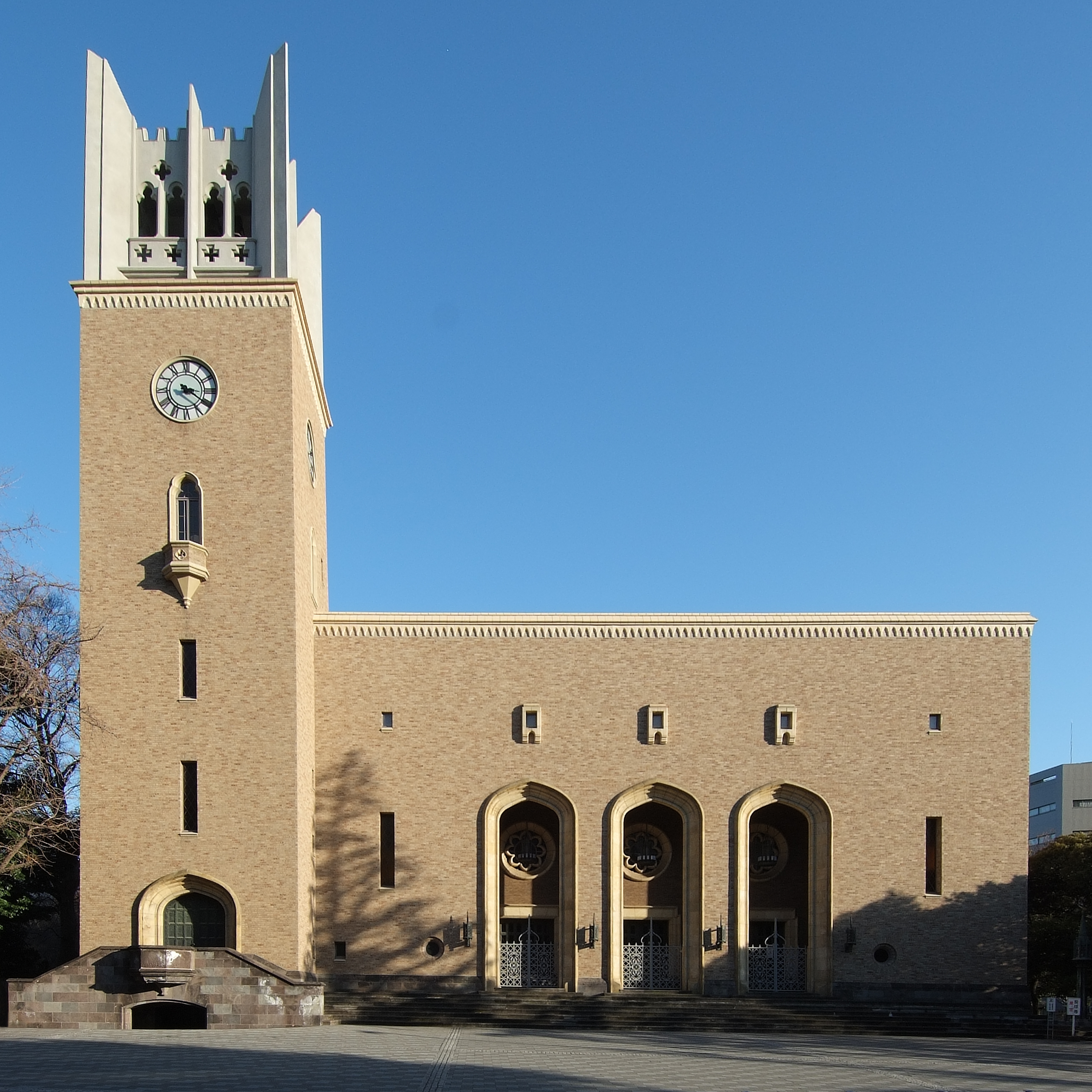
- Alternative names: Waseda University Ōkuma Memorial Hall

General information
- Type: Auditorium
- Architectural style: Tudor Gothic
- Classification: Important Cultural Property
- Location: 1-104 Totsuka-chō, Shinjuku, Tokyo, Japan
- Coordinates: 35°42′32″N 139°43′18″E
- Named for: Ōkuma Shigenobu
- Construction started: February 11, 1926
- Construction stopped: October 20, 1927
- Opened: 1927
- Owner: Waseda University

Height
- Height: 37.5 metres (123.0 ft)

Design and construction
- Architects: Kōichi Satō; Takeo Satō
- Structural engineer: Tachū Naitō
- Main contractor: TODA Corporation

The Ōkuma Auditorium (大隈講堂, Ōkuma kōdō), officially the Waseda University Ōkuma Memorial Hall (早稲田大学大隈記念講堂, Waseda daigaku Ōkuma kinen kōdō), is a Tudor Gothic auditorium of Waseda University in Totsuka, Shinjuku, Tokyo. Designed primarily by Kōichi Satō, construction of the auditorium was planned to begin in 1923 following the death of Waseda founder Ōkuma Shigenobu. Its construction was halted by the 1923 Great Kantō earthquake but eventually began in 1926. It opened in 1927, commemorating the 45th anniversary of the founding of Waseda University. The auditorium includes a large hall with a capacity of over 1,100 seats and a basement hall of about 300 seats. The university's activities, lectures and concerts are held in the auditorium. The clock tower chimes six times a day.

It was classified as a historic building by the Tokyo Metropolitan Government in 1999 and officially designated as an Important Cultural Property in 2007.

== History ==
On January 10, 1922, Ōkuma Shigenobu, former Prime Minister of Japan and founder of Waseda University, died. That same year, the university decided to construct memorials in honor of him on their campus. The first decision was to build a large auditorium. Prior to the auditorium's construction, university ceremonies were held in tents in Waseda's courtyard. In April 1923, the University invited design proposals from the public and began raising money, aiming for ¥2,000,000. Despite a design proposal having been chosen, the project was soon halted on the heels of the Great Kantō earthquake. The costs incurred from the earthquake and the costs of construction of the Waseda University Library resulted in a lack of predicted funds. The project was suspended until 1925, when Waseda began planning again. Kōichi Satō, Takeo Satō, and Tachū Naitō of Waseda's Department of Architecture were requested by the President of Waseda University, Sanae Takada, to create a Gothic architecture design for the auditorium. Construction started on February 11, 1926 by the TODA Corporation, and completed on October 20, 1927.

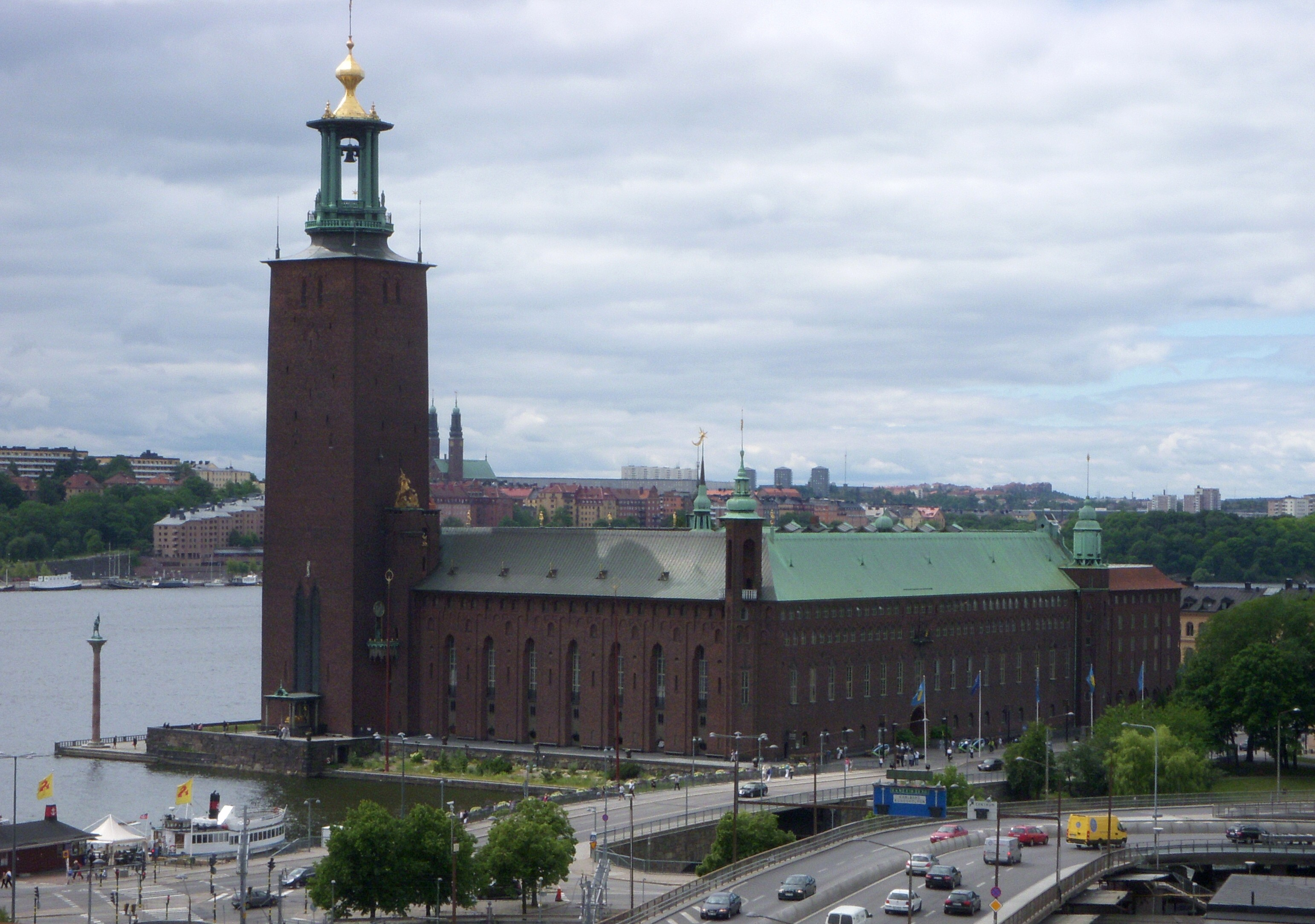
Stockholm City Hall (built between 1909 and 1923), which was thought to have had a major influence on the design of Okuma Auditorium

In April 1999, the Auditorium was designated as the first of the Tokyo Metropolitan Historic Buildings, under the Tokyo Metropolitan Landscape Regulations, which serve to preserve buildings significant to Tokyo's history and culture.

The auditorium was fully renovated between 2006–2007 to commemorate the 125th anniversary of the founding of Waseda University, with work ending on October 2, 2007. The same year, the auditorium was designated as an Important Cultural Property of the Shōwa period by the Japanese Agency for Cultural Affairs on December 4, 2007.

== Overview ==
The auditorium has a capacity of 1,123 on 3 floors and also has a small auditorium with 301 seats on the basement floor. A seven-story high clock tower stands to the left of the auditorium. The height of the tower, at 125 shaku, or about 38 m, represents the theory of "life of 125 years" advocated by Ōkuma.

Ragnar Östberg's design for the Stockholm City Hall (completed in 1923) is thought to be an influence on the auditorium's design. It is also said to resemble Kronborg Castle in Denmark, Carfax Tower in the center of Oxford, and Magdalen Tower at Magdalen College, Oxford.

The bells at the top of the tower were shipped across the Panama Canal from the MacLean Company in Baltimore, United States. It was the first time that four bells had been used in Japan. The bells still produce the same harmony as that of the Palace of Westminster. The clock tower chimes six times a day at 8:00, 9:00, 12:00, 16:00, 20:00 and 21:00.

Oval-shaped transom windows on the roof represent the Sun, Moon, and nine (traditional) planets of the Solar System, and symbolize the "harmony of the universe" both inside and outside the auditorium.

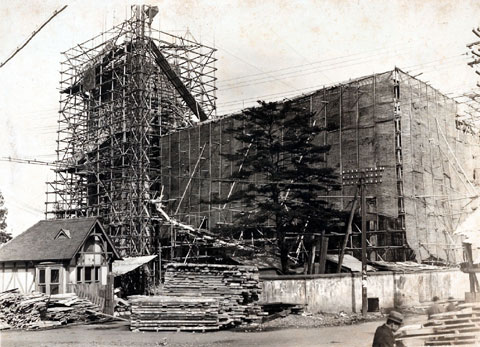
Construction of the auditorium

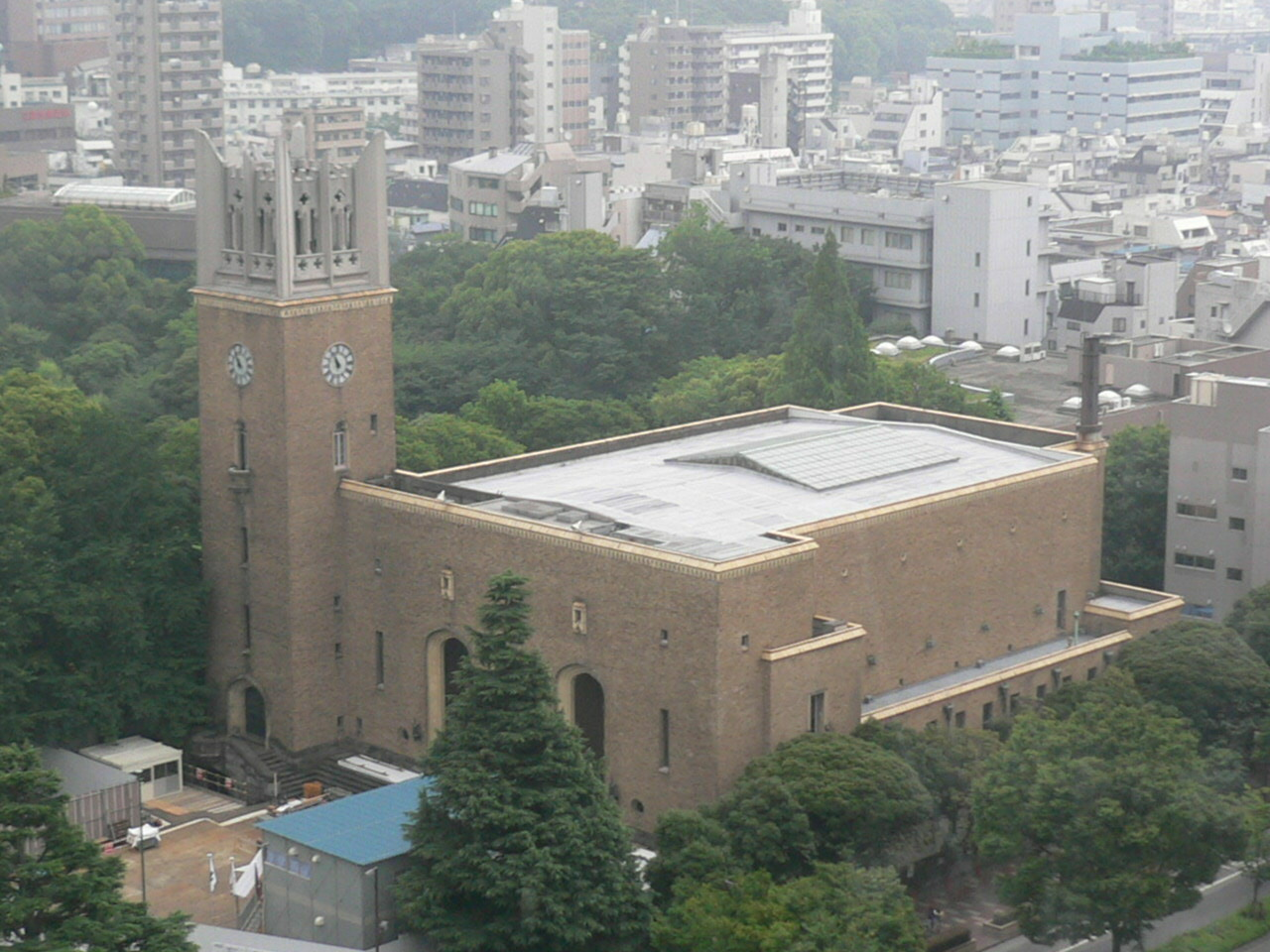
Pre-renovation

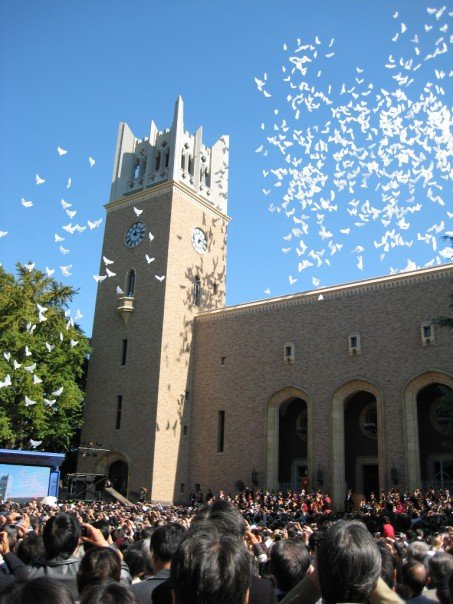
125th anniversary celebration

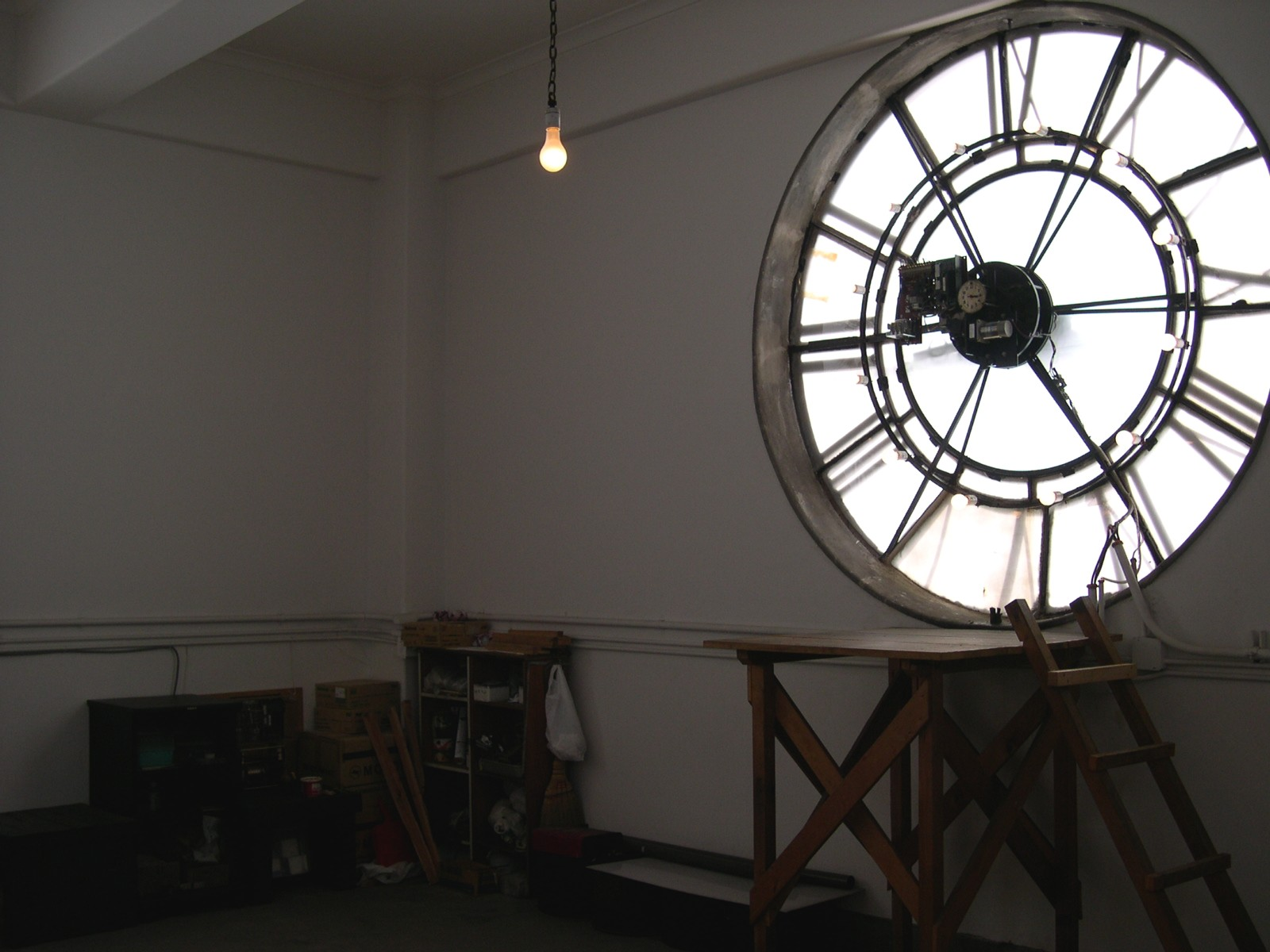
Inside the clock tower

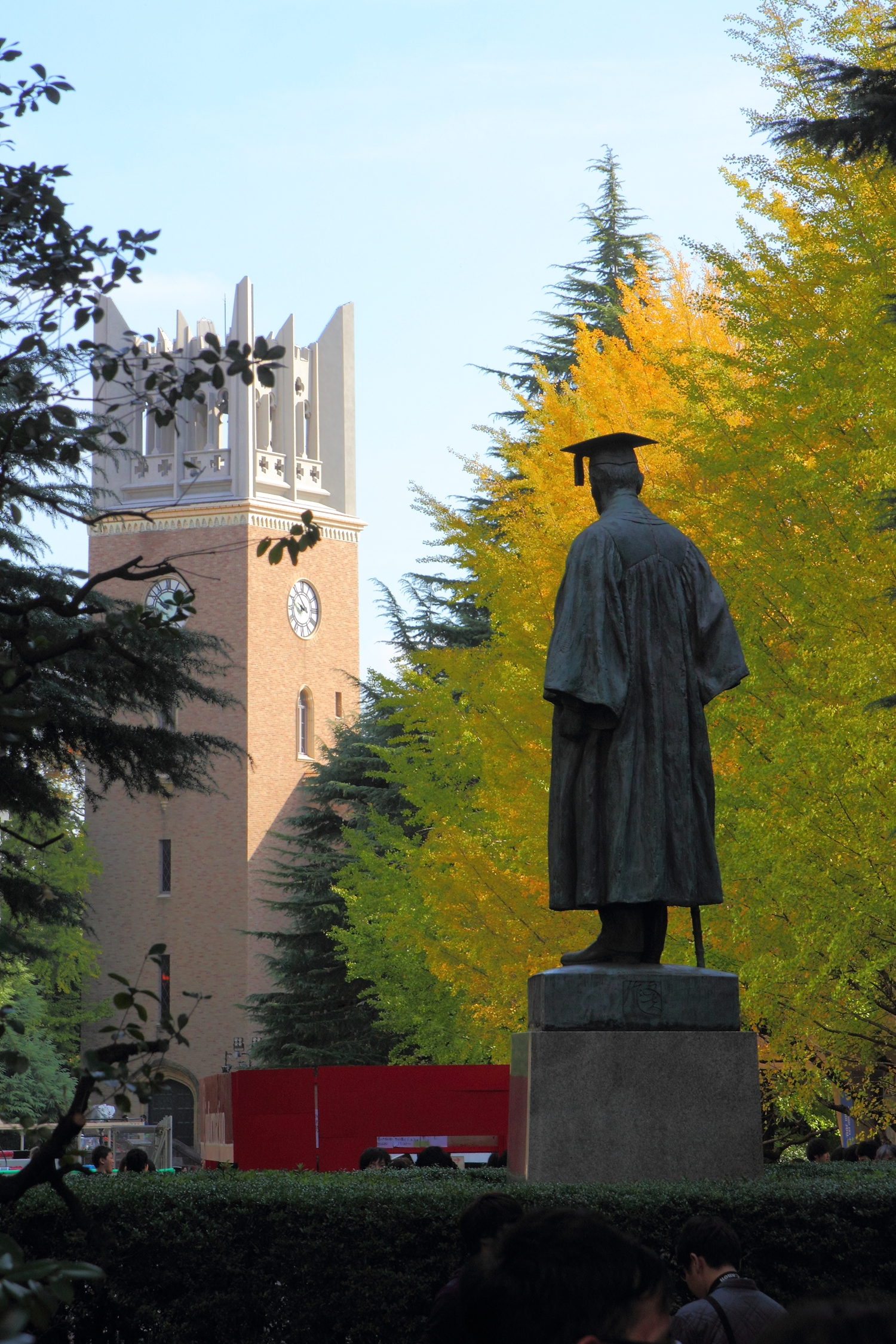
Statue of Ōkuma Shigenobu overlooking the auditorium
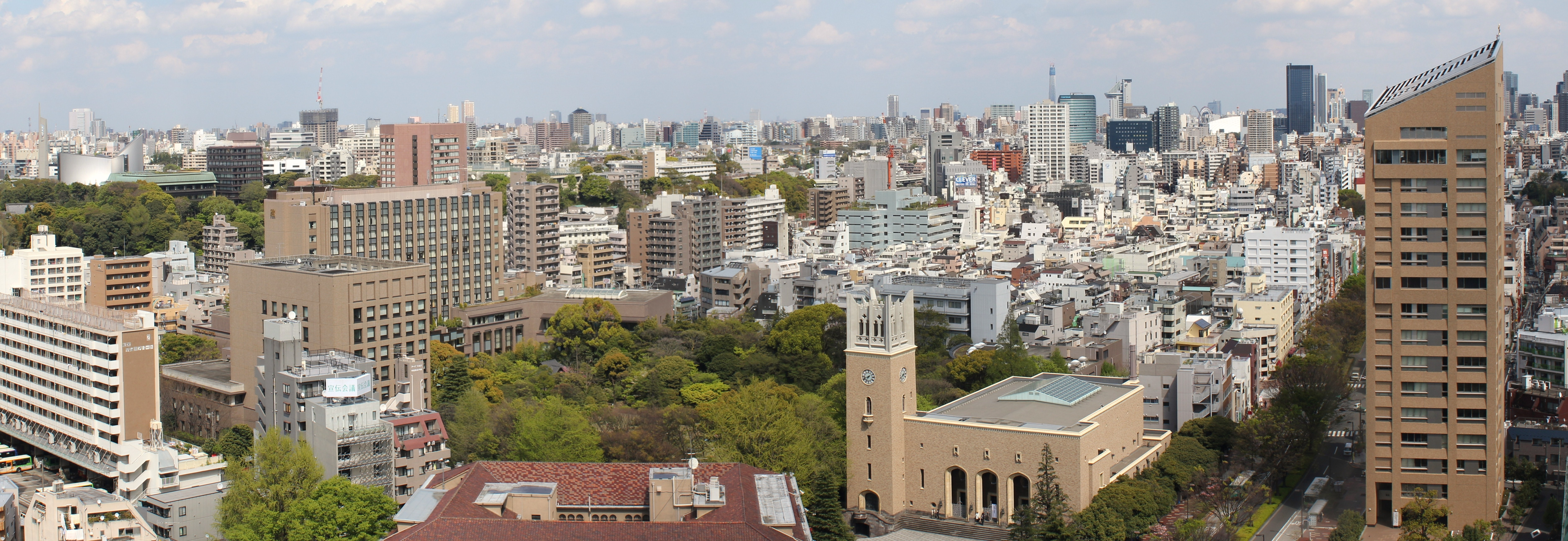
Panoramic view of Waseda's campus with Ōkuma Auditorium in the foreground

== Usage ==
Important events and lectures hosted by Waseda University are often held in the Ōkuma Auditorium. Club-sponsored plays, lectures and events are held in the auditorium on days when it is not in use by the university. Many of Waseda University's undergraduate and graduate schools hold their entrance and graduation ceremonies at the Okuma Auditorium.

In 1946, a retirement ceremony for sekiwake sumo wrestler Katsuichi Kasagiyama, a graduate of Waseda University, was held in the auditorium.

=== Lectures by national leaders ===
- July 7, 1993 – United States President Bill Clinton
- November 28, 1998 – Chinese General Secretary Jiang Zemin
- April 15, 2002 – Japanese Prime Minister Junichiro Koizumi
- May 8, 2008 – Chinese General Secretary Hu Jintao
- July 22, 2012 – Japanese Prime Minister Yoshihiko Noda

== See also ==
- List of Important Cultural Properties of Japan (Shōwa period: structures)
- Media related to Okuma Auditorium at Wikimedia Commons
- Geographic data related to Okuma Auditorium at OpenStreetMap
