= Waseda University =

Private university in Shinjuku, Tokyo, Japan

Coordinates: 35°42′33″N 139°43′10″E

- 早稲田大学
- Latin: Universitas Waseda
- Motto: 学問の独立、学問の活用、模範国民の造就
- Motto in English: Independence of Scholarship, Practical Application of Scholarship, Fostering of Good Citizens
- Type: Private research university
- Established: 21 October 1882; 144 years ago
- Founder: Ōkuma Shigenobu
- Affiliations: AACSB; AALAU; APRU; GUSI; U21; URA
- President: Aiji Tanaka
- Faculty: 2,218 full-time 3,243 part-time
- Administrative staff: 1,257 full-time 119 part-time
- Students: 47,486 (2024)
- Undergraduates: 38,987 (2024)
- Postgraduates: 8,499 (2024)
- Location: Waseda, Shinjuku, Tokyo, Japan
- Campus: Urban
- Athletics: 43 varsity teams
- Colors: Maroon, white, and gold
- Mascot: Waseda Bear
- Website: www.waseda.jp/top/en/
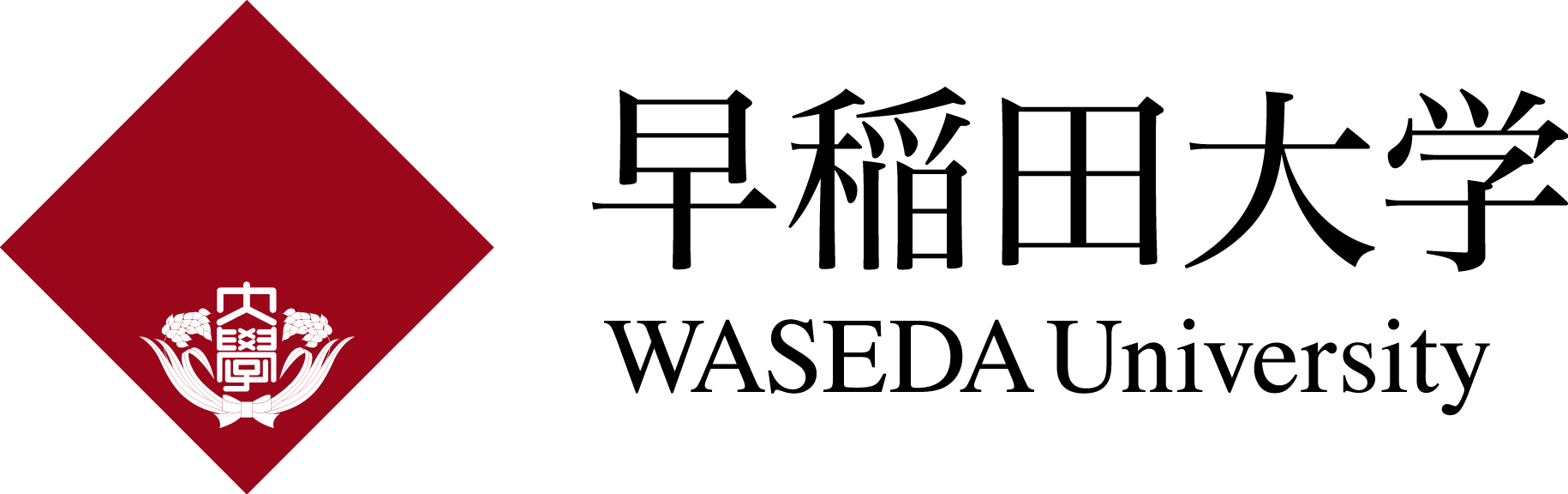

Waseda University (Japanese: 早稲田大学, Hepburn: Wasedadaigaku), abbreviated as Waseda (早稲田) or Sōdai (早大), is a private research university in Shinjuku, Tokyo. Founded in 1882 as the Tōkyō Professional School by Ōkuma Shigenobu, the eighth and eleventh prime minister of Japan, the school was formally renamed Waseda University in 1902.

Waseda is organized into 36 departments: 13 undergraduate schools and 23 graduate schools. As of 2023, there are 38,776 undergraduate students and 8,490 graduate students. In addition to a central campus in Shinjuku (Waseda Campus and Nishiwaseda Campus), the university operates campuses in Chūō, Nishitōkyō, Tokorozawa, Honjō, and Kitakyūshū. Waseda also operates 21 research institutes at its main Shinjuku campus.

The university's faculty and alumni include eight prime ministers of Japan; three prime ministers of Korea; founders of leading Japanese and Korean companies such as Sony, Uniqlo, Samsung, CJ, Lotte, and POSCO; a number of important figures of Japanese literature, including Haruki Murakami, Yoko Ogawa, and Yoko Tawada.

== History ==
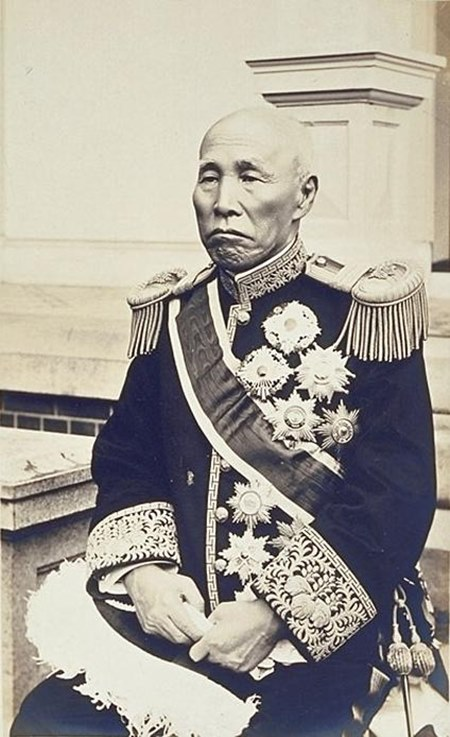
Marquess Okuma Shigenobu (1838–1922), 5th Prime Minister of Japan and founder of the university in 1882

Waseda was founded as Tōkyō Professional School (東京專門學校, Tōkyō Senmon Gakkō) on 21 October 1882 by samurai scholar and Meiji-era politician and former prime minister Ōkuma Shigenobu. Before the name 'Waseda' was selected, it was known variously as Waseda Gakkō (早稲田学校) or Totsuka Gakkō (戸塚学校) after the location of the founder's villa in Waseda village and the school's location in Totsuka village, respectively. It was renamed Waseda University (早稲田大学, Waseda-daigaku) on 2 September 1902, upon acquiring university status. It started as a college with three departments under the old Japanese system of higher education.

In 1882, the university had the department of political science and economics, law, and physical science. Along with these departments, an English language course was established, where the students of all the departments could learn English. Three years later, the department of physical science was closed because it had too few applicants. The department of literature was established in 1890, the department of education in 1903, the department of commerce in 1904, and the department of science and engineering in 1908.

Although Waseda formally adopted the term university in its title in 1902 it was not until 1920 that, along with other private schools and colleges, it received formal government recognition as a university under the terms of the University Establishment Ordinance. Thus Waseda became, with Keio University, the first private university in Japan.

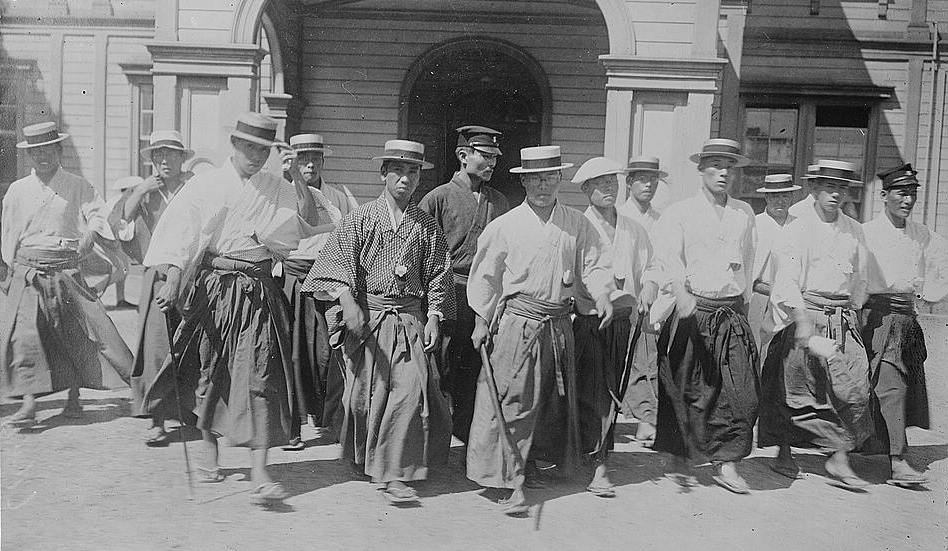
Waseda University students in 1916

Much of the campus was destroyed in the fire bombings of Tokyo during World War II, but the university was rebuilt and reopened by 1949. It has grown to become a comprehensive university with two senior high schools and school of art and architecture.

On 12 June 1950, sixty police raided Waseda University and seized copies of a Communist-inspired open letter to General MacArthur. The open letter to MacArthur was once read at a Communist-sponsored rally a week earlier. The letter demanded a peace treaty for Japan that would include Russia and Communist China, withdrawal of occupation forces, and the release of eight Japanese sent to prison for assaulting five U.S. soldiers at a Communist rally. A police official said most Waseda meetings would be banned in the future because "political elements" might try to utilize them. Yuichi Eshima, Vice-chairman of the Students Autonomy Society, said the police action "stupefied" students and professors, and that "This is worse than the prewar peace preservation measures."

In 1993, President of the United States Bill Clinton visited Waseda University and mentioned that the university is a center of academic excellence and a training ground for Japan's distinguished leaders.

=== Academic cap ===
Ōkuma had long desired to create an academic cap so distinctive that someone wearing the cap would immediately be identified as a Waseda student. The chief tailor of Takashimaya, Yashichiro, was called upon to design a cap in three days. Each square cap was stamped on the inside with the student's name, his department, the school seal and the legend, "This certifies that the owner is a student of Waseda". Thus, the cap served as a form of identification, and effectively a status symbol. The cap, with its gold-braided badge, is registered as a trademark.

=== Anniversary ===
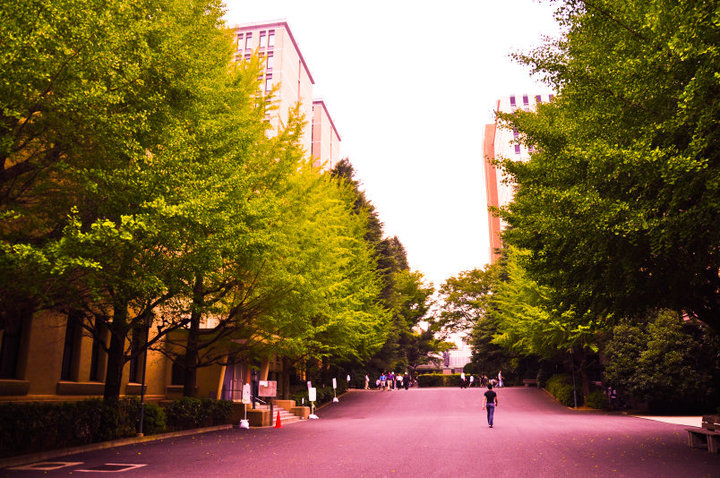
Waseda University

On 21 October 2007, Waseda University celebrated its 125th anniversary. Ōkuma often talked about the "125 years of life" theory: "The lifespan of a human being can be as long as 125 years. He will be able to live out his natural lifespan as long as he takes proper care of his health", because "physiologists say that every animal has the ability to live five times as long as its growth period. Since a man is said to require about 25 years to become fully mature, it follows that he can live up to 125 years of age." This theory propounded by Ōkuma was very popular and often referred to in the media of the time.

In commemorative events relating to Waseda University and Ōkuma, the number 125 is accorded special significance, as it marks an important epoch. The tower of Ōkuma Auditorium, completed on the university's 45th anniversary, is 125 shaku, or about 38 m high. In 1963, there were also events to mark the 125th anniversary of Ōkuma Shigenobu's birth.

Ōkuma, who twice served as prime minister of Japan, organized his second cabinet when he was 77 and died when he was 83. He said, "I wish I had understood this '125 years of life' theory 30 years earlier". He did, however, lead a regular life, and lived fairly long compared to other Japanese at the time.

== Campus ==
Waseda University's main campus is located in the Nishi-Waseda district of Shinjuku. The nearest station is Waseda, Nishi-waseda and Takadanobaba on the Yamanote Line.

Apart from the main campus in Shinjuku, there are other campuses around the country:

- Waseda (Overall Main) Campus: Shinjuku, Tokyo (formerly known as the Nishi-Waseda Campus)
- Nishi-Waseda (Science & Tech Main) Campus: Shinjuku, Tokyo
- Toyama Campus: Shinjuku, Tokyo (Waseda Arena)
- Nihonbashi Campus: Chūō-ku, Tokyo
- Higashifushimi Campus: Nishitōkyō, Tokyo
- Tokorozawa Campus: Tokorozawa, Saitama
- Honjō Campus: Honjō, Saitama
- Kitakyūshū Campus: Kitakyūshū, Fukuoka

== Organization ==
=== Undergraduate programs ===
- School of Political Science and Economics
- School of Law
- School of Culture, Media and Society
- School of Humanities and Social Sciences
- School of Education
- School of Commerce
- School of Creative Science and Engineering
- School of Fundamental Science and Engineering
- School of Advanced Science and Engineering
- School of Social Sciences
- School of Human Sciences
  - e-School (Internet Degree Program), School of Human Sciences
- School of Sports Sciences
- School of International Liberal Studies

=== Graduate programs ===
- Graduate School of Political Science
- Graduate School of Economics
- Graduate School of Law
- Graduate School of Letters, Arts and Sciences
- Graduate School of Commerce
- Graduate School of Creative Science and Engineering
- Graduate School of Fundamental Science and Engineering
- Graduate School of Advanced Science and Engineering
- Graduate School of Education
- Graduate School of Human Sciences
- Graduate School of Social Sciences
- Graduate School of Asia-Pacific Studies
- Graduate School of International Culture and Communication
- Graduate School of Global Information and Telecommunication Studies
- Graduate School of Japanese Applied Linguistics
- Graduate School of Information, Production and Systems
- Graduate School of Sports Sciences
- Business School
- The Okuma School of Public Management
- Law School
- Graduate School of Finance, Accounting and Law
- Graduate School of Accountancy
- Graduate School of Environment and Energy Engineering
- Graduate School of Journalism

=== Research institutes ===
- Kagami Memorial Laboratory for Materials Science and Technology
- Institute for Comparative Law
- The Institute for Research in Business Administration
- Institute for Research in Contemporary Political and Economic Affairs
- Advanced Research Center for Human Sciences
- Advanced Research Institute for Science and Engineering
- Institute of Asia-Pacific Studies
- Global Information and Telecommunication Institute
- Institute for Advanced Studies in Education
- Center for Japanese Language
- Media Network Center
- Environmental Research Institute
- Environmental Safety Center
- Center for Finance Research
- Human Service Center
- Comprehensive Research Organization (Project Research Institute)
- Institute for Nanoscience & Nanotechnology
- Consolidated Research Institute for Advanced Science and Medical Care
- Information Technology Research Organization
- Organization for Asian Studies
- Waseda Institute for Advanced Study (WIAS)

== Facilities ==
=== Ōkuma Auditorium ===
Ōkuma Auditorium, a contemporary building by architect Satō Kōichi

The Ōkuma Auditorium is three-story main auditorium that seats 1,435, while the secondary auditorium, located underground, can accommodate 382 people. A seven-story high clock tower stands to the left of the auditorium. Important events and lectures hosted by Waseda University are often held in the Ōkuma Auditorium. Club-sponsored plays, lectures and events are held in the auditorium on days when it is not in use by the university. Many of Waseda University's undergraduate and graduate schools hold their entrance and graduation ceremonies at the Okuma Auditorium.

The auditorium opened on 20 October 1927, about five years behind schedule, after the 1923 Great Kantō earthquake. A Memorial Hall, constructed in 1957, was used as the fencing venue for the 1964 Summer Olympics.

In April 1999, the auditorium along with the old library building were officially designated the first and second historical buildings under the newly passed Tokyo Metropolitan Landscape Regulations, which aim to preserve buildings representative of Tokyo's history and culture. The auditorium was designated as one of the Important Cultural Properties of Japan by the Agency for Cultural Affairs in 2007.

=== Ōkuma Garden ===
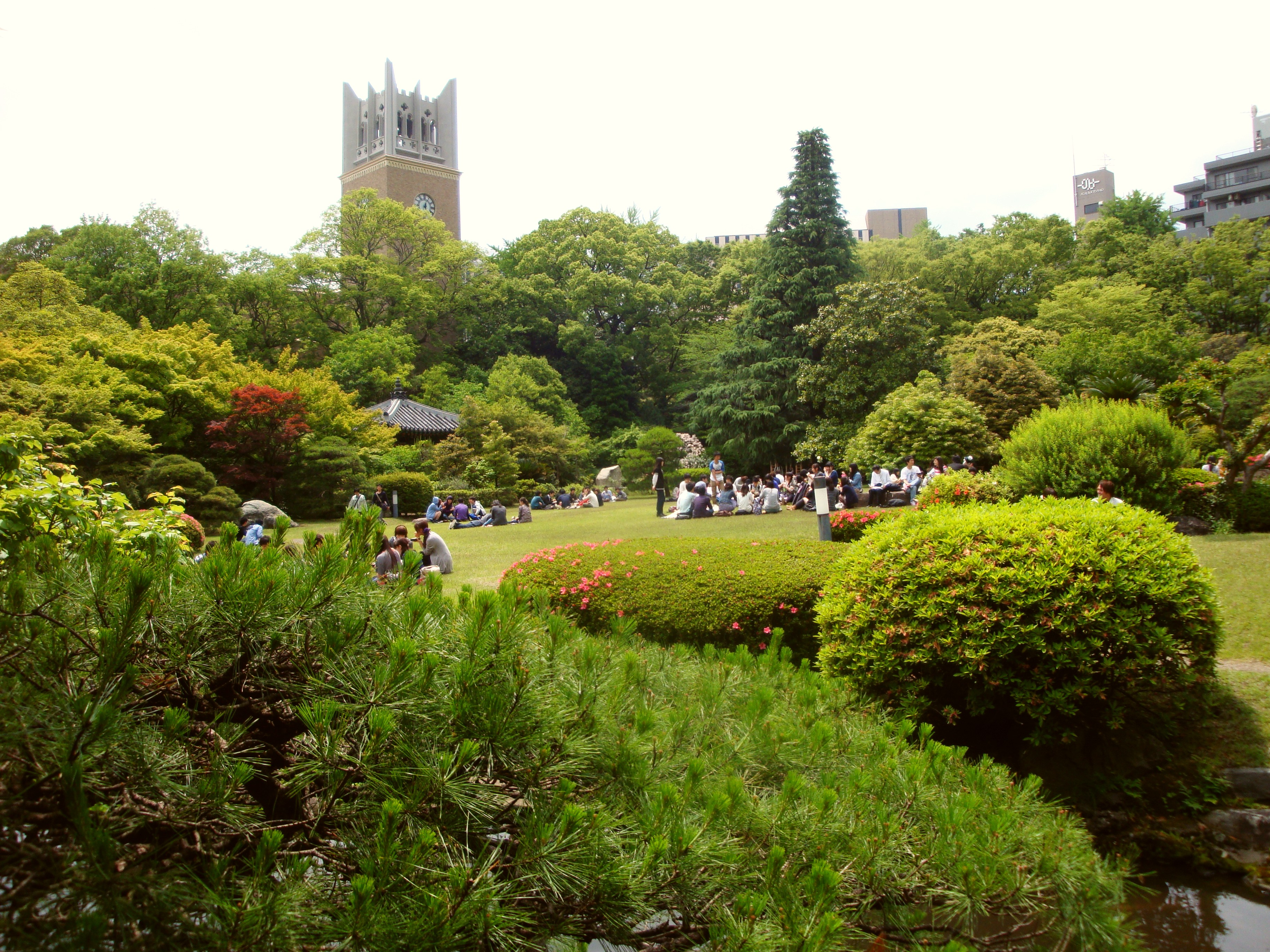
Ōkuma Garden

Ōkuma Garden is located near Ōkuma Auditorium. It is a half-Japanese, half-Western garden of Edo period feudal lord Matsudaira Sanuki's former mansion, redesigned by Shigenobu Ōkuma. After his death, the garden was donated to Waseda University. Now it is a recreation place for students. A Korean temple bell stands in Ōkuma Garden, near the entrance and slightly to the right of the main path, where it is housed in a traditional belfry. The bell is a replica of the Bell of King Seongdeok, associated with the 36th ruler of Silla, a kingdom that existed on the Korean Peninsula from 57 BCE to 935 CE, and one of the best-known surviving bells from the Silla period. The original bell has been described as a cultural treasure of Korea. The replica was produced and donated by members of Waseda University’s Korean alumni community in 1982 to commemorate the university’s centenary, and Waseda University received the bell in 1983 as a gift from its Korean Alumni Association. The donors included Chairman Cho, Lee Kun-hee, the second chairman of Samsung Group, and Shin Kyuk-ho, founder and chairman of Lotte Group. Following its donation, the bell was displayed inside the Ōkuma Auditorium for many years. In 2004, the Korean Alumni Association donated a belfry for the bell, after which the university relocated the bell to Ōkuma Garden. The bell and belfry subsequently became part of the garden’s collection of monuments reflecting Waseda University’s historical ties with Korea. Several Korean stone statues, including dojiseki and dol hareubang, are located near the entrance of the Ōkuma Garden House. Dol hareubang are traditional stone statues originating from Jeju Island, Korea. The statues developed as a distinctive element of Jeju culture and have historically served protective and symbolic functions. Dojiseki are another form of Korean stone figure, originating in the early 19th century and similarly associated with protective functions. In 2007, as part of events commemorating the 125th anniversary of Waseda University, Chun Shin-il, then president of the university’s Korean Alumni Association, donated four pairs of Korean stone statues to Waseda, including examples of dojiseki and dol hareubang. The statues were subsequently installed in Ōkuma Garden as symbols of the longstanding relationship between Waseda University and its Korean alumni community.

=== Libraries and museums ===
The Waseda University Library is collectively one of Japan's largest libraries and currently hold some 4.5 million volumes and 46,000 serials. The Waseda University Library, designed by Tachu Naitō, Kenji Imai and Kin'ichi Kiriyama, was completed in 1925. This five-story building, with a total area of 1,195-tsubo (3,950 m^{2}) (坪), was used initially as the University Library. The reading room was housed in a separate two-story building, with a seating capacity of 500. One of the prominent libraries established at the end of the Taishō period, it has been a symbol of Waseda University to this day, along with the Okuma Auditorium and the Theatre Museum. The Old Library and the administration building were expanded in 1934 and 1955, respectively. After the New Central Library, the Old Library stopped serving as a main library, located where the Abe Stadium used to be, was completed in 1990. It now houses Takata Sanae Memorial Research Library, the University Archives, and Aizu Yaichi Museum. Takata Sanae Memorial Research Library opened in 1994. It is named after former university president Takata Sanae. Historical and cultural materials on Waseda University are exhibited in the University Archives, and the materials related with Ōkuma Shigenobu are exhibited in the Ōkuma Memorial Room at the Archives. Aizu Yaichi Memorial Museum opened in 1998.

In the front hall, visitors are greeted by the masterpiece "Meian", which dates back to 1927. It is painted on the world's largest hand-made washi (Japanese paper), which is 4.45 meters in diameter and weighs about 12 kilograms. It was manufactured by Iwano Heisaburō, the founder of the Echizen paper works in Imadachi-cho, Fukui prefecture. The masterpiece was painted free of charge by Yokoyama Taikan and Shimomura Kanzan, two artists who represented the modern Japanese style of painting. President Takata Sanae asked them to paint a picture for the Library. The library possesses a unique collection which survived the Bombing of Tokyo in World War II unlike many of its counterparts. The collection is an important resource for the study of pre-war Japanese history and literature.

Other museums and libraries on Waseda campuses include:

- Waseda University Tsubouchi Memorial Theatre Museum
- Waseda International House of Literature
- Aizu Museum

== Athletics ==
=== Cheerleading ===
The Waseda University Cheerleading Club is the cheerleading club of Waseda University.

=== Baseball ===
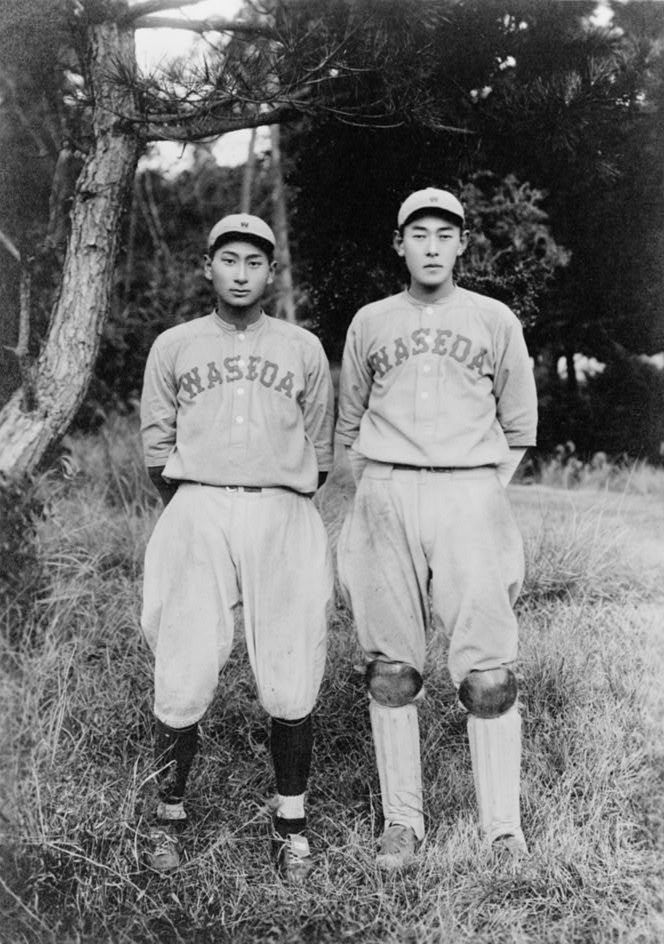
Two Waseda University Baseball Club players from 1921

Waseda's baseball team is known for their long history of success in Tokyo Big6 Baseball League. As of the end of the 2012 season, Waseda had won 43 championships along with the highest winning percentage.They are also known for their rivalry with Keiō University, highlighted by the Sōkeisen series. The series is held twice a year in the spring and autumn at Meiji-Jingu Stadium, considered one of the most important matches of the year for students from both schools.

=== Football ===
Waseda University football team won the Emperor's Cup, in 1964 and 1967.

=== Rugby union ===
Waseda University Rugby Football Club has reached the final of the All-Japan University Rugby Championship 31 times, and winning fifteen times, most recently in 2008. Its two traditional rivals are Keio University and Meiji University.

=== Karate ===
The Waseda University karate club is one of the oldest in Japan, formed in 1931 under the direction of Gichin Funakoshi. Graduates of the karate club include Shigeru Egami, leader of the Shotokai school, Kazumi Tabata, founder of the North American Karate-do Federation and Tsutomu Ohshima, founder of Shotokan Karate of America, and Sadaharu Honda, founder fo Mumon Karate.

=== Fencing ===
Waseda's fencing club was established in 1946. In recent years it has achieved impressive intercollegiate and national results. In 2021, Waseda won the men's Épée team division. In 2022, Waseda further strengthened their achievements, claiming victory in all weapon types (Foil, Sabre, Épée) for both men and women's division.

=== Bending ===
In 2016, the first university bandy team in Japan was founded. With no field of regular size, they play rink bandy.

Other notable figures associated with Waseda’s athletic activities include Mimi Huh, a Korean judoka and Waseda graduate who won an Olympic medal, and former basketball player Mamiko Tanaka, the wife of Shohei Ohtani. The university’s Coffee Research Society, founded in the 1960s, is also well known and operates a café inside the Waseda University History Museum.

== Rankings ==
University rankings
Global
THE	General	801–1000
QS	General	196
ARWU	Research	701–800

Regional
THE Asia (Asia version)	General	201–250
QS Asia (Asia version)	General	51

National
Truly Strong Universities	General	2

=== General ===
The university ranked 2nd in 2015–2016 in Toyo Keizai's Truly Strong Universities (本当に強い大学) ranking. In 2023, Waseda University ranked 199th overall, 118th in academic reputation, and 24th in employer reputation in the QS World University Rankings.

By subject, Waseda University ranked 25th in Classics and Ancient History, 42nd in Modern Languages, 70th in Law and Legal Studies, 54th in Arts and Humanities, 50th in Politics, 77th in Social Science and Management, 40th in Sports Sciences, 51–100th in Business and Management, 128th in Economics and Econometrics, 101–150th in Engineering, 101–150th in Computer Science, and 115th in Mathematics in the QS World University Rankings by Subject.

=== Research performance ===
Generally speaking, national universities in Japan have better research standards; however, as one of the RU11, Waseda is one of the few private universities which compete with top national universities.

=== Detailed ===
According to the Asia Top MBA Business Schools Ranking by Asiaweek, Waseda Business School is ranked 2nd in Japan. Eduniversal also ranked Japanese business schools and Waseda is 2nd in Japan (93rd in the world). In this ranking, Waseda is one of only 3 Japanese business schools categorized in "Universal Business schools with major international influence". Waseda University is one of the few universities in Japan to receive accreditation from the Association to Advance Collegiate Schools of Business (AACSB) of the United States of America.Waseda Law School is considered one of the top Japanese law schools, as Waseda's successful candidates for bar examination was 5th in 2009 and 2010 in Japan.

=== Alumni ===
Mines ParisTech: Professional Ranking World Universities ranked Waseda University as 4th in the world in 2010 (8th in 2011) in terms of the number of alumni listed among CEOs in the 500 largest worldwide companies. The university is also ranked 2nd in Japan for the number of alumni holding the position of executive in the listed companies of Japan. The number of lawyers who graduated Waseda has been ranked 3rd in Japan since 1949. Furthermore, Waseda alumni have been the 2nd largest group in the Japanese Parliament.

=== Selectivity ===
Waseda is one of the most selective and sought after universities in Japan. The number of applicants per place was 20.5 (115515/5630) in the 2011 undergraduate admissions. This number of applicants was 2nd largest in Japan. its entrance difficulty is usually considered top with Keio among 730 private universities.Nikkei BP has been publishing a ranking system called the "Brand rankings of Japanese universities" every year, composed of various indicators relating to the power of brand, with Waseda achieving top place in 2010 and 3rd place in 2009 in the Greater Tokyo Area. As of 2020, Waseda University is securely ranked in 2nd place, directly behind the University of Tokyo.

=== Business ===
According to 2020 Nikkei Survey to all listed (3,714) and leading unlisted (1,100), totally 4,814 companies, Waseda is ranked 2nd out of 810 Japanese universities as of 2026.

== International relations ==
Albert Einstein visited Waseda University in November 1922 during his historic six-week tour of Japan.

Its alumni include influential Chinese government figures such as Zhou Enlai and Li Dazhao. Kim Seong-su, former vice president of South Korea, established Korea University, one of the Korean peninsula's leading institutions. This connection led to a professional academic collaboration between Waseda and Korea University starting in 1973, culminating in a dual degree program at the bachelor's and master's levels. In 1982, Waseda University initiated an academic exchange agreement with Peking University. Since 2005, this partnership has offered double degree programs at the bachelor's, master's, and doctoral (Ph.D.) levels, illustrating the university's dedication to international academic collaboration.

Several foreign heads of state have delivered major addresses at Waseda University. First, on July 7, 1993, U.S. President Bill Clinton delivered a historic speech at Waseda University in Tokyo, becoming the first sitting President of the United States to visit a Japanese university. On November 28, 1998, Jiang Zemin, then President of the People’s Republic of China, delivered a speech at the Ōkuma Auditorium during the first official visit to Japan by a Chinese head of state. On May 8, 2008, his successor Hu Jintao also delivered an address at Waseda University during his state visit to Japan, emphasizing the development of Sino-Japanese relations, mutual understanding, and exchanges between young people of the two countries.

Kim Young-sam, President of South Korea, delivered a speech at Waseda University on March 25, 1994, where he was awarded an honorary Doctor of Laws degree. He later served as a specially appointed professor at Waseda University from 2002 to 2007.

== People ==
=== Alumni ===
There are currently more than 600,000 alumni members. According to Japanese media, there are over 3,100 famous individuals known nationwide in Japan who are alumni of Waseda University. Among the notable alumni of Waseda University have become leading politicians, businessmen, writers, architects, athletes, actors, musicians, scientists, and those that have gained both national and international fame. To develop alumni connections, the Waseda network consists of over 50 alumni groups, or "Tomonkai", on six continents. Among notable alumni are Masaru Ibuka, co-founder of Sony; Shuntaro Furukawa, president of Nintendo; novelist Haruki Murakami; Prime Ministers of Japan Tanzan Ishibashi, Noboru Takeshita, Toshiki Kaifu, Keizō Obuchi, Yoshirō Mori, Yasuo Fukuda, Yoshihiko Noda and Fumio Kishida; pioneering video artist and experimental filmmaker Kohei Ando; As mentioned above, notable global alumni of Waseda University include Lee Byung-chul and Lee Kun-hee, Chairmen of Samsung; Kim Seong-su, former vice president of South Korea and founder of Korea University; Shin Kyuk-ho, founder of Lotte Group and builder of one of the world's top five skyscrapers, Lotte World Tower. Kim Young-sam, former President of South Korea who also served as an honorary doctorate and professor; and Park Tae-joon, former chairman of POSCO and Prime Minister of South Korea. Waseda University has also produced two Speakers of the National Assembly of South Korea, Shin Ik-hee, one of the political forebears of the Democratic Party of Korea, currently South Korea's largest political party and ruling party, and Hwang Nak-ju.

Li Dazhao, Chen Duxiu, Zhou Enlai co-founder of the Chinese Communist Party; Palme d'Or winning director Shohei Imamura; Tadashi Yanai, founder and CEO of Fast Retailing and the richest man in Japan; Chiune Sugihara, Japanese diplomat who rescued 5,558 Jews during the Holocaust; Shizuka Arakawa, 2006 Olympic Champion figure skater; famed tanka poet Hakushū Kitahara; Doppo Kunikida, Meiji-era novelist and poet noted as one of the inventors of Japanese naturalism; former mayor of Osaka city Tōru Hashimoto; accomplished Major League Baseball player Nori Aoki; and 2014, 2018 two-time Olympic Champion figure skater Yuzuru Hanyu.

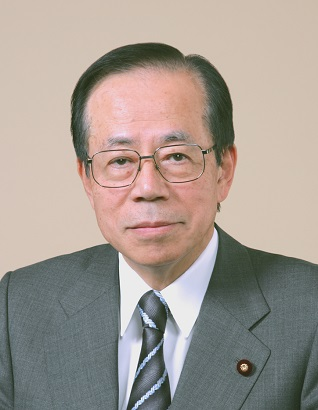
Yasuo Fukuda

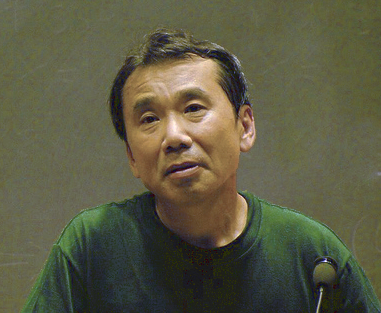
Haruki Murakami

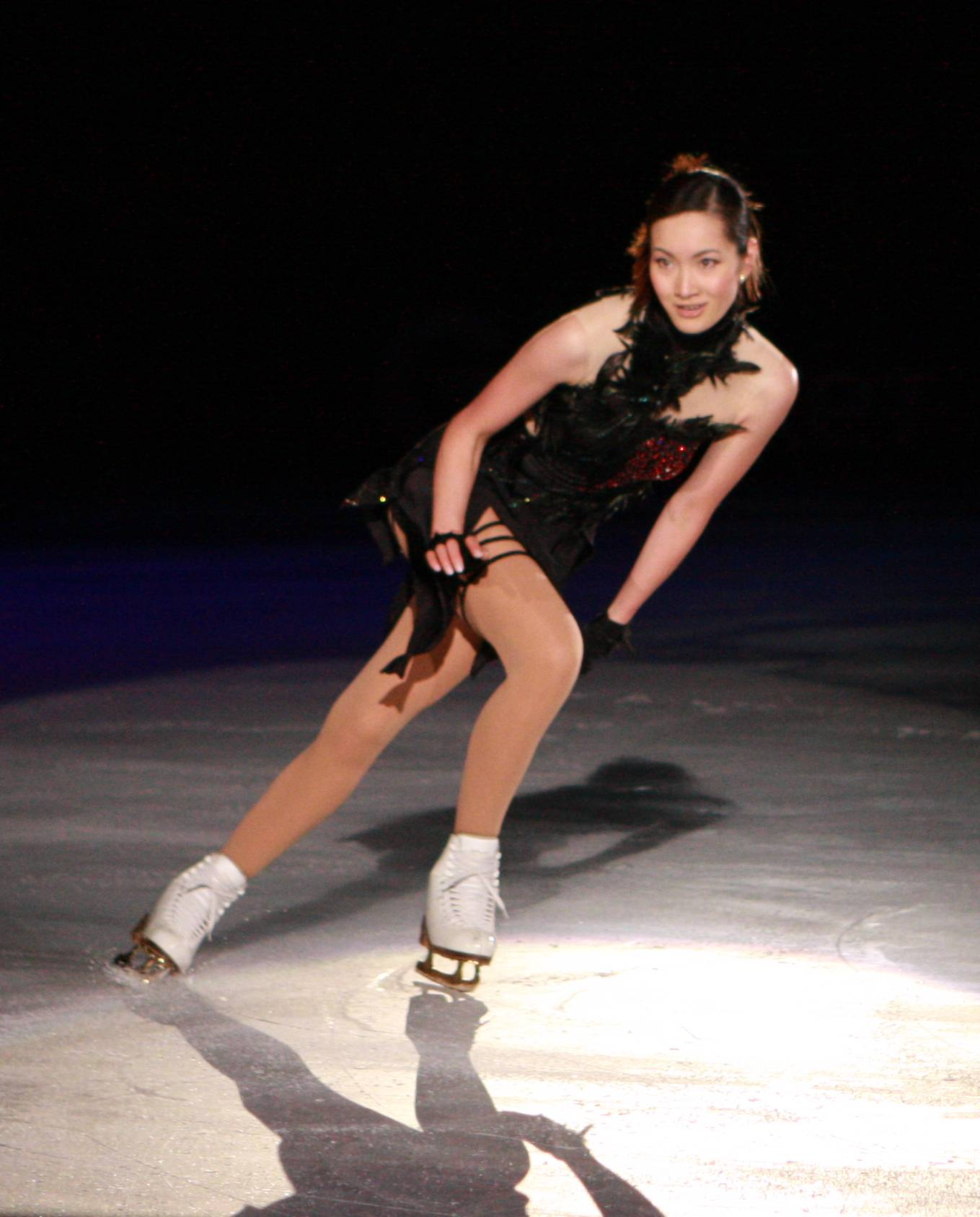
Shizuka Arakawa

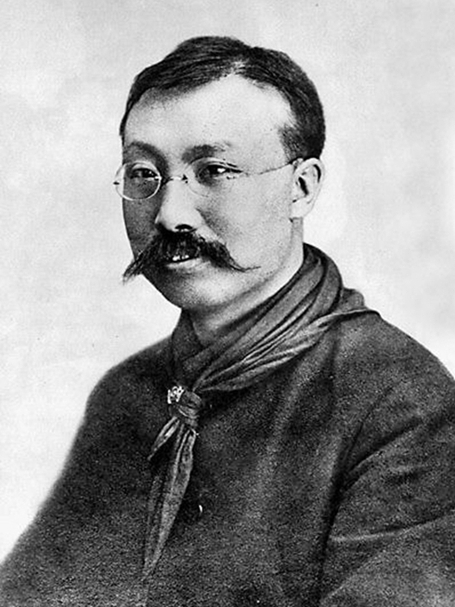
Li Dazhao

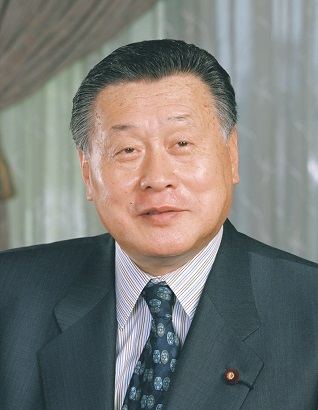
Yoshirō Mori

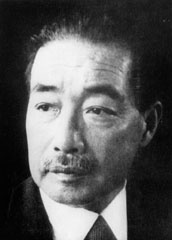
Hakushū Kitahara

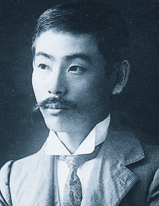
Doppo Kunikida

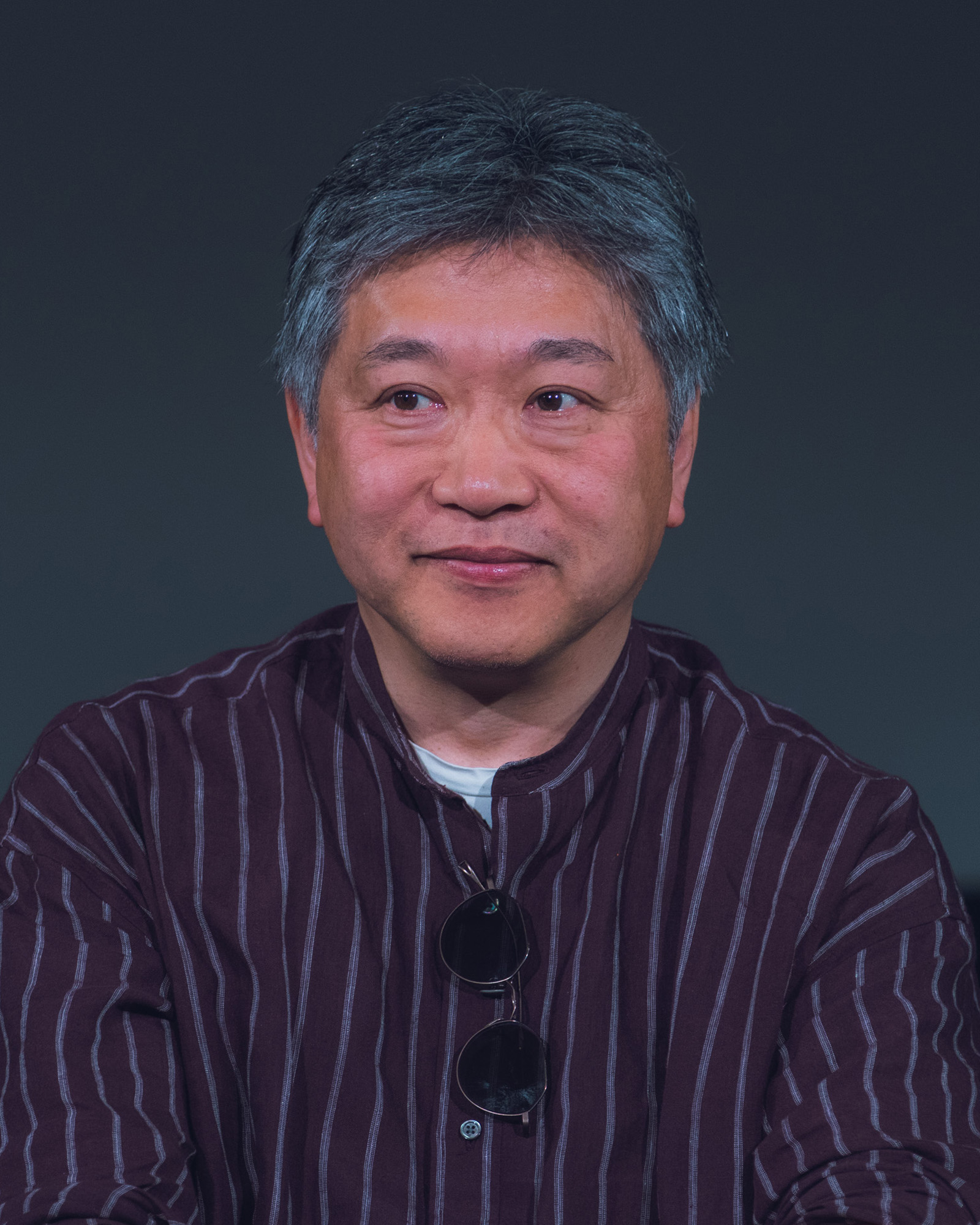
Hirokazu Kore-eda

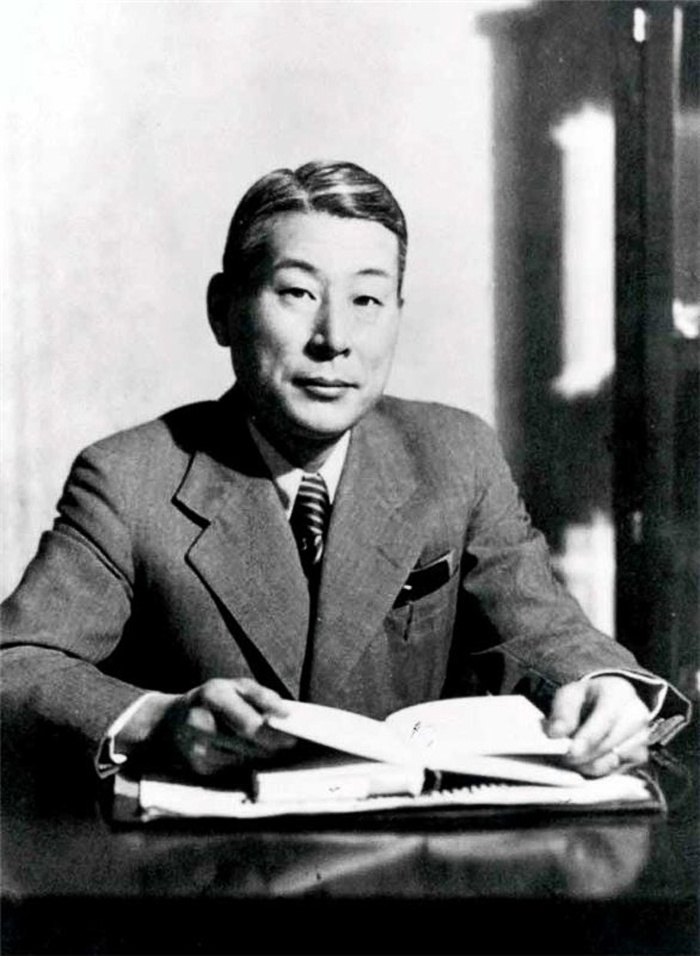
Chiune Sugihara

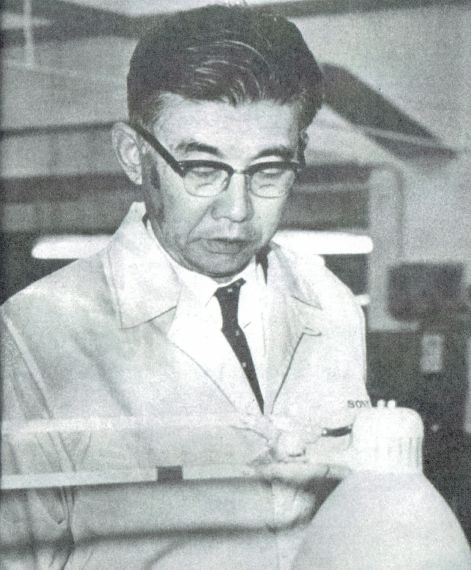
Ibuka Masaru

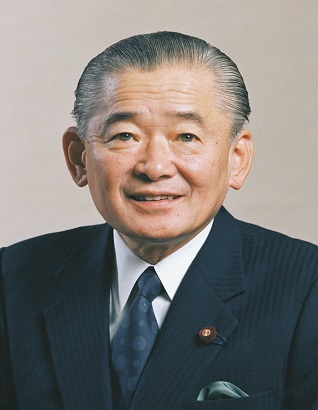
Noboru Takeshita

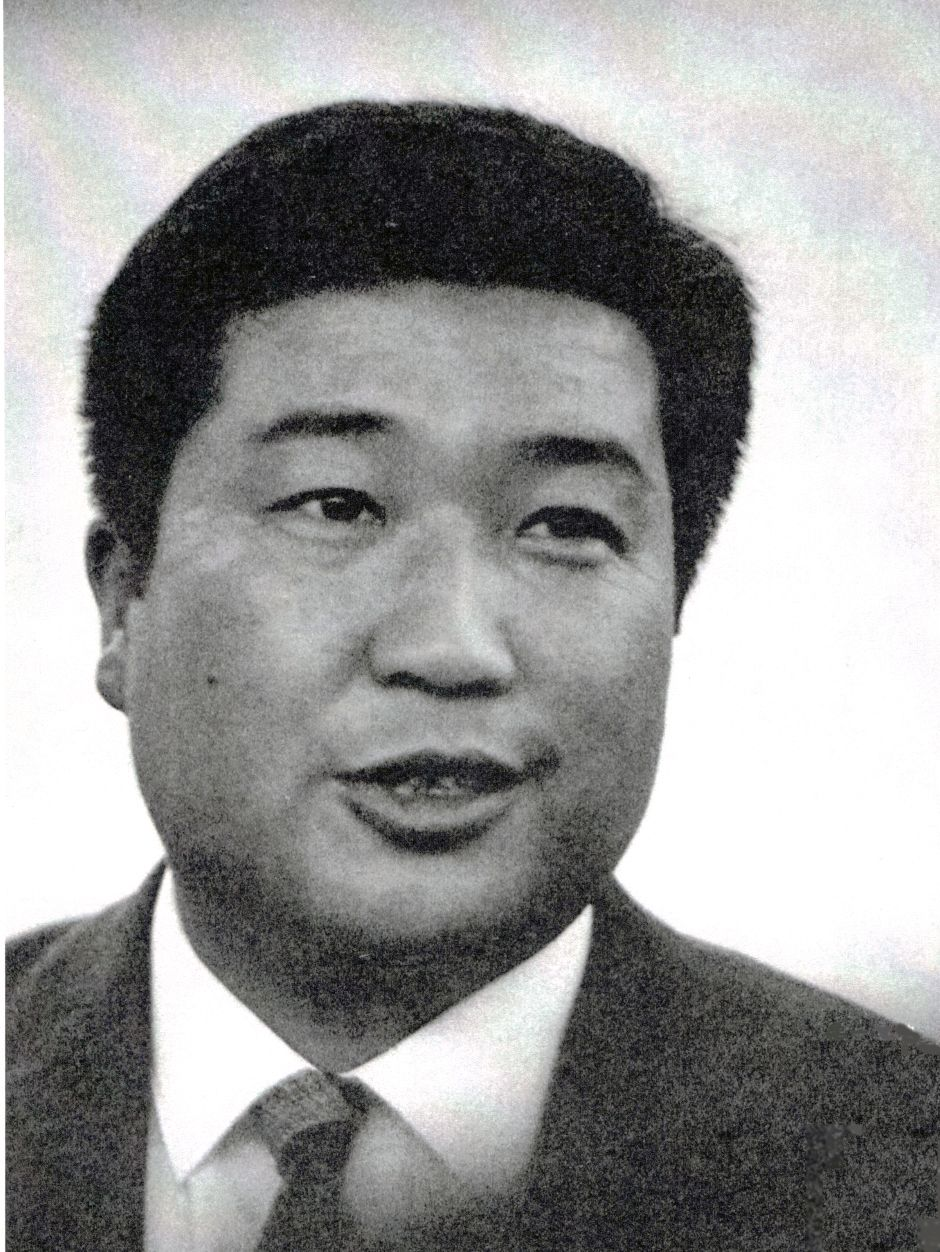
Shohei Imamura

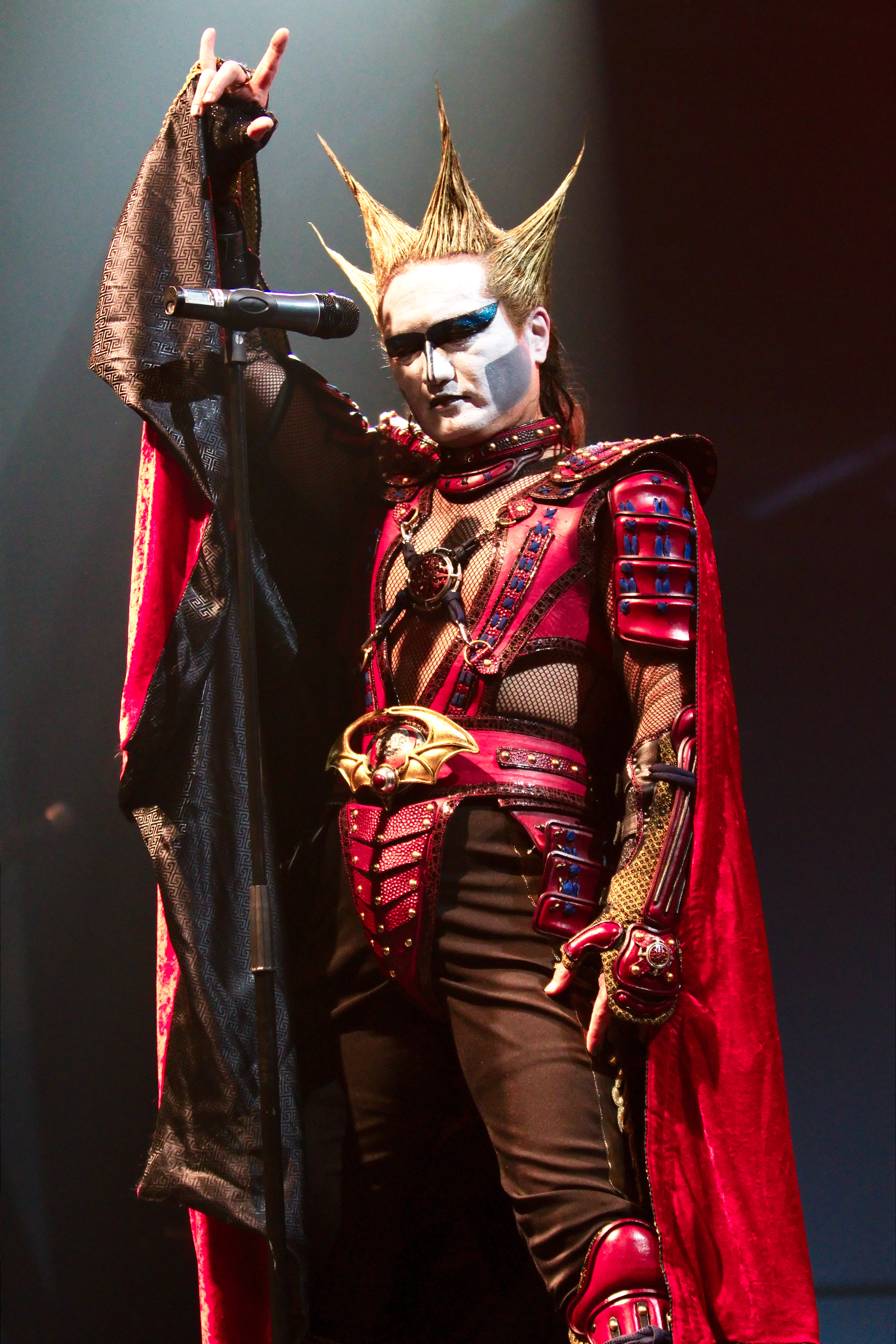
Demon Kakka

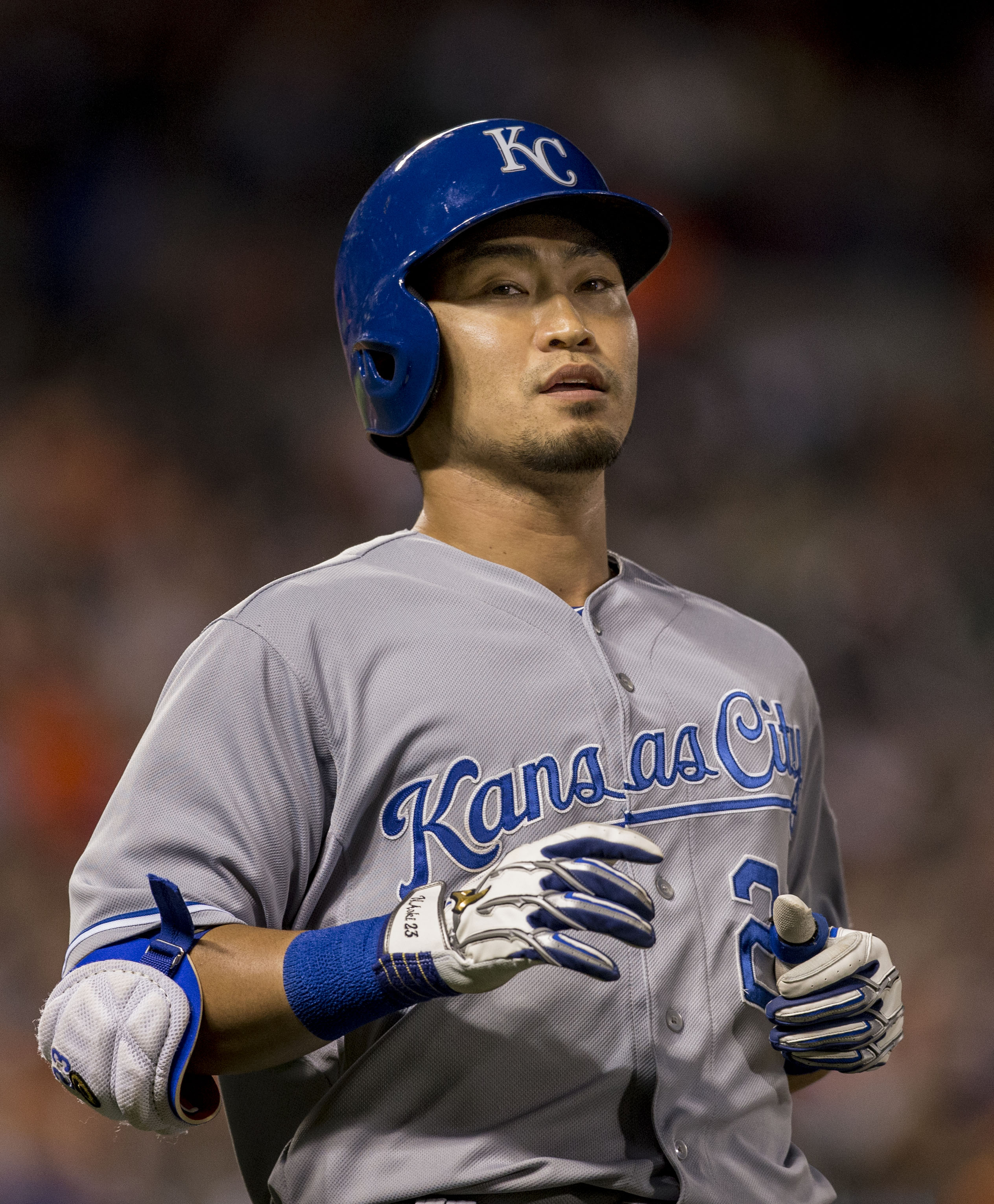
Nori Aoki

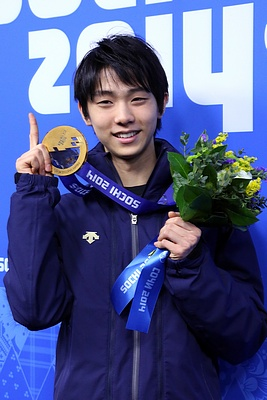
Yuzuru Hanyu

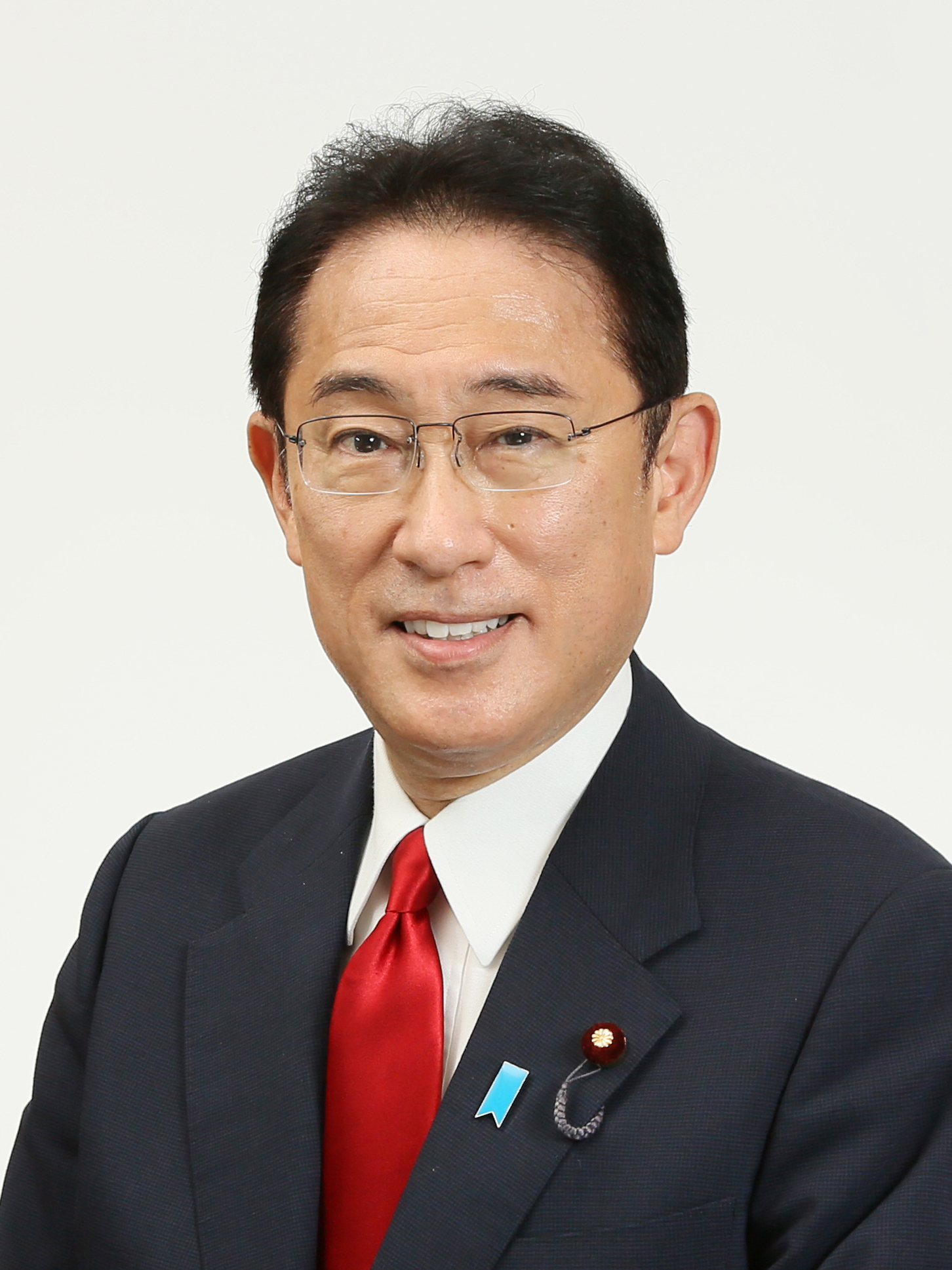
Fumio Kishida
- Fumio Kishida – The 100th and 101st prime minister, Faculty of Law.
- Yasushi Kaneko – Politician, Faculty of Commerce.
- Hiroshi Kawauchi
- Toshiki Kaifu – The 76th and 77th prime minister of Japan, Faculty of Law
- Hirokazu Koreeda – Graduated from the Faculty of Literature, a film director, and has been a professor at Waseda University since 2014.
- Yuji Kuroiwa – Politician.
- Hiroyuki Nagahama – Politician.
- Himeka Nakamoto – Faculty of Human Sciences. Former member of Nogizaka46.
- Shogo Nakamura – Baseball player, Chiba Lotte Marines.
- Kichiemon Nakamura – Kabuki actor. His elder brother, Hakuo Matsumoto, graduated from the Faculty of Drama.
- Reiko Matsushita - Politician.
- Fukushiro Nukaga – Politician.
- Akira Nishino – Former soccer player, led the Japanese team in the Russian World Cup, and currently coaches the Thailand national team.
- Miki Nonaka – Member of Morning Musume.
- Yoshihiko Noda – The 95th prime minister, Faculty of Political Science and Economics.
- Makiko Tanaka – Politician.
- Shuichi Takatori – Politician.
- Ryota Takeda – Politician.
- Noboru Takeshita – The 74th prime minister, Faculty of Commerce
- Noriko Tsuiki – Textile artist, weaver, author, and printmaker
- Demon Kakka – Vocalist of Seikima-II, which originated from a Waseda University folk song club
- Jin Matsubara – Politician.
- Yoshiro Mori – The 85th prime minister, Faculty of Commerce.
- Takeshi Mori – Animation director.
- Tomomi Mochizuki – Animation director.
- Jun Murakami – Professional lyricist, affiliated with the highest level of the Japan Professional Mahjong League.
- Haruki Murakami – Graduated from the Faculty of Literature, a novelist
- Shingo Miyake – Graduated from the Faculty of Political Science and Economics
- Marino Miyata – Winner of the 2009 Miss Japan contest. Gained attention as a high school student when she won Miss Japan. Later active in broadcasting, movies, magazines, and more. Entered Waseda University's Faculty of Political Science and Economics in April 2010, graduated in 2014, and joined the Bank of Japan.
- Satoshi Mitazono – Graduated from the Faculty of Education
- Ayu Hazaki – Gravure idol. Graduated from Faculty of Human Sciences in March 2023 with a certification in child-care
- Yosuke Nagai – Founder and executive director of Accept International

=== Faculty ===
Professors who are also Waseda alumni are listed in italics.

- Yaichi Aizu, poet, scholar of ancient Chinese and Japanese art, and namesake of Aizu Museum
- Tameyuki Amano, economics scholar and educator
- Kohei Ando, professor emeritus of Cinema
- Yasunobu Fujiwara, scholar of political science
- Lafcadio Hearn, novelist, literary scholar, professor of English literature
- Smimasa Idditti (Sumimasa Idichi ), professor of English
- Kenji Imai, architect
- Tokio Kimura, historian
- Kunitake Kume, historian
- Tachu Naito, architect
- Naoyoshi Nakamura, historian
- Haruo Nishihara, law professor, former president
- Takayasu Okushima, law professor, former president
- Hajime Ōnishi, philosopher
- Ikuo Ōyama, scholar of political science
- Yaso Saijo, poet
- Masasada Shiozawa, scholar of economics, former president
- Sanae Takata, scholar of political science, former president
- Ōdō Tanaka, philosopher
- Shoyo Tsubouchi, playwright, critic, translator, educator, professor of English literature, and namesake of Tsubouchi Memorial Theater Museum
- Sokichi Tsuda, historian, recipient of the Order of Culture
- Kazutami Ukita, scholar of political science
- Shujiro Urata, economist
- Yoshio Yamanouchi, translator, scholar of French literature
- Akira Yonekura, law professor
- Takamasa Yoshizaka, architect
- Shigeaki Sugeta, linguist

=== Presidents ===
==== Principals, de facto presidents (1882–1907) ====
- Hidemaro Ōkuma, 1882–1886
- Hisoka Maejima, 1886–1890
- Kazuo Hatoyama, 1890–1907

==== De facto presidents (1907–1923) ====
- Sanae Takata, 1907–1915
- Tameyuki Amano, 1915–1917
- Yoshiro Hiranuma, 1918–1921
- Masasada Shiozawa, 1921–1923

==== Presidents ====
- Shigenobu Ōkuma, 1907–1922
- Masasada Shiozawa, 1923
- Sanae Takata, 1923–1931
- Hozumi Tanaka (public finance scholar, Doctor of Laws, 1876–1944), 1931–1944
- Tomio Nakano, 1944–1946
- Koichi Shimada, 1946–1954
- Nobumoto Ōhama, 1954–1966
- Kenichi Abe, 1966–1968
- Tsunesaburo Tokikoyama, 1968–1970
- Sukenaga Murai, 1970–1978
- Tsukasa Shimizu, 1978–1982
- Haruo Nishihara, 1982–1990
- Chūmaru Koyama, 1990–1994
- Takayasu Okushima, 1994–2002
- Katsuhiko Shirai, 2002–2010
- Kaoru Kamata, 2010–2018
- Aiji Tanaka, 2018–present

=== Trustees ===
- Ryuhoku Narushima, poet, journalist, and one of the first trustees of Waseda
- Azusa Ono (1852–1886), law scholar and one of the first trustees of Waseda

=== Benefactors ===
Waseda University has had numerous benefactors, including:

- Eiichi Shibusawa, businessman and philanthropist
- Ichizaemon Morimura, businessman
- Koichiro Kagami, businessman
- Kenkichi Kodera, presenter of over thirty-six thousand foreign books to the Library
- Kisaku Maekawa, businessman and philanthropist
- Masaru Ibuka, after whom Masaru Ibuka Auditorium (Hall) is named.
- Robert J. Shillman, founder & CEO of Cognex Corporation, the namesake of Robert Shillman Hall

== See also ==
- Keio University
- Korea University
