= Ōkuma Garden =

Garden in Tokyo, Japan

- 大隈庭園
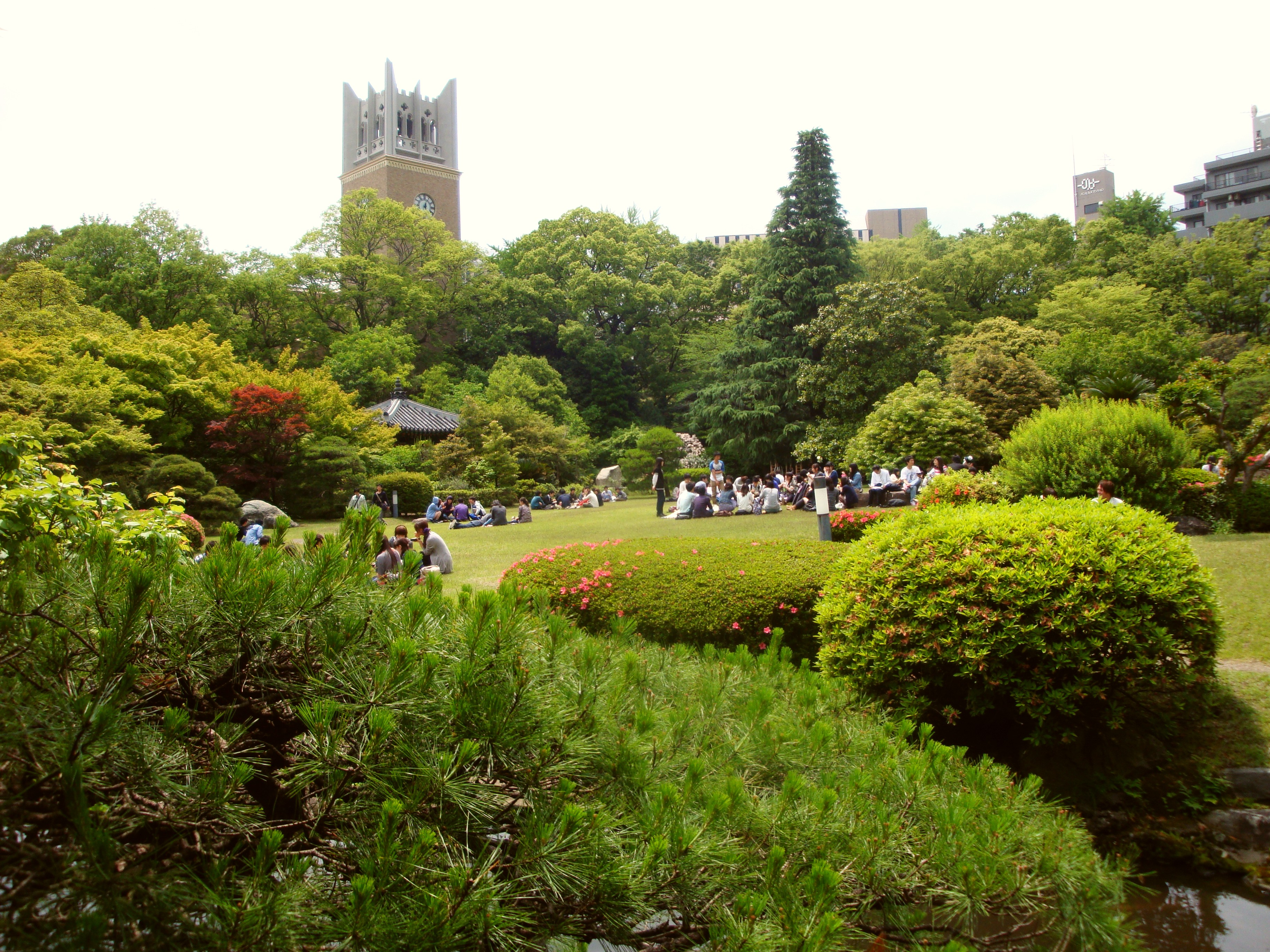
- Interactive map of Ōkuma Garden
- Type: Japanese garden
- Location: Shinjuku, Tokyo, Japan
- Coordinates: 35°42′35″N 139°43′19″E
- Area: 3,000 square metres (0.74 acres)
- Created: 1922

Ōkuma Garden (大隈庭園, Ōkuma teien) is a Japanese garden located in Shinjuku, Tokyo. It belongs to Waseda University. The garden covers an area of about 3,000 square metres.

It was previously the residence of the Ii family and Matsudaira clan. In 1884, Shigenobu Ōkuma, the founder of Waseda University, remodeled the garden into semi-Western style. He placed a vast lawn, artificial hills, and ponds, and grew melons in a hothouse for the first time in Japan. After his death, the garden was donated to Waseda University. Although it suffered serious damage in the air raid of 1945, it was almost restored and now is a recreation place for students. The garden features an extensive lawn, brooks, seasonal plants and walking paths. There are lanterns, small stone pagodas, statues. Reduced-size replica of “Shotoku-Daiou-Shinkyo” which was donated by the Korean graduates’ association in commemoration of the 100th anniversary of the university, now adorns the garden.

Okuma Garden is located approximately 5 minutes' walk from Waseda Station, and it is open from 11:00 until 16:00 on Monday, Tuesday, Thursday, and Friday during the semesters, April to December. It is closed on rainy days.

== Gallery ==
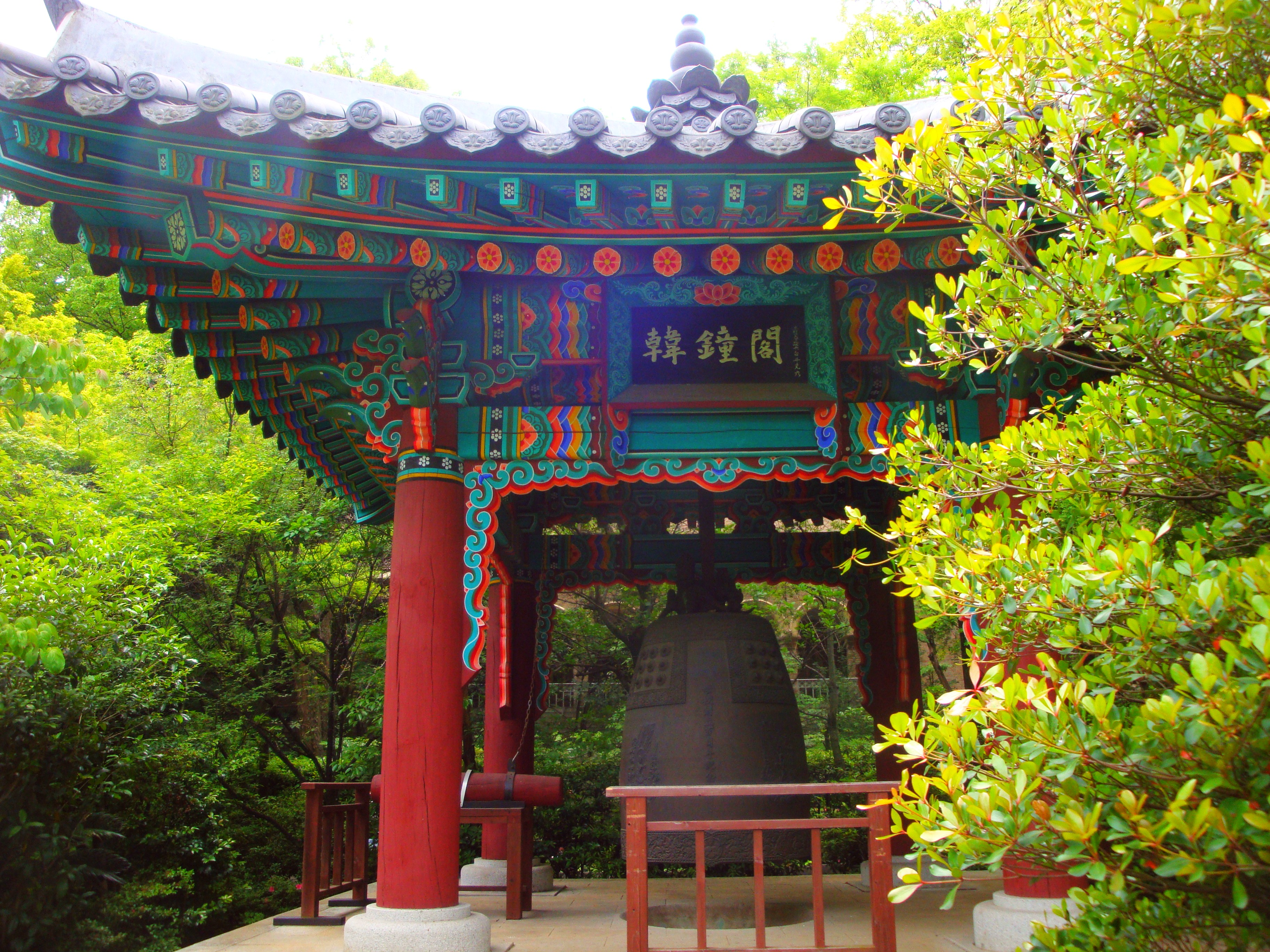
The Korean Bell

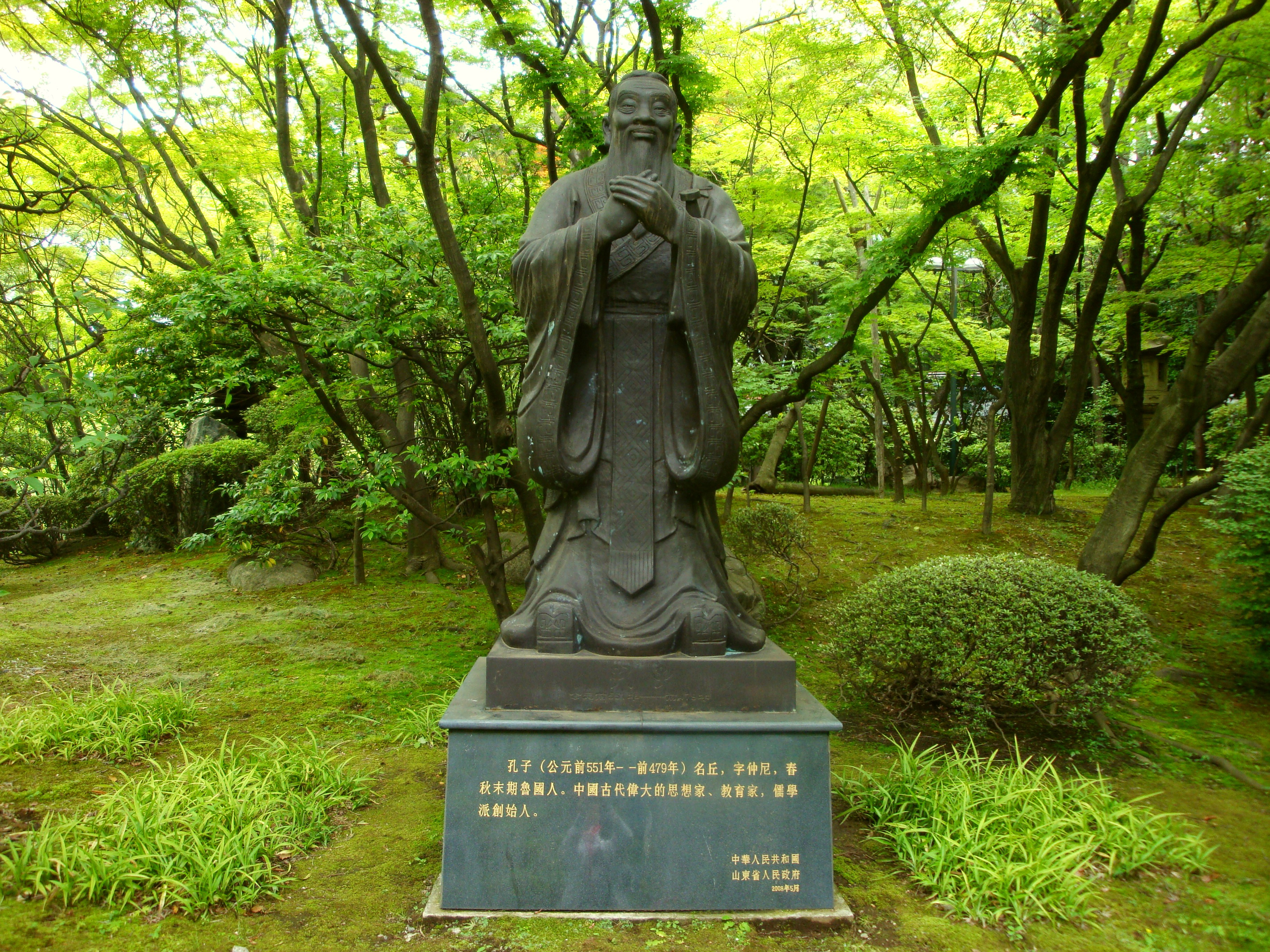
Confucius

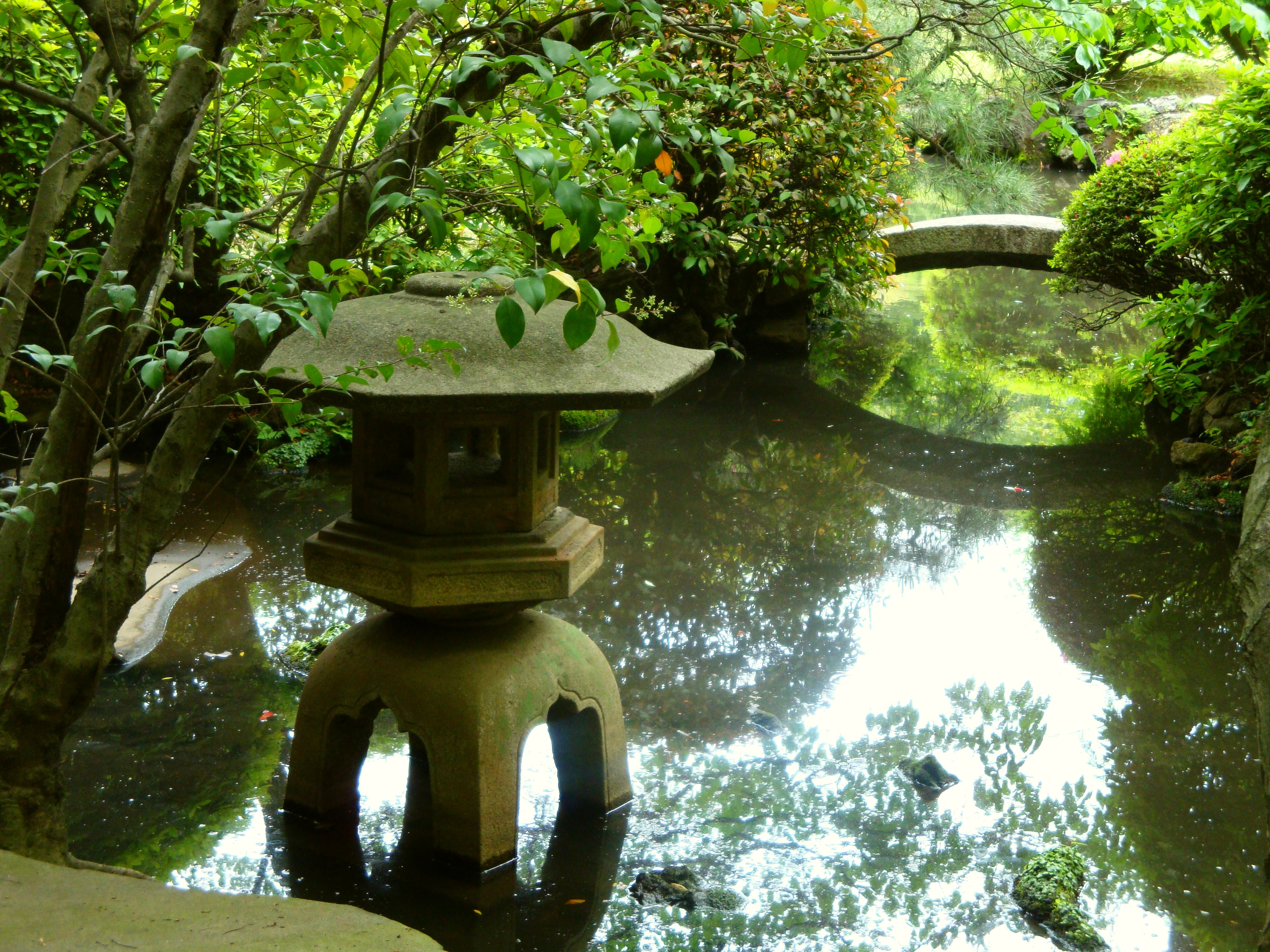
A lantern and a stone bridge

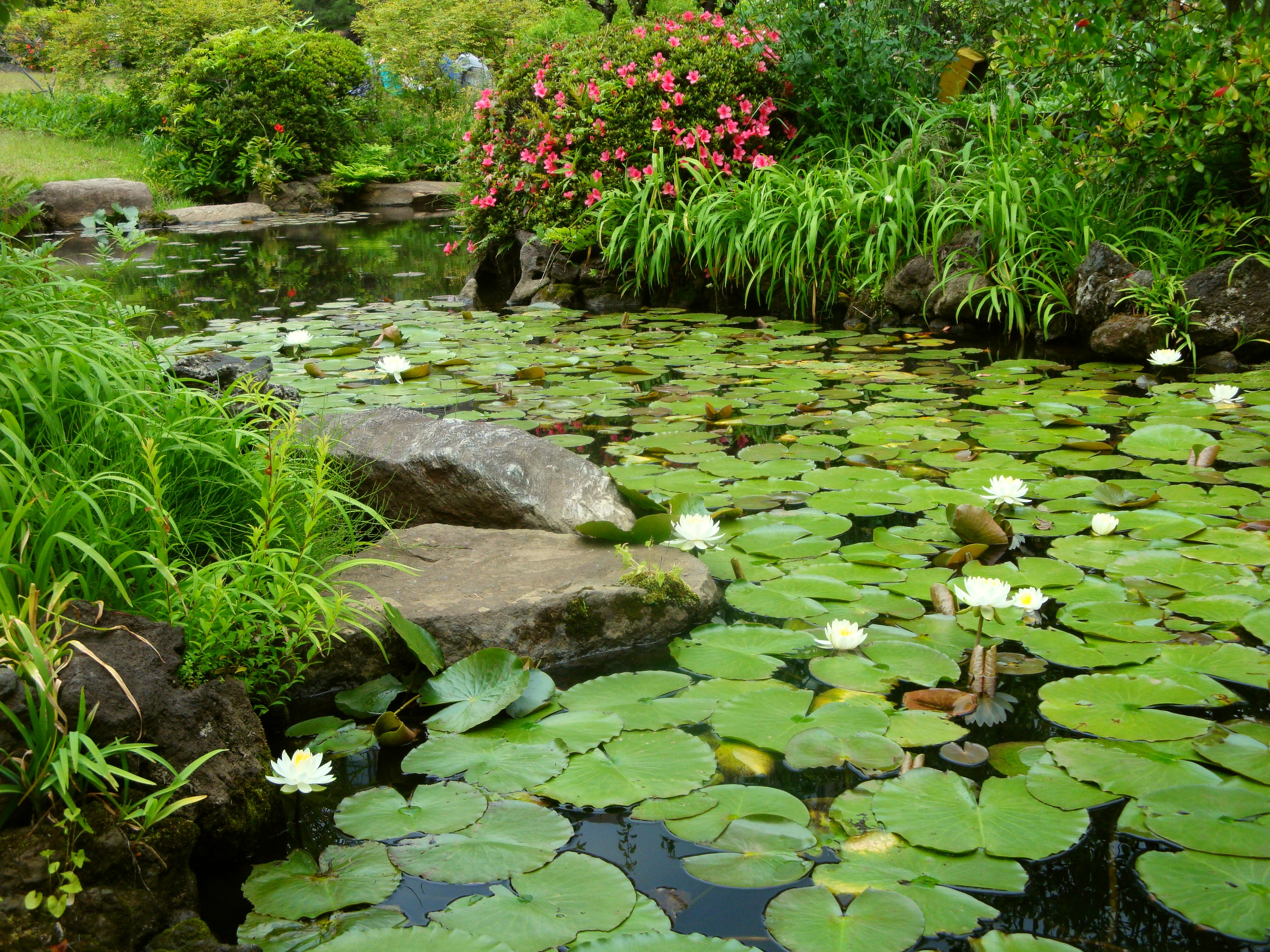
A pond with lotuses
