= Waseda University Library =

University library in Japan

Coordinates: 35°42′32.38″N 139°43′7.88″E

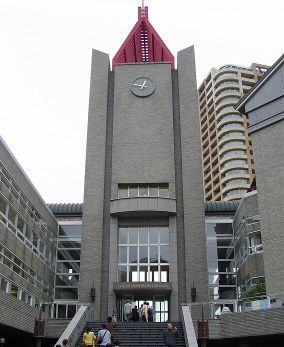
Clock tower

Map

Waseda University Library (Japanese: 早稲田大学図書館, Hepburn: Waseda Daigaku Toshokan) is the academic library of Waseda University. Established in 1882, its collections form one of the largest libraries in Japan, currently holding some 5.6 million volumes and 46,000 serials.

== History ==
The Waseda University Library (早稲田大学図書館; Waseda Daigaku Toshokan) was originally established at the time of the founding of the university in 1882 (at that time called 東京専門学校; Tokyo Senmon Gakkou). Its current Central Library building was opened in 1991, commemorating the university's centennial. All together the university has 29 libraries: the Central Library, four Campus Libraries, and school libraries or reading rooms for students, attached to each school and institute. These libraries are said to hold 5.6 million books.

The Waseda University Library also possesses a unique collection which survived the Bombing of Tokyo in World War II unlike many of its counterparts. It possesses some items which even the National Diet Library does not have. Because of this, its collection is an important resource in the study of pre-war Japanese history and literature.

== Branches ==
The library consists of a central library and four main branch libraries, each located on a different campus. These branches include the S. Takata Memorial Research Library (with limited student access), the Library of Science and Engineering, the Toyama Library, and the Tokorozawa Library. Additionally, there are several departmental and special institute libraries that are integrated into the library system.

== Collections ==
The Waseda University Library owns a large number of materials of eminent cultural value. Alongside the two items designated as National Treasures and five sets (187 items) as Important Cultural Assets, are manuscripts, rare books, calligraphy, handwritten strips of poems, archival materials related to Japanese history, and several special collections named after their donors, among others. Because of their rarity, access to such materials is usually limited, except for special exhibitions.

Among Waseda University Library's many unique collections are the following:

- Literary works from the Qing dynasty of China, collected by a writer of Chinese verse, Noguchi Ichitaro (pen name: Neisai, 1867–1905);
- History of the Ming dynasty, donated in 1910 by Shimomura Masataro (1883–1944), the owner of Daimaru Draper in Kyoto and alumnus of Waseda;
- Statistical literature in early modern Japan;
- Governmental materials and letters related to the university's founder;
- Chinese military books of the Qing and Ming eras;
- Japanese and Chinese classical mathematics, in particular numerous editions of "Jinkoki";
- Japanese books of the late Edo period;
- Original manuscripts of the renga masters (Sōgi, Shinkei etc.); and
- History of the modern Japanese legal system.

Outside of the library system, Waseda University also has museums including the Waseda Theatre Museum, which contains its own collection. Waseda Institute of Asia-Pacific Studies (part of the Graduate School of Asia-Pacific Studies) also houses important special collections of materials like the Masuda Collection on politics and law in Indonesia in the 1950s–1960s and the Nishijima Collection on the Japanese occupation of Indonesia.

== Access ==
The Waseda University Library system generally limits access to students, faculty, research fellows, alumni association members, and Waseda Supporters Club members (with a donation of ¥30,000). However, with a letter of introduction from another university library requesting access to specific materials, entry is possible. Additionally, student/faculty ID holders from Keio University, Doshisha University, Hitotsubashi University, and Kansai University can access the library without a letter of introduction. Students from some foreign universities may be able to apply for privileged access if Waseda University has signed an agreement with that university, but in May 2014 there was no reference to these agreements on the Waseda Library website. For example, on May 30, 2002, Professor Michitaro Urukawa, director of Waseda University Library, and Columbia University librarian James G. Neal signed such a memorandum that outlines an agreement between the two libraries to cooperate in the exchange of materials, information access, Interlibrary loan and staff exchanges. Waseda University has also signed a similar agreement with the University of Maryland, College Park.
