= List of Sciences Po people =

This is a list of alumni, former staff, and those otherwise associated with Sciences Po. For further information, refer to the list of Sciences Po alumni in the French Wikipedia. Neither list is complete.

== Heads of international organisations ==
- Audrey Azoulay (b. 1972), Director general to UNESCO (2017–present)
- Bertrand Badré (b. 1968) Managing Director of World Bank (2013–Present)
- Boutros Boutros-Ghali (1922–2016), United Nations Secretary-General (1992–1996)
- Michel Camdessus (b. 1933), managing director of the International Monetary Fund (1987–2000)
- Jean-Claude Paye (b.1934), secretary general of the OECD
- Francis Blanchard (1916–2009), director-general of the International Labour Organisation (1974–1989)
- Alpha Condé (b. 1938), Chairperson of African Union (2017–present)
- Nicole Fontaine (1942–2018), President of the European Parliament (1999–2001)
- Gilbert Guillaume (b. 1930), ex president of the International Court of Justice (2000–2003)
- Pascal Lamy (b. 1947), Director-General of the World Trade Organization
- Pierre Lellouche, president of the NATO Parliamentary Assembly
- Roger Ockrent (1907–1983), chairman of the Organisation for Economic Co-operation and Development (1957–1974)
- Dominique Strauss-Kahn (b. 1949), ex-Managing Director of the International Monetary Fund
- Marisol Touraine (b. 1959), Chair of Unitaid Executive Board
- Justin Vaïsse (b. 1973), Director General of the Paris Peace Forum
- Simone Veil (1927–2017), president of the European Parliament (1979–1984)
- Wan Waithayakon (1891–1976), president of the United Nations General Assembly (1956–1958)
- Roger Auboin (1891–1974), general manager of the Bank for international settlements (1938–1958)
- Guillaume Guindey (1909–1989), general manager of the Bank for international settlements (1958–1963)
- Elena Zhemkova, co-founder of Memorial Society
- Jean-Paul Costa (1941–2023), president of the European Court of Human Rights (2007–2011)
- Mattias Guyomar (b. 1968), president of the European Court of Human Rights (2025–present)

== Heads of state or government ==
=== World ===
- Pridi Banomyong (1900–1983), Prime Minister of Thailand (1946), Regent of Thailand (1941–45)
- Edvard Beneš (1884–1948), President of Czechoslovakia (1935–1948)
- Paul Biya (b. 1933), President of Cameroon (1982–present)
- Hissène Habré (b. 1942), President of Chad (1982–1990)
- Habib Bourguiba (1903–2000), President of Tunisia (1957–1987)
- Alpha Condé (b. 1938), President of Guinea (2010–present)
- Esko Aho,(b. 1954), former prime minister to Finland (1991–1995)
- Bảo Đại (1913–1997), Emperor of Vietnam (1926–1955), Emperor of Annam (1926–1945)
- Chandrika Kumaratunga (b. 1945), President of Sri Lanka (1994–2005)
- Mohammad Mosaddegh (1882–1967), Prime Minister of Iran (1951–1953), Time magazine Man of the Year (1951)
- Rainier III (1923–2005), Prince of Monaco (1949–2005)
- Enrico Letta, Prime Minister of Italy (2013–2014), Present Dean at Sciences Po
- José Sócrates (b. 1957), Prime Minister of Portugal (2005–2011)
- Pierre Trudeau (1919–2000), Prime Minister of Canada (1968–1979, 1980–1984)
- Pierre Werner (1913–2002), Prime Minister of Luxembourg (1959–1974, 1979–1984), so-called "father of the Euro"
- Hasan Saka (1885–1960), Prime Minister of Turkey (1947–1949)
- Salome Zurabishvili (12–2018), President of Georgia
- Angela Merkel (b. 1954), Chancellor of Germany (2005–2021)
- Václav Havel (1936–2011), President of Czechoslovakia (1989–1992), President of the Czech Republic (1993–2003)
- Jonas Gahr Støre (b. 1960), Prime minister of Norway (2021–)

==== France ====
- René Pleven (1901–1993), Prime Minister of France (1950–1951, 1951–1952)
- Georges Pompidou (1911–1974), President of the French Republic (1969–1974)
- Alain Poher (1909–1996), acting President of France (1969, 1974), President of the Senate (1968–1992)
- Édouard Balladur (b. 1929), Prime Minister of France (1993–1995)
- Raymond Barre (1924–2007), Prime Minister of France (1976–1981)
- Jacques Chaban-Delmas (1915–2000), Prime Minister of France (1969–1972)
- Jacques Chirac (1932–2019), President of the French Republic (1995–2007), Prime Minister of France (1983–1986, 1986–1988)
- Maurice Couve de Murville (1907–1999), Prime Minister of France (1968–1969)
- Michel Debré (1912–1996), Prime Minister of France (1959–1962)
- Laurent Fabius (b. 1946), Prime Minister of France (1983–1986), President of the Constitutional Council (2016–)
- François Hollande (b. 1954), President of the French Republic (2012–2017)
- Lionel Jospin (b. 1937), Prime Minister of France (1997–2002)
- Alain Juppé (b. 1945), Prime Minister of France (1995–1997)
- Nicolas Sarkozy (b. 1955), President of France (2007–2012) (Note: attended)
- Emmanuel Macron (b. 1977), President of the French Republic (2017–)
- Pierre Mauroy (1928–2013) Prime Minister of France (1981–1984)
- François Mitterrand (1916–1996), President of the French Republic (1981–1995)
- Michel Rocard (1930–2016), Prime Minister of France (1988–1991)
- Dominique de Villepin (b. 1953), Prime Minister of France (2005–2007)
- Édouard Philippe (b. 1970), Prime Minister of France (2017–2020)
- Jean Castex (b. 1965), Prime Minister of France (2020–2022)
- Gabriel Attal (b. 1989), Prime Minister of France (2024)
- Michel Barnier (b. 1951), Prime Minister of France (2024)

== Politics and government ==
=== World ===
- Nebahat Albayrak, Turkish–Dutch politician in the Netherlands;
- Jean Pierre Lacroix, Under-Secretary-General for Peace Operations (2017–)
- Alin Mituța, Member of the European Parliament, former Secretary of State in the Romanian Government
- J. Brady Anderson, US ambassador to the United Republic of Tanzania
- François-Albert Angers, Canadian economist
- Jihad Azour, Minister of Finance of Lebanon (2005–present)
- Jeremy Kinsman, former Canadian ambassador to European Union
- Howard Balloch, erstwhile Canadian ambassador to China, director at Zi Corporation
- Rula Ghani, First lady of Afghanistan
- Adrian A. Basora, United States ambassador
- Cina Lawson, Minister in Togo Government
- Íngrid Betancourt, Colombian senator, anti-corruption activist, and candidate for president of Colombia
- Sir John Henry Birchenough, GCMG (1853 –1937), English public servant; President of the British South Africa Company (1925–1937)
- L. Paul Bremer (b. 1941), U.S. Civil Administrator in Iraq (2003–2004)
- Caroline, Princess of Hanover, princess of the Principality of Monaco; daughter of American actress Grace Kelly
- Sir Austen Chamberlain, British Foreign Secretary (1924–1929); 1925 winner of the Nobel Peace Prize
- Yves-Thibault de Silguy, EU Commissioner for Economic and Financial Affairs
- Božidar Đelić, vice-president of the government of Serbia, 2007–
- Alain Destexhe, Belgian liberal senator and author
- Stéphane Dion, former leader of the Liberal Party of Canada and former Canadian Minister of Foreign Affairs.
- Roland Dumas (1922–2024), French Minister of Foreign Affairs (1984–1993)
- William Eagleton, representative of UN Secretary-General for Western Sahara; erstwhile US ambassador to Syria
- Joaquim do Espirito Santo, ambassador of Angola to the United States
- James Foley, United States Ambassador to Haiti (2003–2005), United States Ambassador to Croatia (2009–2012)
- Jamieson Greer, United States Trade Representative (2025–present)
- Ahmad Kamal, Pakistani ambassador to the United Nations
- Bernard Landry, former Premier of Quebec
- Ertuğrul Osman, pretender to the title of Sultan of the Ottoman Empire; head of the house of Osmanli (1994–2009)
- Sam Rainsy, Cambodian opposition leader; Member of Parliament
- Leon Reich, member of the Sejm of Poland
- Charles Rizk, Lebanese justice minister (2005–)
- Nano Ružin, Macedonian professor of political and social sciences, Ex-Macedonian Ambassador to NATO, and presidential candidate of the Liberal Democratic Party in 2009
- Afif Safieh, Palestinian ambassador to the US, regarded as the most articulate living Palestinian diplomat
- Nawaf Salam, ambassador and permanent representative of Lebanon to the United Nations
- Ghassan Salamé, former Minister of Culture of Lebanon (2000–2003); prolific author on Middle East politics
- Ieng Sary, deputy Prime Minister and Foreign Minister of Democratic Kampuchea, 1975–1979
- Brad Setser, former Deputy Secretary in the US Treasury Department
- Mike Schmuhl, manager for the Pete Buttigieg 2020 presidential campaign
- Sally Shelton-Colby, assistant administrator of the Bureau for Global Programs, Field Support, and Research in the US Department of State, erstwhile US ambassador to Grenada and Barbados
- Joan E. Spero, Under Secretary of State for Economic, Business, and Agricultural Affairs
- Jonas Gahr Støre, Norwegian Minister of Health and Care Services; former Minister of Foreign Affairs (2005–2012)
- Francis Orlando Wilcox (1908–1985), Assistant Secretary of State of the USA (1955–1961)
- Stanley Woodward, US Ambassador to Canada (1950–1953)
- Salome Zurabishvili, former French diplomat, former Minister of Foreign Affairs of Georgia and the current leader of the United Georgian Opposition
- Thanat Khoman, Thai Minister of Foreign Affairs 1959–1971 and Deputy Prime Minister 1981–1983
- Joseph Ki-Zerbo, Burkinabé advocate for African independence
- Władysław Grabski, Prime Minister of Poland 1920, 1923–1925
- Henri d'Orléans, Orléanist pretender to the French throne

==== France ====
- Ministers (N.B. This is a small selection given the large number of Fifth Republic ministers who studied at the institute.)
  - Martine Aubry, former French Minister for Social Affairs, mayor of Lille (in French: Martine Aubry)
  - Dominique Baudis, French MP and former mayor of Toulouse (in French: Dominique Baudis)
  - Jean-Louis Bourlanges, member of the European Parliament; vice-président of the UDF
  - Jean-Pierre Chevènement, former French Minister of Interior
  - Bernadette Chirac, former First Lady of France; Representative in Corrèze General Council; chairwoman of Fondation Hôpitaux de Paris; wife of former French president Jacques Chirac
  - Renaud Denoix de Saint Marc, vice-president of the Council of State
  - Olivier Duhamel, former member of the European Parliament; former Member of the European Convention (in French: Olivier Duhamel)
  - Hervé Gaymard, former French Minister of Finance
  - Jean-Marcel Jeanneney, former Minister of Industry, French ambassador to Algeria
  - Jack Lang, former French Minister of Culture and Education
  - Emmanuel Macron, Minister of the Economy, Industry and Digital Affairs and now President of France
  - Xavier Musca, director of the French Treasury; Director-General of the French Treasury and Economic Development Department (2002–present)
  - Jean Peyrelevade, civil servant, politician and business leader
  - Ségolène Royal, a defeated 2007 presidential candidate
  - Hubert Védrine, former French Minister of Foreign Affairs (1997–2002)
  - Maurice Papon, French civil servant, Gaullist politician and Nazi collaborator
  - Bruno Retailleau, minister of State and of the interior (2024–), president of Les Républicains (2025–)
- Diplomats (N.B. This is a small selection given that almost every diplomat since the inception of the Fifth Republic studied at the institute.)
  - Hervé Alphand, erstwhile French ambassador to the United States, UN, NATO, and the OEEC
  - Roland de Margerie, former ambassador of France to Germany
  - Xavier de La Chevalerie, former ambassador, chief of staff of the president (1967–1969)
  - Gérard Errera, ambassador of France to the United Kingdom (2002–present)
  - André François-Poncet, former ambassador of France to Germany
  - Dominique Girard, ambassador of France to India
  - Daniel Jouanneau, ambassador of France to Canada (2004–present)
  - Jean-David Levitte (b. 1946), ambassador of France to the USA (2002–present); Permanent Representative of France to the United Nations (2000–2002)
  - Claude Martin, ambassador of France to Germany (2001–present)
  - Jean-Maurice Ripert, former Permanent Representative of France to the United Nations, Ambassador of France to Russia, and Ambassador of France to China
  - Luis Vassy, former ambassador of France to the Netherlands; Director of Sciences Po
- Advisors:
  - Charline Avenel, Rector of Versailles Academy from 2018 to 2023.
  - Anastasia Colosimo (born c. 1990), International Press Advisor since 2023.
  - Ismaël Emelien (born c. 1987), Advisor to Emmanuel Macron
  - Jean Messiha (born 1970), Advisor to the National Front
  - Alain Minc, (born 1949), Advisor to Nicolas Sarkozy
- Members of the European Parliament:
  - Raphaël Glucksmann - chair, Special Committee on Foreign Interference in all Democratic Processes in the European Union
  - Manon Aubry - chair of The Left in the European Parliament
- President of regional council:
  - Marie-Guite Dufay (born 1949), president of Bourgogne-Franche-Comté (2016–)
  - Alain Rousset (born 1951), president of Nouvelle-Aquitaine (2016–)
  - Hervé Morin (born 1961), president of Normandie (2016–), former minister of defense (2007–2010)
  - Valérie Pecresse (born 1967), president of Ile-de-France (2015–), former minister of higher education and research (2007–2011)
  - Franck Leroy (born 1963), president of Grand-Est (2022–)
  - Jean-Paul Huchon (born 1946), president of Ile-de-France (1998–2015), chief of staff to the prime minister (1988–1991)
  - Laurent Wauquiez (born 1975), president of Auvergne-Rhone-Alpes (2016–2024), minister of higher education and research (2011–2012), president of Les Républicains (2017–2019)
  - Josselin de Rohan (born 1938), president of Bretagne (1998–2004), senator (1983–2011), 14th Duke of Rohan
  - Jean-Pierre Soisson (1934–2024), president of Bourgogne (1998–2004)

== Academia, journalism and literature ==
- Luis López Álvarez, Spanish poet, writer, and professor
- Raymond Aron
- Olivier Auroy, novelist
- Jean-Pierre Azéma
- Frédéric Beigbeder, novelist
- Derek Bok, president of Harvard University
- Fernand Braudel
- Emmanuel Carrère
- Hélène Carrère d'Encausse, specialist of Russia, member of the Académie Française
- Louis Chauvel
- Vincent Chauvet
- Houchang E. Chehabi, professor
- Paul Claudel, writer
- Jean-Marie Colombani, head of Le Monde
- Michèle Cotta
- Michel Crozier
- Guillaume Dustan
- Pierre Drieu La Rochelle
- Alain Duhamel, senior journalist at Le Monde and Libération
- Jean-Paul Fitoussi, French economist
- Matthew Fraser, editor-in-chief of National Post (Canada)
- Jacques Frémontier (born surname Friedman; 1930–2020), French journalist and television producer
- Erhard Friedberg
- Jacques Généreux
- Pierre Georges
- Hala Gorani, CNN journalist and anchorwoman
- Julien Gracq, novelist
- Nicolas Grenier, poet
- Stanley Hoffmann, professor at Harvard University
- Adrienne Jablanczy
- Christophe Jaffrelot
- Rebecca Jarvis, finalist on The Apprentice, Season Four; reporter on CNBC
- Stanley Karnow, Pulitzer Prize-winning author on Southeast Asia; Fellow at the Council on Foreign Relations
- Gilles Kepel
- Grayson Kirk, political scientist; president of Columbia University (1953–1968)
- Marc Lambron, novelist
- Bruno Latour
- Marc Lazar
- Yvette Lebas-Guyot, journalist and World War II commander
- Bernard-Henri Lévy, bestselling French writer; philosopher; political campaigner
- Paul Morand
- Anne Muxel
- Christine Ockrent, broadcast journalist
- Érik Orsenna, member of the Académie Française; former chief economic advisor to François Mitterrand
- Roger Peyrefitte, novelist
- Christian Prade-Thomas, President Private University Président d'université privée
- Marcel Proust, novelist
- Edmond Marc du Rogoff, (a.k.a. Edmundo Marcos Rogoff) ancien professeur agregé, Université d'Ottawa
- David Pujadas
- René Rémond, historian, member of the Académie Française
- Jean-Christophe Rufin, novelist
- Russ Rymer, editor-in-chief of Mother Jones magazine
- Robert B. Silvers, co-editor of The New York Review of Books
- Anne Sinclair
- Jared Taylor
- Milana Terloeva, Chechen journalist and bestselling author
- Maurice Vaïsse
- Edwy Plenel, founder and director of Mediapart
- Georges Vedel
- Florian Zeller, novelist, Prix Interallié 2004
- Hayeon Lim, South Korean socialite and author
- Élie Halévy, French philosopher and historian
- Pierre Hassner, Romanian-French geopolitologist and philosopher, director emeritus of Research at the Sciences Po Center for International Studies and Research
- Ma Jianzhong, author of the first Chinese grammar textbook written by a Chinese
- Pierre Milza, French historian, specialist in history of Italy and fascism
- Jean-Luc Parodi, French political scientist
- Pierre Renouvin, French historian of international relations
- Ian Goldin, British economist, former Distinguished Visiting professor at Sciences Po, Founding Director of the Oxford Martin School
- Elise Buckle, French environmentalist and professor at the Graduate Institute of International and Development Studies for the Executive Programme Graduate Institute of Geneva.
- Sibyle Veil, President of Radio France
- Jean Fourastié, french economist
- Bernat Manciet, Occitan author
- Marcel Boiteux, economist, architect of the French nuclear program
- Jean-Fraçois Deniau, member of the Académie Française, European Commissioner
- Juliette de La Genière, archeologist
- Jean Blondel, political scientist

== Business and finance ==
- Wilfried Baumgartner, governor of the Bank of France
- Jean-Hugues Bittner, CFO of Morgan Stanley Europe
- Michel Bon, former CEO of France Telecom and current CEO of Carrefour
- Daniel Bouton, former CEO of Société Générale
- Gerardo Braggiotti, CEO of Lazard LLC, Italy
- Nicolas Calemard, Director of Human Resources, LVMH
- Philippe Camus, CEO of European Aeronautic Defense and Space Company
- Richard Descoings, former CEO and director of Sciences Po
- Romain Durand, CEO of Scor VIE
- Henri Giscard d'Estaing, CEO of Club Med
- Jean-Marc Espalioux, CEO of Accor, European leader and one of the world's largest hotel groups
- Elizabeth Fleuriot, CEO of Kellogg's France
- Michel Gardel, CEO of Toyota France
- Pierre-Yves Gerbeau, CEO of X-Leisure
- Frédéric Jolly, chairman of Russell for Europe, the Middle East, and Africa
- Jean-Pierre Jouyet, Director-General of the French Treasury and Economic Development Department
- Jacques de Larosière, former president of the European Bank for Reconstruction and Development
- Frédéric Lemoine, former CEO of Capgemini
- Gérard Mestrallet, CEO of Suez
- Léone-Noëlle Meyer, chairman of Galeries Lafayette from 1998 to 2005
- Thierry Moulonguet, CFO and Executive VP of Renault
- Marcin Obroniecki, former CEO of Polish Agency for Audit Supervision, Vice President of Monte Vero Audit and Advisory, a Polish audit firm
- Frédéric Oudéa, CEO of Société Générale
- Laurence Parisot, "boss of the bosses", former president of the MEDEF (ex-CNPF), director of the IFOP, CEO of Optimum
- Guillaume Pepy, President of SNCF, the French national railway company
- David René de Rothschild, chairman of N M Rothschild & Sons
- François Roussely, CEO of Credit Suisse France; vice-chairman of Credit Suisse Europe
- Javier Santiso, economist at the OECD, former Chief Economist for Latin America at BBVA
- Marie-Laure Sauty de Chalon, marketing executive and CEO of the aufeminin.com group
- Louis Schweitzer, former CEO of Renault
- Ernest-Antoine Seillière, "boss of the bosses", president of the MEDEF (ex-CNPF)
- Jean-Cyril Spinetta, CEO of Air France
- Anne-Claire Tattinger, CEO of Société du Louvre, major luxury hotel and luxury goods company
- Agnès Touraine, CEO of Act III Consultants; former CEO of Havas and Vivendi Universal Publishing
- Jean-Claude Trichet, president of the European Central Bank (2003–2011), former governor of the Bank of France (1993–2003)
- Alex Vieux, CEO and founder of technology conference sponsor DASAR; publisher of Red Herring magazine
- Marc Vincent, director of Credit Suisse, former managing director at Citigroup France
- Serge Weinberg, CEO of Pinault Printemps Redoute, one of the world's largest luxury goods groups
- Alexandre Bompard, CEO of FNAC (2011–2017), CEO of Carrefour

== Culture and sports ==
- Fanny Ardant, internationally acclaimed French movie star
- Camille, born Camille Dalmais, singer and songwriter
- Pierre Christin, French comics creator and writer (Valérian and Laureline)
- Pierre de Coubertin, founder of the modern Olympic Games
- Christian Dior, haute couture and fashion designer
- Marc Drillech, sociologist and President of universities
- Jingjing Fan, fashion designer and founder of Elleme
- Léo Ferré, singer and songwriter
- Thierry Gilardi, football and rugby commentator
- Anna Hopkins, actress
- Kimon Evan Marengo, British cartoonist
- Marc du Pontavice, cinematographic and animation producer and CEO of Xilam
- Rafaela Reyes-Chaboussou, Academy Award-winning actress
- Teddy Riner, World Championships winner judoka,
- Anne Roumanoff, comedian
- Manvi Khosla, singer
- Jake Arnstein, diplomat and rugby star
- Élisabeth Boselli
- Serge Klarsfeld, Nazi hunter
- Éric de Moulins-Beaufort, Archbishop of Reims, president of the Bishops' Conference of France (2019–2025)
