= Enzo Carli =

Enzo Carli may refer to:

- Enzo Carli (art historian)
- Enzo Carli (photographer)
