= Mario Salmi =

Italian art historian and art critic

Mario Salmi (San Giovanni Valdarno, 14 June 1889 – Rome, 16 November 1980) was an Italian art historian and art critic who specialized in Romanesque architecture, Tuscan sculpture and the early Italian Renaissance.

== Life and work ==
After completing his laurea thesis in Law at the University of Pisa in 1910 on the problems of the protection of the artistic heritage in Italy, Salmi specialized in art history at the University of Rome under Adolfo Venturi. He was appointed professor of art history first at the University of Pisa, where he established the Istituto di Storia dell'Arte, which opened in 1929, then at the University of Florence, where he founded the Istituto Nazionale di Studi sul Rinascimento in 1937. From 1950 to 1964, he was professor of art history at the University of Rome, where he primarily taught Renaissance and Medieval art but also, for some years, modern art.

Salmi's work was mainly focused on Romanesque art and Renaissance art, with a particular fondness for the work of Piero della Francesca. However, apart from these main areas of interest, he ranged over a much wider field of art historical studies, from early Christian art to Baroque art, even managing to focus his interest on areas and periods hitherto neglected or undervalued by most other critics, such as Coptic art. In 1952, he founded the "Centro italiano di studi sull'alto medioevo". Always critical in his approach, he also put his attention to the so-called minor arts.

In 1949, Salmi established the art review journal Commentari. He was also supervisor of the 15-volume Enciclopedia Universale dell'Arte, published from 1958 to 1967, which was soon translated into English as The Encyclopedia of World Art.

Salmi influenced many of his students at the universities of Pisa, Florence and Rome, including Alessandro Marabottini, Enzo Carli, Umberto Baldini, John Carandente, Mirella Levi D'Ancona, among them.

His papers and photographs collection are held at the Getty Research Institute, Los Angeles, California.

== Select publications ==
- (with Basile Khvoshinsky), I pittori toscani dal XIII al XVI secolo, 2 vols. (1912–14)
- The "Last Supper" by Leonardo da Vinci and the church of "Le Grazie" in Milan (1926)
- L'architettura romanica in Toscana (1928)
- La scultura romanica in Toscana (1928)
- Romanesque sculpture in Tuscany (1928)
- Masaccio (1935)
- Paolo Uccello, Andrea del Castagno, Domenico Veneziano (1936)
- L'Abbazia di Pomposa (1938)
- Il Palazzo dei Cavalieri e la Scuola normale superiore di Pisa (1932)
- L'arte italiana, 3 vols. (1940-1942)
- Piero della Francesca e il Palazzo ducale di Urbino (1945)
- Masaccio, Masolino, Filippino Lippi (1945)
- Disegni di Francesco di Giorgio nella collezione Chigi Saracini (1947)
- Luca Signorelli (1955)
- Grandi maestri del'400 (1950)
- Lezioni di storia dell'arte medievale (1950)
- La Basilica di San Salvatore di Spoleto (1951)
- Masaccio (1951)
- L'arte italiana (1952)
- La miniatura fiorentina gotica (1954)
- San Domenico e San Francesco in Arezzo (1954)
- Italian miniatures (1954)
- La miniatura italiana (1956)
- Italienische Buchmalerie (1956)
- L'enluminure italienne (1956)
- Cosmè Tura (1957)
- Enciclopedia universale dell'arte, 15 vols. (1958-1967)
- Encyclopedia of World Art, 15 vols (1959-1968)
- La chiesa inferiore di San Francesco di Arezzo di Mario Salmi (1960)
- Andrea del Castagno (1961)
- Romanische Kirchen in der Toskana (1961)
- The Abbey of Pomposa (1965)
- (with Charles de Tolnay), Michelangelo: artista, pensatore, scrittore, 2 vols. (1965)
- (with Charles de Tolnay) Drawings of Michelangelo: 103 Drawings in Facsimile (1965)
- (with Raffaello De Ruggieri), Le chiese rupestri di Matera (1966)
- Michelangelo (1966)
- The Complete Work of Michelangelo, 2 vols. (1966)
- Civiltà fiorentina del primo Rinascimento (1967)
- Enrico Barfucci (1968)
- Mito e realtà di Leonardo (1968)
- Civiltà artistica della terra aretina (1971)
- Grimani Breviary (1974)
- La pittura di Piero della Francesca (1979)
- Parvae Favillae. Scritti di storia dell'arte dal Tardo Antico al Barocco. Edited by Maria Cristina Castelli and Maria Grazia Ciardi-Dupré Dal Poggetto (1989)
- Storie di Bizzoche: tra Umbria e Marche (1995)
- (with Luisa Becherucci, Alessandro Marabottini and Anna Forlani Tempesti), Raffaello (Raphael) (1999)
