= Orcel =

Orcel is a surname. Notable people with the surname include:

- Andrea Orcel (born 1963), Italian investment banker
- Bernard Orcel (born 1945), French skier
- Claire Orcel (born 1997), French and Belgian high jumper
- Jean Orcel (1896–1978), French mineralogist
- Michel Orcel (born 1952), French writer, publisher, and psychoanalyst
