= Yosuke Nagai =

Japanese social worker

Yōsuke Nagai
- Citizenship: Japanese
- Education: Master's degree in Conflict Studies from the London School of Economics and Political Science, PhD, Waseda University
- Known for: Founder and Executive Director of Accept International and Global Taskforce for Youth Combatants
- Website: https://accept-int.org/en/ https://gt4y.org/

Yosuke Nagai (永井陽右, Nagai Yōsuke, born in 1991) is the founder and executive director of Accept International.

He serves as a visiting fellow at the University of Oxford, a member of the Youth Advisory Board of the United Nations Human Settlements Programme(UN-Habitat).

== Biography ==
He was born and raised in Kanagawa Prefecture, Japan.

Nagai graduated from Waseda University's School of Education in 2015. He holds a master's in Conflict Studies from the London School of Economics and Political Science and a Ph.D. in Social Science from Waseda University.

When he was a student at Waseda University, he launched a student group, 'Japan-Somalia Youth Organization' in September 2011 to address issues in conflict-ridden Somalia, which eventually led to the creation of Accept International.

== Work ==
=== Accept International ===
Nagai is the founder and executive director of Accept International, a Japan-based international non-governmental organization. Accept International runs deradicalization, reintegration, and rehabilitation programs for youth associated with non-state armed groups and ‘surrender hotline’, offering refuge to those trying to escape non-state armed groups, primarily in conflict zones such as Somalia and Yemen. Accept International established an original human rights-based framework, the “Re-define, Prepare, Action” (RPA) model. This model was selected as one of the 100 solutions for peace at the Paris Peace Forum 2020 and featured by One Young World.

He leads efforts in developing new international norms, driving critical global discussions regarding the rights and empowerment of Youth Associated with Non-State Armed Groups, engaging stakeholders worldwide. The organization focuses on protecting and empowering young individuals involved with non-state armed groups or violent extremist organizations, enabling their reintegration into society as agents of peace

=== United Nations / International Agencies ===
Nagai serves as a mentor of the United Nations Human Settlements Programme, Social Inclusion and Human Rights Unit, and a member of a Youth Advisory Board, an Expert Group Meeting, and a Technical Working Group within various UN agencies.

He serves as a visiting fellow at the Geneva Academy of International Humanitarian Law and Human Rights, and the University of Oxford.
