= Accept International =

International non-governmental organization

Accept International is an international non-governmental organization (INGO) founded by Yosuke Nagai, aiming at achieving a society free of terrorism and armed conflict, with its headquarters in Japan. The organization's stated purpose is "Empowering everyone as agents of peace, together we will break the chains of violence".

It promotes deradicalization, reintegration, and rehabilitation of combatants, gang members, defectors, prisoners, and detainees from non-state armed groups—particularly those involved in violent extremism—in regions such as Somalia, Yemen, Kenya, Indonesia, Colombia, and Palestine. It engages these individuals through support systems and direct outreach, including a surrender hotline that offers safe passage to those seeking to leave violent extremist organizations. It was originally founded as a student-led "Japan Somalia Youth Organization" in 2011 at Waseda University to address issues in conflict-ridden Somalia. In 2017, the name was changed to "Accept International" with the idea of 'accepting rather than excluding' as an official nonprofit. It holds a Special Consultative Status with the United Nations Economic and Social Council (ECOSOC).

== Awards and nominations ==
- 2014 The 28th JCI JAPAN TOYP (The Outstanding Young Persons)
- 2014 Encouragement Award from the Minister of Foreign Affairs
- 2018 Selected in Forbes Japan "30 UNDER 30 JAPAN 2018"
- 2020 Peace and Security Category at the Paris Peace Forum 2020
- 2020 Received Peace Award at "King Hamad Youth Empowerment Award to Achieve the SDGs" hosted by UNDP
- 2020 The 55th Social Contribution Awards (The Nippon Foundation Prize)
- 2022 Nakasone Peace Institute Encouragement Awards
- 2023 The 2nd SDGs Japan Scholarship Iwasa Award
- 2025 The 28th Chikyu Rinri Suishin Awards
