= Mirella Levi D'Ancona =

Italian-born American art historian (1919–2014)

- Born: June 7, 1919; Florence, Italy
- Died: March 2, 2014 (aged 94); Florence, Italy
- Education: University of Florence, New York University Institute of Fine Arts
- Employer: Hunter College (1959–1986)
- Known for: art historian, professor

Mirella Levi D'Ancona (June 7. 1919 – March 2, 2014) was an Italian-born American professor and art historian. She was professor emeritus at Hunter College (from 1959–1986) in art history. D’Ancona did critical research on iconography of animal, floral and vegetable symbolism on art from the Late Middle Ages period to the Renaissance.

== Biography ==
Mirella Levi D’Ancona was born on 7 June 1919 in Florence, Italy, the daughter of Flora Aghib (1895–1982) and Ezio Levi D’Ancona (1884–1941). Her grandfather was writer Alessandro d'Ancona.

She attended high school at Giambattista Vico State High School in Naples. D’Ancona started her college studies at University of Naples (Università di Napoli), later transferring to University of Florence (Università di Firenze) where she graduated in 1941 with a degree in art history. Mario Salmi was her thesis advisor, and her thesis was focused on Francesco d’Antonio Del Chierico.

In 1944, D’Ancona fled to Switzerland with her brothers due to the uprising of fascism and racial laws. In 1946, she moved to New York City to join her mother, who was already living there. She took various odd jobs upon arrival, eventually becoming the assistant to Richard Offner of New York University Institute of Fine Arts. She eventually registered as a PhD student at New York University Institute of Fine Arts.

In 1959, D’Ancona took a position as a professor of History of Modern Art at Hunter College, City University of New York and by 1972 she was a full professor. She remained there until 1986, eventually earning the title professor emeritus. After her retirement in 1986, she moved back to Florence.

== Publications ==
- D'Ancona, Mirella Levi (1977). The Garden of the Renaissance: Botanical Symbolism in Italian Painting. Florence, Italy: Leo S. Olschki.

== See also ==
- Women in the art history field
