= Umberto Baldini =

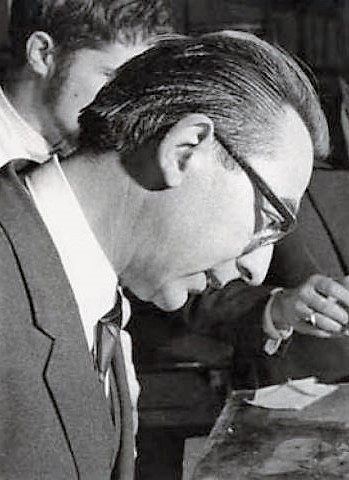
Umberto Baldini

Umberto Baldini (9 November 1921 – 16 August 2006) was an art historian and specialist in the theory of art restoration.

He earned a degree in art history with professor Mario Salmi, entered into service as inspector of the Soprintendenza of Florence, and in 1949 became director of the Gabinetto di Restauro. In this capacity, he was tasked with managing the emergency of the 1966 flood of Florence that damaged many masterpieces. The result of these interventions consecrated to the world the techniques and methodology of the so-called "Florentine school" of restoration.

In 1970, he became the first director of the Opificio delle Pietre Dure. From 1983 to 1987 he was the director of the Istituto Centrale per il Restauro (now the Istituto Superiore per la Conservazione ed il Restauro) in Rome and, in these years, he led the restoration of the Brancacci Chapel in the church of Santa Maria del Carmine in Florence.

He was then named President of the Università Internazionale dell'Arte in Florence, and director of the Horne Museum, also in Florence.

== Role in the 1966 Florence flood ==
During the 1966 flood of the Arno River in Florence, Baldini directed the Gabinetto di Restauro in Florence and coordinated emergency conservation work on artworks damaged by water, mud and fuel oil. He supervised teams of conservators and volunteers involved in the recovery and restoration of numerous paintings and objects from Florentine museums and churches, including collections associated with the Uffizi Gallery. The restoration programmes he developed contributed to the development of modern conservation methodologies now associated with the Florentine school of restoration.Baldini, U. "Umberto Baldini". Dictionary of Art Historians."Umberto Baldini, 84; Led effort to restore art after 1966 flood of Florence". Los Angeles Times. 23 August 2006.

== Publications ==
- Teoria del restauro e unità di metodologia (2 volumes). Florence, Nardini Editore, 1978-1981.
- Metodo e Scienza: operatività e ricerca nel restauro. Florence, Sansoni, 1982.
- Masaccio. Electa, 2001.
