= Enzo Carli (art historian) =

Italian art historian

Enzo Carli (20 August 1910 - 26 September 1999) was an Italian art historian and art critic.

== Life ==
Born in Pisa, he studied at the University of Pisa under Mario Salmi and Matteo Marangoni. His graduation thesis was on the sculptor Tino di Camaino (1285-1337). In 1937 he was made superintendent of Aquila and two years later moved to Siena, where he taught art history at the University of Siena and was director of the Pinacoteca Nazionale until 1952 and of the Museo dell'Opera Metropolitana del Duomo until 1973.

In 1980 he received the President of the Republic's Prize as a member emeritus of the Accademia dei Lincei. In 1995 that Accademia awarded him the Feltrinelli Prize for art criticism and poetry. He died in Siena and is buried in Pisa's Camposanto monumentale. In September 2000 his children donated the Fondo Enzo Carli to the University of Siena, depositing around 5000 pieces of his correspondence, manuscripts, photographs, typescripts and prints dating from 1928 to 1996 in that university's literature department library.

== Works ==
- Michelangelo, Bergamo, Ist. ital. d'arti grafiche, 1942.
- Vetrata Duccesca, Milano-Firenze, Electa, 1946.
- Brunelleschi, Milano-Firenze, Electa, 1952.
- La scultura lignea senese, Firenze, Electa Editrice, 1954.
- Ambrogio Lorenzetti, Ivrea, C. Olivetti, 1954.
- I primitivi Senesi, Milano, Ed. Electa, 1956.
- Sassetta e il « Maestro dell'Osservanza », Milano, 1957.
- Pittura senese, Milano, Off. Graf. Ricordi, 1964.
- Il Pinturicchio, Milano, Electa, 1960.
- L'Abbazia di Monteoliveto, Milano, Electa, 1961.
- I primitivi : dipinti su tavola, Milano, Silvana editoriale d'arte, 1963.
- Tozzi, Torino, Bolaffi, 1976.
- La scultura di Michelangiolo, s.l., published by the Comitato aretino in honour of the 500th anniversary of Michelangelo's birth, 1976.
- I Lorenzetti, Milano, Fabbri, 1977.
- Giovanni Pisano, Pisa, Pacini, 1977.
- La Pittura italiana : Medioevo, Vicenza, Banca Popolare di Vicenza, 1979.
- Venanzo Crocetti, s.l., Federazione delle Cassa di risparmio degli Abruzzi e del Molise, 1979.
- Omaggio a Emilio Greco, Pienza, Comune di Pienza, 1979.
- Gli scultori senesi, s.l., Monte dei Paschi di Siena, 1980.
- Pittura italiana : l'Ottocento, Bologna, Banca cooperativa, 1980.
- Pittori senesi del Quattrocento, Firenze, Giunti-Nardini, 1985.
- La pittura italiana : dal Medioevo al Novecento, Modena, Banca popolare dell'Emilia; Milan : Martello, 1985.
- La scultura italiana, Vicenza, Banca popolare di Vicenza, 1985-87.
- Giotto : la Cappella degli Scrovegni, Milano, Martello, 1987.
- Duccio, Milano, Electa, 1999.
- Inventario pisano, Pisa, ETS, 2014.

=== Works translated into French ===
- (in French) La Peinture gothique.
- (in French) Les Tablettes peintes de la "Biccherna" et de la "Gabella" de l'ancienne république de Sienne, Milano-Firenze, Electa Editrice, 1951 (description and reproduction of 124 paintings in the Archivio dello Stato di Siena).
- (in French) La sculpture siennoise en Bois, Milano-Firenze, Electa, 1954.
- (in French) Les Primitifs Siennois - Scuola Senese - Duccio - Ugolino di Nerio - Simone Martini - Lippo Memmi - Barna - Pietro Lorenzetti - Ambrogio Lorenzetti - Bartolo Di Fredi - Paolo Di Giovanni Fei ..., Parigi, Éditions Braun & Cie, 1957.
- (in French) La Maestà, Duccio di Buoninsegna, Siena, l'Oeuvre métropolitaine-Milano, Aldo Martello, 1969.
- (in French) Le Dôme de Sienne et le Musée de l'Oeuvre, Firenze, Scala, c 1976.
- (in French) Peinture en Occident, les maîtres de Florence.
- (in French) Fresques de Sienne.
- (in French) Siennes, guide touristique de la ville et de la province.
- (in French) La Peinture siennoise, translated by Juliette Bertrand.
- (in French) Bois sculptés polychromes du XIIe au XVIe siècle en Italie.
- (in French) Les Grands Maîtres toscans du XIVe siècle.
- (in French) Les Primitifs sur bois.
- (in French) Le Paysage dans l'art, translated by Michel Orcel, Parigi, Fernand Nathan, 1980 ISBN 2-09-284563-2

=== Works translated into German ===
- (in German) Sienesische Malerei. s.l., Fiorentini, 1982.

=== Works translated into English ===
- Sassetta's Borgo San Sepolcro Altarpiece, "Burlington Magazine", n. 43, 1951.
- Sienese Painting, Greenwich (Conn.), New York Graphic Society, 1957.
- Sienese painting, Firenze, Scala Books, 1982.

== Bibliography (in Italian) ==
- A. Olivetti, Un umanista del Novecento, «Il manifesto», 26 ottobre 1999, p. 22.
- R. Barzanti, Enzo Carli (1910-1999), «Bullettino senese di storia patria», a. CV, 2000, pp. 641–643.
- W. Loseries (a cura di), Bibliografia di Enzo Carli, Firenze, Kunstistorisches Institut in Florenz, 1989.
- In memoria di Enzo Carli, «Bullettino senese di storia patria», a. CVI, 2001.
- R. Barzanti, Per Enzo Carli, «Accademia dei Rozzi», a. XIII, n. 25, 2006, pp. 3–5.
