= Michel Orcel =

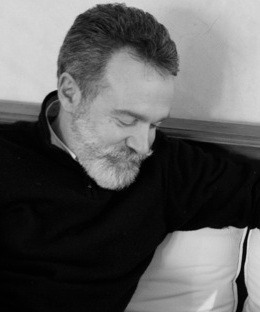
- Born: 1952 (age 73–74)

Michel Orcel (born 1952, in Marseille) is a contemporary French writer, publisher and psychoanalyst.

== Biography ==
After studying classical literature at the Jesuits in Marseille, Michel Orcel graduated from the Institut d'études politiques de Paris (Public Service department., class 1974), he gave up his preparation studies to the ENA and moved to the Sorbonne: he obtained a master's degree in philosophy under the direction of Claude Tresmontant) and a DEA in Islamology under the direction of Roger Arnaldez, he finally defended a doctoral thesis in Literature and Human Sciences (Italian Studies, directed by Mario Fusco) and obtained in 1996 his authorization to direct doctoral research (University of Tours).

At the same time, he began a career as a literary journalist and music critic at VOGUE, Avant-Sène Opéra, etc.

Orcel was a researcher at the European University Institute at Florence in 1976–1977 (seminars of teachers Charles Wilson and Alphonse Dupront) and resident at the Académie de France à Rome. He was a lecturer at Rennes (1993–1997), where he founded a chair in the history of Italian opera.

After having animated for years, with Alain de Gourcuff, the magazine and the editions de L'Alphée, in 2015, he founded the ARCADES AMBO publishing house.

== Psychoanalysis ==
Trained in Paris and subsequently analysed by Jean-Pierre Maïdani Gérard (SPF, EPCI), Manuel Garcia Barroso (SPP), and Kathleen Kelley-Lainé (SPP), he practiced in Paris and Marrakech. He is a practicing member of the Société de psychanalyse freudienne (SPF).

== Essays ==
An Italianist, Orcel gave essential essays on Leopardi and the dark side of Italian literature. (Italie obscure), as well as on Verdi, of whom he is the most recent French biographer. In the field of Islamology, in addition to his travel books, he published in 2011 De la dignité de l'islam. Réfutation de quelques thèses de la nouvelle islamophobie chrétienne ("On the dignity of Islam. Refuting some of the theories of the new Christian Islamophobia"). Although regretting that this essay is similar to a controversial "pamphlet", the critics nevertheless welcome a useful book that presents a nuanced reading of the Quran. This book was followed by a much more neutral essay: L'Invention de l'islam, which provides an update on the traceable origins of this religion. Michel Orcel is also working on the emblematic, and in 2016 published Volume I of an article on the subject: Dictionnaire raisonné des devises (in coll. with Alban Pérès, éditions ARCADES AMBO, 2017), which lists and illustrates nearly 2,700 mottos.

== Literature ==
As an author of fiction (poetry, novels), essays, encyclopedic works, translations, Orcel has received the following awards: "Diego Valeri" (Italy), "Nelly Sachs", and "Jules Janin" prizes of the Académie française as well as the "Ortensia" prize of the S.I.D.E.F (Società Italiana dei Francesisti). In 2015, Michel Orcel had a "museum-book" published. : Le Val de Sigale. Pays d'Esteron et de Chanan à travers six siècles d'histoire (ARCADES AMBO). In November 2016 he published La Destruction de Nice at Pierre Guillaume de Roux editions as well as a booklet of translations from various languages Ô nuit pour moi si claire at the Dogana (Geneva).

== Trivia ==
Michel Orcel is a member of the Scientific Committee of the "Rivista Internazionale di Studi Leopardiani" (RISL), member of the "Association des Traducteurs Littéraires de France" (ATLF), member of the "Société Française d'Héraldique et de Sigillographie" (SFHS) and founder of the journal Recherches romanes et comparées in 1997. He was promoted a Commander to the Order of the Star of Italy in 2009. A candidate in René Girard's chair at the Académie française during the election on 17 November 2016, Michel Orcel obtained 3 votes in the first round, against 3 for Gonzague Saint Bris and 11 for Daniel Rondeau. This election, which did not end up in a majority result, was considered "blank" and postponed to a later date. This second election did not yield any majority results.

== Work ==
=== Poetry, essays, fiction, dictionaries ===
- Le Théâtre des nues, L'Alphée, Paris, 1981
- Les Liens, L'Alphée, Paris, 1982
- Élégie, suivi de Parva domus, La Dogana, Geneva, 1984
- Destin, Le Temps qu'il fait, Cognac, 1987
- Langue mortelle, foreword by Jean Starobinski, L’Alphée, Paris, 1987
- Odor di femina, Le temps qu'il fait, Cognac, 1989
- N. N. ou L’amour caché, Grasset, Paris, 1989
- Trois guerriers plus un, Le temps qu’il fait, Cognac, 1993
- Le Sentiment du fer, Grasset, Paris, 1994
- Histoire d'une ascension, Le temps qu'il fait, Cognac, 1996
- Italie obscure, Librairie Belin, Paris, 2001
- Verdi. La vie, le mélodrame, Grasset, 2001
- Les Larmes du traducteur, Grasset, Paris, 2002
- Voyage dans l’Orient prochain, La Bibliothèque, Paris, 2004
- Napoléon Promenade, Ed. du Rocher, Paris, mai 2007
- Le Livre des devises, Le Seuil, Paris, 2009
- De la dignité de l'islam. Réfutation de quelques thèses de la nouvelle islamophobie chrétienne, Bayard, Paris, 2011; réédition ARCADES AMBO, Paris-Nice, 2015
- L'invention de l'islam. Enquête historique sur les origines, Perrin, Paris, 2012
- Jardin funeste, ARCADES AMBO, Paris-Nice, 2015.
- Le Val de Sigale. Pays d'Esteron et de Chanan à travers six siècles d'histoire, ARCADES AMBO éd., Paris-Nice, 2015.
- La Destruction de Nice, proses, Pierre-Guillaume de Roux éditeur, Paris, 2016.
- Dictionnaire raisonné des devises (volume I), in collaboration with Alban Pérès, ARCADES AMBO éd., Nice, 2017.

=== Main translations ===
- Dix Petites Pièces philosophiques by Leopardi, Le Temps qu'il fait, Cognac, 1985 (2nd edition 1991; 3rd edition 2009).
- Poèmes et fragments by Leopardi, La Dogana, Geneva, 1987
- Poésies by Michelangelo, Imprimerie Nationale, Paris, 1993
- Trois Livrets pour Mozart by Da Ponte, foreword by J. Starobinski, Flammarion GF, Paris, 1994
- Chants / Canti by Leopardi, Flammarion, Paris, 1995 (reissued GF, 2005)
- Roland furieux by Ludovico Ariosto, Éditions du Seuil, Paris, 2000
- Jérusalem libérée by Torquato Tasso, Gallimard Folio, Paris, 2002
- Rimes et plaintes Tasso, Fayard, Paris, 2002
- Les Confessions d'un Italien by Ippolito Nievo, Fayard, Paris, 2006
- Sourates et fragments du Coran, La Bibliothèque, Paris, 2009
- Le Messager by Tasso, Verdier, Paris, 2012
- La Beffa di Buccari (Un pied de nez aux Autrichiens) by Gabriele d'Annunzio, La Bibliothèque, Paris, 2014
- Copernic (dialogue) by Leopardi, ARCADES AMBO, Paris-Nice, 2015
- Ô nuit pour moi si claire, booklet of translation (from Properce to Shelley), La Dogana, Geneva, 2016

== Bibliography ==
- "Michel Orcel" in Dictionnaire de poésie de Baudelaire à nos jours, PUF, Paris, 2001
- J.-P. Richard, Terrains de lecture, Éditions Gallimard, Paris, 1996
- J. Schwarz, Le Passage ou l'itinéraire d'un passeur en métamorphose dans "Les Larmes du traducteur" de Michel Orcel et "La Route de San Giovanni" d'Italo Calvino, mémoire de maîtrise, Paris III, June 2003.
- Bernard Simeone, Le Phénix de la consolation, in La Quinzaine littéraire, No 651, 16–31 July 1994
- B. Simeone, Une splendide errance, in La Quinzaine littéraire, No 769, 1630 November 2000
- B. Simeone, Verdi pessimiste et secret, in Tageblatt-Bücher/Livres, Luxembourg, 16 February 2001
