= Luisa Becherucci =

Italian museologist

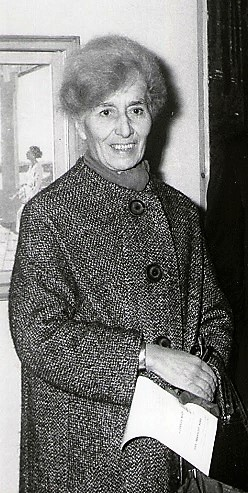
Becherucci in 1971

Luisa Becherucci (1904–1988) was an Italian art historian and museologist who served as director of the Uffizi Gallery in Florence from 1957 to 1969. Her directorship coincided with the 1966 flood of the Arno River, a major cultural disaster that affected Florence’s artistic heritage.

== Career ==
Becherucci specialised in art history and museum practice and was appointed director of the Uffizi Gallery in 1957, a position she held until 1969. During her tenure, she oversaw the management and preservation of one of Italy’s principal museum collections.

== Role in the 1966 Florence flood ==
On the night of 3–4 November 1966, when the Arno River flooded Florence, Becherucci went to the Uffizi Gallery to assist in safeguarding artworks and archival materials threatened by rising water. She coordinated emergency measures within the museum, including the protection and relocation of endangered objects.

The flood caused extensive damage to cultural heritage in Florence and prompted large-scale international restoration efforts. In the aftermath, Becherucci organised the exhibition Dipinti salvati dalla piena dell’Arno, which presented artworks recovered from the flood and documented early restoration efforts.

== Legacy ==
The response to the 1966 flood is widely regarded as a turning point in the history of art conservation, contributing to the development of modern restoration methods and international collaboration. As director of the Uffizi during this period, Becherucci was associated with institutional efforts supporting conservation and recovery.
