= Charline Avenel =

French official

- Born: Avenel; 24 May 1978 (age 48)
- Citizenship: French
- Education: Sciences Po; École nationale d'administration
- Occupation: Managing Director
- Years active: 2004–?
- Employer: IONIS Education Group
- Known for: Rector of the Versailles academy
- Predecessor: Marc Drillech
- Awards: Commander Chevalier

Charline Avenel (born 24 May 1978) is a senior French civil servant and the Rector of the Versailles Academy from 24 October 2018 to 13 July 2023.

== Biography ==
=== Youth and studies ===
Charline Avenel is a graduate of the Sciences Po. She is a former student of the École nationale d'administration, promotion 2002–2004 "Léopold Sédar Senghor".

=== Professional career ===
Charline Avenel began her career at the Ministry of Economy and Finance in the Budget Department (2004–2007), as assistant to the head of the education and higher education office.

In 2008, she was appointed budget advisor to Valérie Pécresse, Minister of Higher Education and Research, then deputy director of her cabinet.

She was then deputy chief of staff to Minister Laurent Wauquiez at the same ministry.

From 2012 to 2013, she was deputy director of the Agence nationale de la recherche.

In 2013, she was appointed Secretary General of the National Foundation for Political Science, which oversees the Sciences Po, by Frédéric Mion. She remained in this position for 5 years. She devoted herself to various files, including the acquisition of the Hôtel de l'Artillerie. She also created “Sciences Mômes”, an operation aimed at opening the doors of the institution to the children of employees. She took up the theme of gender equality by creating the first anti-harassment unit at Sciences Po.

A decree of October 24, 2018 appoints her rector of the Academy of Versailles (Yvelines, Essonne, Hauts-de-Seine, Val-d'Oise), the largest academy in France with 1,200,000 students and 100,000 staff, succeeding to Daniel Filâtre who is retiring.

She leaves her position in July 2023 to join the private higher education group Ionis.

Her management of the rectorat has been put under scrutiny, and investigation of her practices are ongoing as of September 2023 following the suicide of an harassed teenager, whose parents have been threatened to remain silent while their son was being harassed and before he committed suicide, by her administration under her tenure. Police and administrative investigation are ongoing, and it was found that several other parents have been issued letters which, the French national education Minister, Mr Gabriel Attal, has called "disgrace and shameful".

== Awards ==
- , Commandeur of the Ordre des Palmes Académiques
- , Chevalier of the Ordre des Arts et des Lettres
