= Anne Muxel =

French sociologist (born 1956)

Anne Muxel (born 1 December 1956) is a French sociologist more specialised in the study of the biographical memory. Her major sociological works concern politic socialisation, on one hand, and biographical roots of political and family behaviour, on the other hand. She is Research Director at the French National Center for Scientific Research (CNRS) and a senior research fellow in the Paris Institute of Political Studies, a French research institute specializing in political and economic sciences and, specifically, in political sociology.

== Publications ==
- 2010, « Avoir 20 ans en politique », Seuil, 237 p., Paris
- 2009, (avec Bruno Cautráes) « Comment Les electeurs Font-ils Leurs Choix : Le Panel electoral Francais 2007 », Seuil, 385 p., Paris, ISBN 9782724611076
- 2008, « Toi, Moi Et La Politique: Amour Et Convictions », Seuil, 282 p., Paris, ISBN 9782020962490 * 2005, « Les abstentionnistes : le premier parti européen », Pascal Perrineau (dir.), Le vote européen 2004-2005. De l’élargissement au référendum français, Presses de Sciences Po, Paris
- 2005, « Les jeunes et les élections européennes : un paradoxe démocratique ? », Delwit Pascal, Poirier Ph., Parlement puissant, électeurs absents ? Les élections européennes de juin 2004, Editions de l’université de Bruxelles, Bruxelles
- 2004, Les étudiants de Sciences Po. Leurs idées, leurs valeurs, leurs cultures politiques, Presses de Sciences Po, Paris
- 2003, « La poussée des abstentions : protestation, malaise, sanction », Pascal Perrineau, Ysmal Colette (dir.), Le vote de tous les refus. Les élections présidentielles et législatives de 2002, Presses de Sciences Po, Paris
- 2003, Les Étudiants de Sciences Po. Leurs idées, leurs valeurs, leurs cultures politiques, Presses de Sciences Po, Paris
- 2001, (codirection avec Marlaine Cacouault) Les Jeunes d’Europe du Sud et la politique. Une enquête comparative France, Italie, Espagne, L’Harmattan, 287 p., Paris
- 2001, L’Expérience politique des jeunes, Presses de Sciences Po, 190 p., Paris
- 1996, Individu et mémoire familiale, Nathan, 226 p., Paris
- 1996, Les Jeunes et la politique, Hachette, 134 p., Paris
