= Javier Santiso =

Spanish-born French economist (born 1969)

Javier Santiso

Javier Santiso (born 1969), is a Spanish-born French economist, investor, publisher, and educator. He is the CEO and general partner of Mundi Ventures, an international 500M VC fund, based in Madrid and with offices in Paris. He is also the founder of the art and publishing house La Cama Sol. Javier holds both Spanish and French nationalities. He is a leading economist on emerging markets, startups and venture capitals. He has authored several books (listed below) and papers published in leading referee journals and edited books published by Columbia University Press, Oxford University Press or Routledge. He is a member of the World Economic Forum Global Council on Latin America. In 2011 he was named as one of the most influential iberoamerican thinkers by Foreign Policy. He has been professor at Johns Hopkins University (Washington), Sciences Po (Paris), ESADE Business School (Barcelona) and IE Business School (Madrid).

== Early life and education ==
Javier Santiso holds several degrees from Sciences Po, France, including a PhD, an MBA from HEC School of Management (France). He finished his doctoral studies at University of Oxford, where he has been also a research fellow of the St Antony's College. He followed executive programs at IESE Business School (Spain) and at the Harvard Kennedy School (United States).

== Career ==
=== Teaching ===
He started his career in academia as a tenured Research Fellow at Sciences Po Paris and associate professor at SAIS Johns Hopkins University. He has been an emerging markets economist at Crédit Agricole Indosuez. After he became chief economist for emerging markets at BBVA where he developed and led a group of 50 economists spread in 9 different countries. Later he has been the Chief Development Economist and Director of the OECD Development Centre, a policy tank of 95 staff focused on Africa, Asia and Latin American emerging markets. He has been the younger director ever named at the OECD during the past 50 years of the organization. He was a visiting professor at Johns Hopkins University Paul H. Nitze School of Advanced International Studies. He gave lectures and presentations at Columbia University, Harvard University, Oxford University, London Business School, among others, and at annual conferences on emerging markets organized by The Economist (Brazil), The Financial Times (London), Munich Re (Munich), Coface (Paris), Investec Asset Management (Turkey) or Khazanah's sovereign wealth fund annual conference (Malaysia).

=== Investor, economist, and business career ===
He invests in deep tech, climate tech companies, IoT, cyber, AI, industrial internet and also insurtech and fintech in Europe & USA, in Paris, London, Berlin, Amsterdam, Stockholm, Madrid, Barcelona, Tel Aviv, New York, Palo Alto, Miami, Singapore, São Paulo. He run in the past the tech investments of Khazanah, the US$50 billion Asian sovereign fund, and invested in multi billion tech unicorns like Farfetch (London, a startup exited and listed in the Nasdaq), Skyscanner (Edinburgh, a startup also exited and bought by Ctrip) and others like Auto1 (Berlin, now listed in Francfort).

He is an independent board member of Paris Based listed company FNAC Darty and also a member of the board of Madrid based Prisa, the owner or El Pais, La Ser and Santillana. He invested in a dozen of unicorns included Wefox in Berlin, Bolttech in Singapore, Shift Technology in Paris, Job&Talent in Madrid or Betterfly in Santiago de Chile and seats also in several art and cultural trustees like El Prado Museum, Teatro Real Opera, and Real Academia de Bellas Artes de San Fernando.

He is a Young Global Leader (YGL) of the World Economic Forum (Davos), and founder of the Club Mundi, a +750 network of Spanish and Foreign executives both working abroad and in Spanish multinationals or foreigners linkedin with Spain ("los argonautas"). Formerly he has been also managing director at Telefónica where he worked with the current chairman, José María Alvarez Pallete and set up the venture capital fund of funds (Amerigo, 400M Euros), worked on Wayra, the startup accelerators network worldwide and created Talentum, the hackers program.

He founded in the past of Start Up Spain, the leading platform on startups and ventures powered in cooperation with Rafael del Pino Foundation, in total 10 sessions created across several years. He is also interested in the interactions between artificial intelligence and emotional intelligence and plans a Forum where corporate leaders, startups founders and visual artists will be brought together, around art & technology, along also a publications that will question the living world around technologies from the point of view of poets, artists, chefs, etc.

In 2010, he joined Telefónica International as a Director where he is charge of the strategy and development of Latin American Innovation Funds focused on Venture Capital and Growth Capital. He later became Director of Innovation Funds at Telefónica SA; managing director of Telefónica Europe Chairman's & CEO Office; and managing director of Global Affairs and New Ventures. He also joined ESADE Business School as a Professor of Economics and Vice President of the ESADE Centre on Global Economy and Geopolitics (ESADEgeo). He is also the chair and Founder of the OECD Emerging Markets Network (EmNet), a platform of 50 leading multinationals from OECD and emerging countries (Brazil, India, Russia, China, South Africa) that he created while at the OECD and a member of the Advisory Council of Aspen Institute France.

=== Publisher ===
There he published the African Economic Outlook (AEO), conceived and launched new core products the Latin American Economic Outlook (LEO), the South East Asian Economic Outlook (SAEO) and the Global Development Outlook (GDO) on the Shifting Wealth of Nations. The OECD Development Centre experienced a profound transformation under Javier Santiso leadership, with nearly a tripling of the staff and a doubling of the Governing Board members, with most of the key emerging now full participants (Brazil, India, South Africa, Indonesia, VietNam, Egypt, Colombia, Chile, Turkey, Mexico, Poland, etc.).

Santiso is the author of over 70 articles on emerging markets, venture capital and startups. His most recent published books are: Latin America's Political Economy of the Possible: Beyond Good Revolutionaries and Free Marketeers, Cambridge, Massachusetts, MIT Press, 2007; The Oxford Handbook of Latin American Political Economy, Oxford and New York, Oxford University Press, 2012; The Decade of the Multilatinas, Cambridge, Cambridge University Press, 2013. He publishes regular Opinion Editorials in El País (Spain), Valor Económico (Brazil), and América Economía (Latin America).

He publishes also novels, in 2023 with Gallimard in Paris (Un pas de Deux, around the life of the American painter Edward Hopper. He writes in both French and Spanish. Before in 2021 with La Huerta Grande, in Madrid he published also other novels (Vivir con el corazón; El sabor a sangre no se me quite de la voz). He founded the art & poetry publishing house La Cama Sol www.lacamasol.com that works with writers and poets like Christian Bobin, Pascal Quignard, Tahar Ben Jelloun, Joan Margarit or Pere Gimferrer, and also painters and artists like Lita Cabellut, Etel Adnan, Paula Rego, Soledad Sevilla, Anselm Kiefer, Rachid Koraïchi, Juan Uslé, Rafael Canogar, Miquel Barceló, José Maria Cano, or Jaume Plensa.

== Books ==
- España 3.0., Planeta, 2015.
- Banking on Democracy: Financial Markets and Elections in Emerging Economies, Cambridge, Massachusetts, MIT Press, 2013.
- The Decade of the Multilatinas, Cambridge and New York, Cambridge University Press, 2013.
- The Oxford Handbook of Latin American Political Economy (Co-Ed.), Oxford and New York, 2012.
- La Década de las Multilatinas, Madrid, Siglo XXI, 2011.
- The Visible Hand of China in Latin America (Ed.), Paris, OECD Development Centre, 2007.
- Latin America's Political Economy of the Possible: Beyond good revolutionaries and free marketeers, Cambridge, Massachusetts, MIT Press, 2007.
- Amérique latine. Révolutionnaire, libérale, pragmatique, Paris, Autrement, 2005.
- The political economy of emerging markets: actors, institutions and crisis in Latin America, New York / London, Palgrave, 2003.
- Les puissances émergentes d'Amérique latine. Argentine, Brésil, Chili, Mexique, Paris, Armand Colin, 1999 (with Alain Musset, Hervé Théry and Sébastien Velut).
- Tiempo y democracia, Caracas, Nueva Sociedad, 1999 (co-edited with Andreas Schedler).
- El octavo día, Madrid, La Cama Sol, 20017.
- Antes de que venga la noche, Madrid, La Cama Sol, 2018.
- Donde ella estaba, estaba el paraíso, Madrid, Reino de Cordelia, 2019.
- Un sol de pulpa oscura, Madrid, Franz Ediciones, 2020.
- Vivir con el corazón, Madrid, La Huerta Grande, 2021.
- El sabor a sangre no se me quita de la voz, Madrid, La Huerta Grande, 2022.
- El cuento de las risas perdidas, Madrid, La Huerta Grande, 2023.
- Un pas de deux, Paris, Gallimard, 2023.
- El hotel, Madrid, La Cama Sol, 2023.
