= Juliette de La Genière =

French classical archaeologist (1927–2022)

- Born: 4 August 1927; Mulhouse, France
- Died: 6 June 2022 (aged 94); Neuilly-sur-Seine, France
- Occupation: Archaeologist
- Spouse: Renaud de La Genière

Academic background
- Education: Sciences Po; École du Louvre

Academic work
- Discipline: Archaeology
- Sub-discipline: Hellenistic archaeology
- Institutions: University of Lille

Juliette de La Genière (née Massenet; 4 August 1927 – 6 June 2022) was a French archaeologist. She worked at the University of Lille, where she founded the archaeology research centre, and the Scuola Normale Superiore di Pisa.

== Biography ==
De La Genière was born in Mulhouse, Haut-Rhin. After studying law (1946) and political science (graduating from Sciences Po in 1949), she obtained a diploma from the École du Louvre in 1954. She became a research fellow at the CNRS, a project manager at the Louvre, and received her PhD in classical archaeology in 1968.

From 1969 to 1996, she was Maître de conférences, and then professor, at the University of Lille, where she founded the archaeology research centre; she has been professor emerita since 1997. De La Genière was associate professor at the Scuola Normale Superiore di Pisa from 1983 to 1985 and visiting professor at University of Trento between 1988 and 1989.

Specialising in Hellenistic archaeology, between 1988 and 1997 she directed excavations at the sanctuary of Apollo at Claros and the sanctuary of Hera in Paestum. She has also conducted research on the Iron Age in southern Italy, directing excavations at sites in Sala Consilina, Amendolara, and Francavilla Marittima, some of which she has published as part of her PhD thesis with support from the École française de Rome and the Centre Jean Bérard.

On 27 October 2000, she was elected to the Académie des inscriptions et belles-lettres, succeeding Paul Ourliac, after having been a correspondent of the Académie for seven years. She is a member of the Istituto Nazionale di Studi Etruschi ed Italici, the Centre Jean Bérard, the Österreichisches Archäologisches Institut, the German Archaeological Institute, the Istituto siciliano per la Storia antica de Palerme, the Institut de la Grande Grèce, de la Commission du Corpus vasorum antiquorum and correspondent of the Archaeological Institute of America.

== Awards ==
- Officier of the National Order of the Legion of Honour (2005); Commandeur (2016)
- Commandeur of the National Order of Merit
- Commandeur of the Ordre des Palmes académiques
- Chevalier of the Order of the Arts and Letters
- Grand-Officer of the Order of Merit of the Italian Republic

== Bibliography ==
- Coudart, Annick (1998), "Archaeology of French Women and French Women in Archaeology", in Díaz-Andreu, Margarita; Stig Sørensen, Marie Louise (eds.), Excavating Women. A history of women in European archaeology, London: Routledge, ISBN 978-0415157605
