= Maurice Vaïsse =

French historian

Maurice Vaïsse (born 7 May 1942 in Algiers) is a French historian specialised in international relations, French foreign policy and military history.

== Biography ==
Vaïsse graduated with an agrégation in history in 1967 and a PhD in contemporary history (thèse d'État) in 1980, under the supervision of distinguished historian Jean-Baptiste Duroselle. From 1981 to 1995, he was a professor of contemporary history at the University of Reims, where he headed the Association pour la recherche sur la paix et la guerre (Arpege). From 2001 to 2014, he was a professor at the Institut d'études politiques de Paris (Sciences Po), teaching the history of international relations before retiring as professor emeritus.

Beyond his university teaching, Vaïsse has held several prominent research and institutional roles. From 1985 to 1986, he was an auditor at the Institut des hautes études de la défense nationale (IHEDN). He led the Groupe d'études français d'histoire de l'armement nucléaire (French study group for the history of nuclear weapons) from 1986 to 2000.

In 1994, he created the Centre d'études d'histoire de la défense (Centre for Defence History Studies), serving as its president until 2001. Later, from 2008 to 2016, he headed the scientific council for historical research at the French Ministry of Defence.

In the field of diplomatic history, Vaïsse served as a member of the Commission of Diplomatic Archives from 1992 to 2024. He also headed the Commission de publication des documents diplomatiques français for the 1960s period, tasked with publishing diplomatic cables and memos, and edited 30 volumes of French diplomatic documents covering the 1960s and early 1970s. Additionally, he was a member and chairman of the scientific council of the Charles de Gaulle Foundation between 1995 and 2001.

Vaïsse has sat on numerous editorial boards and peer committees, notably for Relations Internationales, Politique étrangère, Défense nationale, Cold War History Review, and the Retour aux textes collection of La Documentation française. Since 1991, he has co-directed the Revue d'histoire diplomatique. He also sits on the administrative council of the Liberté pour l'histoire association.

Vaïsse is the father of historian Justin Vaïsse.

== Honours ==
- Prize of the Institut de France for Sécurité d'abord, 1981
- Prize of the Académie des Sciences Morales et Politiques for Diplomatie et outil militaire, 1992
- Knight of the Legion of Honour (1994)
- Officer of the Ordre national du Mérite (2000)
- Doctor honoris causa from Oradea University (Romania, 2002)
- Grand Prix d'histoire de l'Académie française (2022)
- Grand Prix d'histoire de l'Académie des Sciences Morales et Politiques (2024)

== Works ==
=== Foreign policy manuals ===
- Diplomatie et outil militaire (1871–1991), Éditions du Seuil, Paris, 1992
- Les Relations internationales depuis 1945, Armand Colin, Paris, 19^{e} édition, 2025

=== Other works ===
- Sécurité d’abord. La politique française en matière de désarmement (9 décembre 1930 – 17 avril 1934), Pédone, Paris, 1981
- Alger, le putsch (1961), Complexe, Bruxelles, 1983
- Ardenne 1940, Veyrier, Paris, 1991
- L’Europe et la Crise de Cuba, Armand Colin, Paris, 1993
- Le Pacifisme en Europe des années 1920 aux années 1950, Bruylant, Bruxelles, 1993
- La France et l’Atome. Études d’histoire nucléaire, Bruylant, Bruxelles, 1994
- La Politique spatiale de la France dans le contexte international, Édition des Archives contemporaines, Paris, 1997
- La France et l’Opération de Suez de 1956. Actes d’une table ronde, ADDIM, Paris, 1997
- Aux armes citoyens ! Conscription et armée de métier, des Grecs à nos jours, Armand Colin, Paris, 1998
- « Il n’est point de secrets que le temps ne révèle. » Études sur l’histoire du renseignement, Lavauzelle, Panazol, 1998
- La Grandeur. Politique étrangère du général de Gaulle (1958–1969), Fayard, Paris, 1998
- Vers la paix en Algérie. Les négociations d’Évian dans les archives diplomatiques françaises, Bruylant, Bruxelles, 2003
- La Paix au XXe siècle, Paris, Belin, 2004
- La Puissance ou l'Influence ?, Paris, Fayard, 2009

=== Other works, as co-author ===
- Lexique historique des États-Unis au XXe siècle, avec Denise Artaud, Paris, Armand Colin, 1978
- La Champagne et ses administrations à travers le temps, La Manufacture, Paris, 1990
- L’Énergie nucléaire en Europe des origines à Euratom. Actes des journées d’études de Louvain-la-Neuve des 18 et 19 November 1991, Lang, Berne, 1994
- Diplomatie et outil militaire (1871–1991), avec Jean Doise, Éditions du Seuil, Paris, 1992
- 8 mai 1945 : la victoire en Europe. Actes du colloque international de Reims, 1985, Complexe, Bruxelles, 1994
- Dictionnaire des relations internationales au XXe siècle, avec Colette Barbier, Armand Colin, Paris, 2000
- Militaires et guérilla dans la guerre d’Algérie, avec Jean-Charles Jauffret, Complexe, Bruxelles, 2001
- Armement et V^{e} République (fin des années 1950 – fin des années 1960), Centre national de la recherche scientifique, Paris, 2002
- La Guerre au XXe siècle, avec Jean-Louis Dufour, Hachette, Paris, 2^{e} édition, 2003
- La Guerre du Viet-Nam et l’Europe (1963–1973), avec Christopher Goscha, Bruylant, Paris, 2003
- L’Europe et la Crise de Cuba (colloque), avec Charles Cogan, Armand Colin, Paris, 2003
- L’Entente cordiale de Fachoda à la Grande Guerre. Dans les archives du Quai d’Orsay, Complexe, Bruxelles, 2004
- Histoire de la diplomatie française, avec Jean-Claude Allain, Françoise Autrand, Lucien Bély, Philippe Contamine, Pierre Guillen, Thierry Lentz, Georges-Henri Soutou, Laurent Theis, 2005
- Dictionnaire des ministres des Affaires étrangères, co-direction avec Lucien Bély, Laurent Theis, Georges-Henri Soutou, préface de Michel Barnier, Fayard, Paris, 2005
- De Gaulle et la Russie, avec Philippe Oulmont et Létizia de Linarès, Centre national de la recherche scientifique, Paris, 2006
- Mai 68 vu de l'étranger : les événements dans les archives diplomatiques françaises, avec Colette Barbier, Victor Cassé, Thérèse Charmasson, Editions CNRS, Paris, 2008
