= Enzo Carli (photographer) =

Italian sociologist (born 1949)

Enzo Carli (born 13 July 1949) is an Italian sociologist, journalist, photographer and historian of photography. He was born in Senigallia.

== Biography ==
Photographer, sociologist, journalist and scholar of photography, a student of Mario Giacomelli, he graduated with a thesis on Mario Giacomelli in the context of contemporary Italian photography.

From 1980 through 1990, he participated in debates and conferences on photography, attended and curated photographic exhibitions throughout Italy. In 1995 he coordinated the theoretical framework of the Manifesto and the exhibition of the Centro Studi Marche then Manifesto Photographers: “Passaggio di Frontiera,” signed by Mario Giacomelli, Gianni Berengo Gardin, Giorgio Cutini, Ferruccio Ferroni, Luigi Erba, Aristide Salvalai, Francesco Sartini, Paolo Mengucci, Sofio Valenti with Marco Melchiorri and Loriano Brunetti as witnesses. In 1996 he was listed as a scholar of Mario Giacomelli in the Utet Encyclopedia, Cultural Updates.

In 2002-4 he was Artistic Director of the European project “Human Work” photographic survey on work involving Italy (Province of Ancona) as leader, with Spain, Germany and Romania. In 2005 he participated for the National Library of France in the exhibition “Metamorphosis” on Mario Giacomelli with Jean-Claude Lemagny and Anne Biroleau. In 2009 he presented the solo exhibition, photographic project Archaeology of Feelings at Ikona Gallery in Venice, under the artistic direction of Živa Kraus, and in the same year curated by Michel Dubois, with the presentation of Jean Claude Lemagny, proposed in Paris (Saint-Nom-La-Breteche).

In 2010, with the Circolo degli Artisti of Reggio Emilia, and Fenalc as part of Fotografia Europea, at the Aula Magna of the Università degli Studi Di Modena e Reggio Emilia. A selection was exhibited in Berlin-Kopenick. In September 2011, the solo exhibition was offered in Sicily at the Ghirri Gallery-Museo della Fotografia in Caltagirone, where it is currently stored. The exhibition was presented for the first time in the Marche region in Fabriano on the occasion of the 2012 Gentile da Fabriano Prize. In 2013, the University of Camerino dedicated a solo exhibition to him with a presentation by Rector Corradini and in 2017 with Archeologia dei sentimenti - Crisalidi in Jesi at Palazzo Bisaccioni with a presentation by Armando Ginesi.

Former Vice President of the Italian Society of Sociology, master's degree in clinical sociology, in 1990 he was appointed free lecturer at the Higher Institute of Cybernetics of the Republic of San Marino and in 2010/11 he has a position as lecturer of sociology and culture of photography at the Faculty of Architecture of the University of Camerino, in 2011/13 as lecturer of photography at the University “Carlo Bo” of Urbino, sociology of Communication.

To his credit numerous publications on criticism and history of photography both on a specialized level and divulge publishing with various Publishing Houses (Alinari, Fabbri, Charta, Adriatica Editrice, Gribaudo, Il Lavoro Editoriale, Ideas edizioni, Quattro Venti, etc.).

== Selected works ==
- Il reale immaginario, Ed. Il lavoro Editoriale, Ancona;
- E se cent'anni vi sembran pochi, Ed. Il lavoro Editoriale, Ancona;
- Fotografia, Adriatica Edizioni, Ancona
- Spazi Interiori, Adriatica Edizioni,
- Guida alla fotografia, Fabbri edizioni, Milano:
- Mario Giacomelli. La forma dentro, Charta Edizioni Ancona;
- Human Work, Provincia di Ancona, UE;
- Archeologia dei sentimenti, Ideas Edizioni Benevento,
- Crisalidi, Ed. Quattro Venti, Urbino;
- Quella porta sullo sguardo, Ideas Edizioni Benevento;
- Moto contrario, Ed. Alinari;
- Mi ricordo che, Ed. Alinari;
- Il dagherrotipo mutante, Ideas Edizioni Benevento.
