= Olivier Auroy =

French writer and entrepreneur

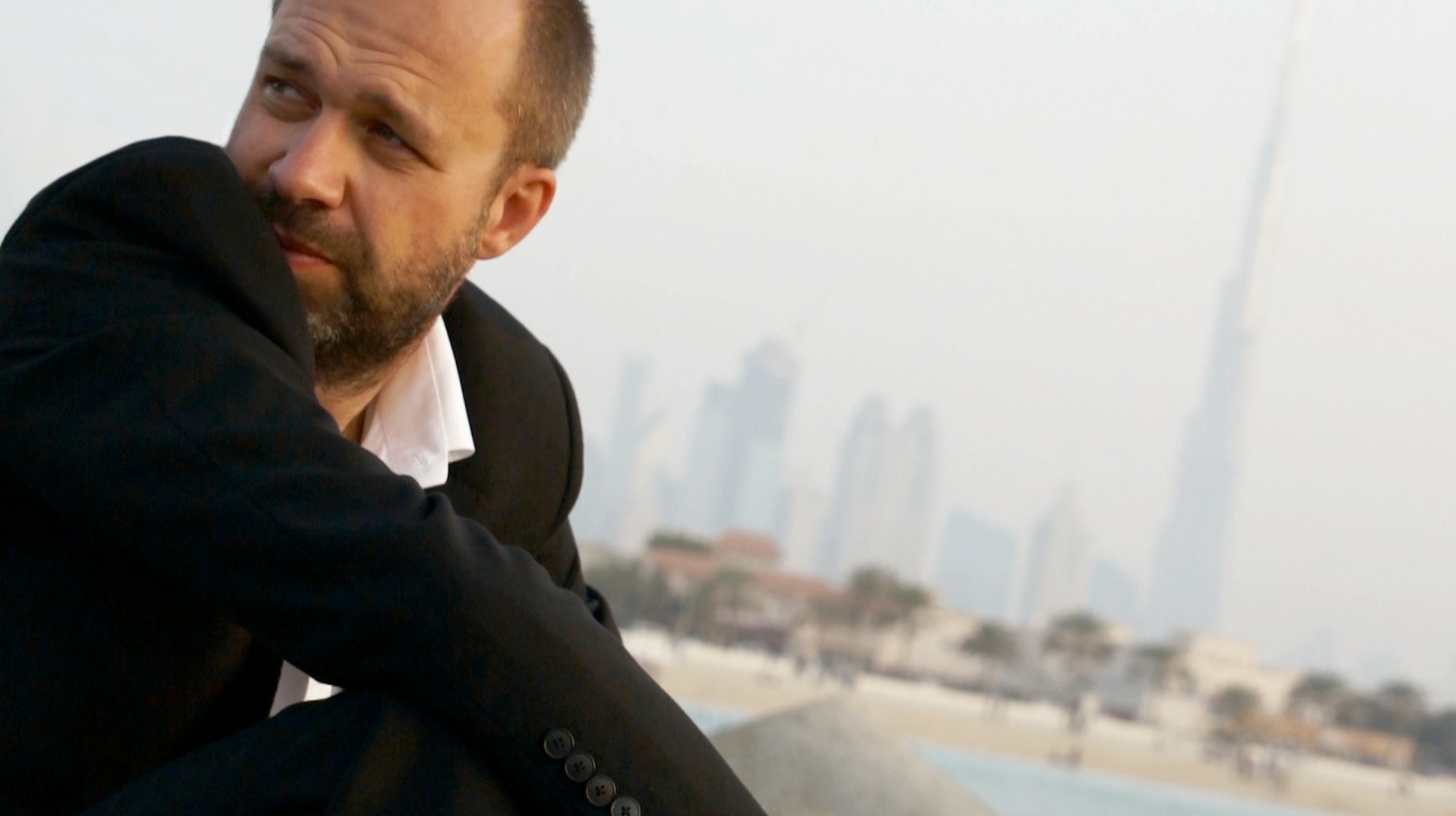
- Olivier Auroy
- Born: 25 April 1969 (age 57); Orléans, France
- Other name: Gabriel Malika
- Education: Paris Institute of Political Studies, CELSA Paris
- Occupations: author, entrepreneur

Olivier Auroy (born 25 April 1969 in Orléans, France) is a French writer and entrepreneur. Some of his works are published under the pen name Gabriel Malika.

== Biography ==
Olivier Auroy is a graduate from Science-Po Paris, class of 1991. He holds a master degree in advertising and marketing from CELSA (Paris, La Sorbonne).

He worked as product manager for Renault Italia until 1995 before moving on to a variety of naming, branding and design agencies. He is appointed Managing Director of Landor Dubai in 2006 and becomes CEO of FITCH Middle East (WPP) in 2009. Around that time, he launches BQ, a brand of sunglasses inspired by the Emirati burka.

In 2014, after having spent the better part of a decade in the Middle East, he is recruited by the French agency CBA as head of Corporate Branding. He was Joint Managing Director of Kantar Consulting till 2018. In 2019, he creates Onomaturge, a company dedicated to brand creation.

His views are regularly reported in the press, especially in The Huffington Post and Marketing Society.

== Writing career ==
While in the Middle East, he publishes his first two novels under the pen name Gabriel Malika, so as to separate his identity as writer and as a businessman.

His first book, Les Meilleures intentions du monde (The Best Intentions in the World), published in 2011, tells the stories of men and women from all walks of life embarked on a journey off the coast of Dubai. This the first ever French novel to use Dubai as backdrop for its intrigue, which has been called a "literary milestone" in and of itself. In December 2017 this book was edited in an English digital version.

The second book, Qatarina, is published in 2014. In 2022, US teacher John Summerbe flies to Quarabia, where the Football World Cup is being held. With this work of fiction, Oliver Auroy openly criticizes Qatar's bid to host the 2022 FIFA World Cup.

His third novel, Au nom d’Alexandre (In the name of Alexander), is published under his real name in 2016. Alexandre works in brand naming. He opens up to a young journalist and reflects on his professional life. Inspired by his own career, Oliver Auroy "presents us with a delightful novel about an excentric scholar".

His fourth novel, L'amour propre is published in April 2018 by « éditions Intervalles ».

== Other activities ==
Between 2012 and 2014 Auroy hosted debates and interviews with other writers including Jérôme Ferrari, Maxime Chattam, Dominique de Saint-Mars and Katherine Pancol during Dubai Literary Festival. He is often featured on the RTL radio talk show La Curiosité est un vilain défaut. He was a frequent panelist on Talking of Books, a Dubai Eye radio program. While in Dubai, he also worked as literary critique for Le Mag du Moyen-Orient magazine.

== Personal life ==
Olivier Auroy is married to an Italian native. Together, they have two daughters.

== Works ==
- (in French) Jean-Marie Albertini et Olivier Auroy, L'aventure de l'automobile. Gallimard. 1995. ISBN 978-2070587452.
- (in French) Gabriel Malika, Les meilleures intentions du monde. Editions Intervalles. 2011. ISBN 978-2916355597.
  - (in English) Gabriel Malika, The Best Intentions in the World. Editions Intervalles. 2017. ASIN B077Y3D284.
- (in French) Gabriel Malika, Qatarina. Editions Intervalles. 2014. ISBN 978-2916355986.
- (in French) Olivier Auroy, Au nom d'Alexandre. Editions Intervalles. 2016. ISBN 978-2369560319.
- (in French) Olivier Auroy, L'amour propre. Editions Intervalles. 2018. ISBN 978-2-36956-063-0.
- (in French) Olivier Auroy, Dicorona. Editions Intervalles. 2020. ISBN 978-2-36956-094-4.
- (in French) Olivier Auroy, Les déraisonnables. Anne Carrière. 2021. ISBN 978-2380821352.
