= Elise Buckle =

French environmental policy expert and lecturer

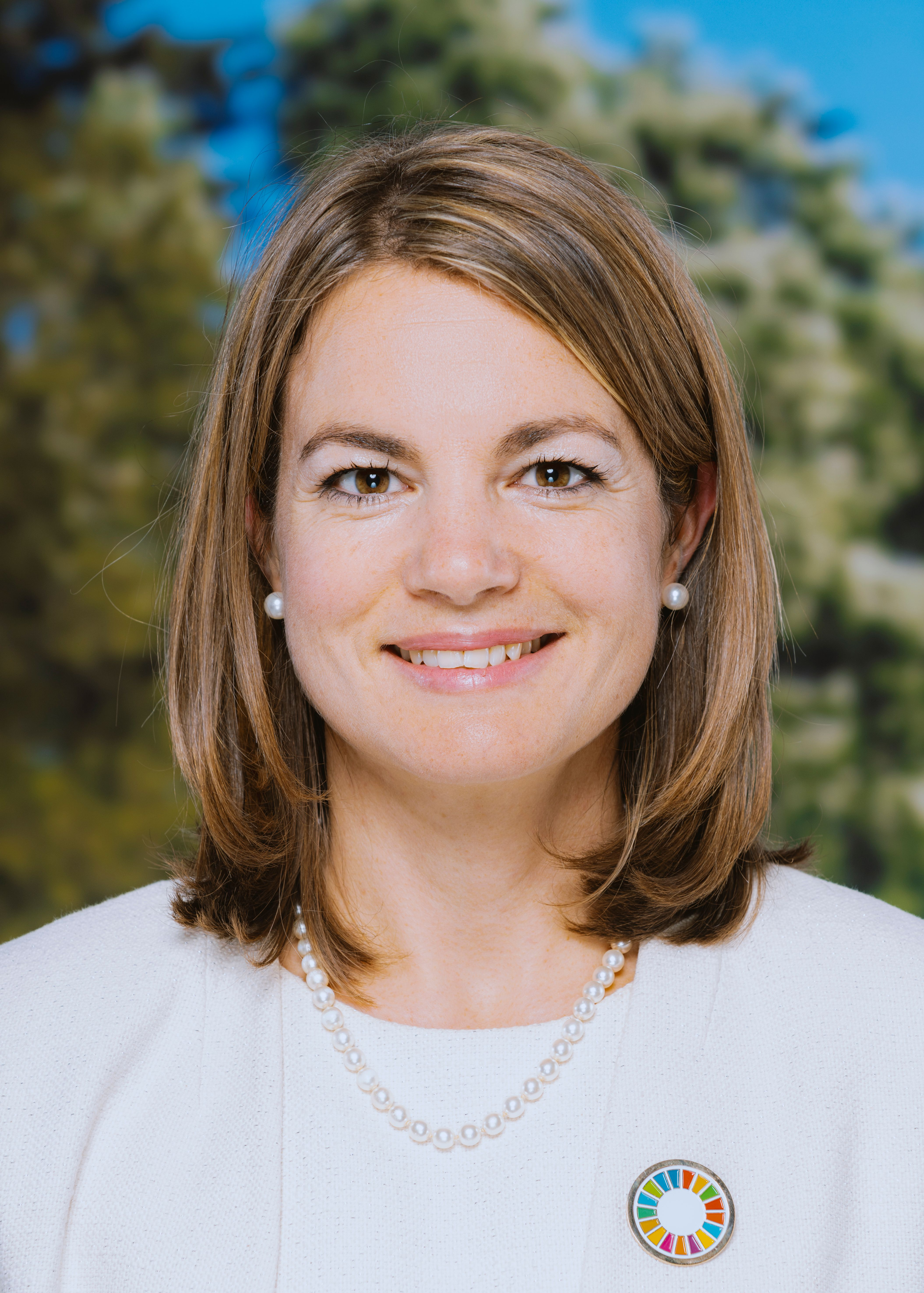
- Born: Elise Breyton Buckle
- Education: Sciences Po; London School of Economics
- Occupations: Climate leader, professor
- Employer: Glion Institute of Higher Education
- Website: climatebridges.org

Elise Breyton Buckle is a Franco-Swiss climate leader, professor and environmental expert. She is President and CEO of Climate Bridges. She is one of the initial Co-founders of SHE Changes Climate and founder of SHE Builds Bridges. She is a professor at the Graduate Institute of International and Development Studies for the Executive Programme Graduate Institute of Geneva and also teaches Sustainability, Innovation and Entrepreneurship at the Glion Institute of Business Education. She was elected as Executive member in the municipal government of Nyon, Switzerland. She has been advising various organizations at the United Nations on climate change, nature-based solutions and leadership training for peace and climate diplomacy. She is also a published author and writer. She has been nominated as International Gender Champion and co-lead of the climate impact group.

== Education ==
Buckle holds a master's degree of International Relations and Development from the Institute of Political Science - Sciences Po Paris and Master of Science in Environmental Policy Planning and Regulation from the London School of Economics. She also holds a Post-Graduate Certificate in Education, International from the University of Nottingham. In 2023, Buckle completed a degree in Leadership for the 21st century from Harvard Kennedy School of Government.

== Career ==
Buckle advised Ambassador Khan as Chief Negotiator for the UNFCCC COP23 Fiji Presidency leading to the successful adoption of the COP23 Decision for the Talanoa Dialogue aimed at raising climate ambition. She was also senior advisor to David Nabarro appointed by the UN Secretary General Antonio Guterres as co-facilitator of the Nature-Based Solutions coalition.

Buckle coordinated the Planetary Emergency Partnership. She advised scientist and professor Johan Rockström with a focus on planetary boundaries as well as economist Sandrine Dixson-Declèveon a paradigm shift "Beyond GDP growth". She also worked with Dixson-Declève as a senior advisor on Resilience for the UN Food Systems Summit in 2021.

Buckle is part of the Jury of the Financial Times which selected the best climate essay on women empowerment in 2022. At UNFCCC Climate COP26, she hosted the city day on nature. For UNFCCC COP27, she became officially accredited by the UN as head of delegation. She led the SHE Changes Climate and delivered an official statement to the COP27 Presidency on gender day. In 2023, she organized and hosted an online Summit[MOU1] with SHE Changes Climate and Project Dandelion, during which Sultan Al Jaber, President of COP28 and Mary Robinson, former President of Ireland and Chair of the Elders, had a dialogue on climate science, the energy transition and the need to phase out fossil fuels. She also hosted and facilitated a high-level dialogue at COP28 in Dubai on 8 December 2023 with a number of Ambassadors and diplomats[MOU4]. In 2024, following a press statement covered in the Guardian, she convinced the COP29 Presidency to include more women on its organizing committee[MOU6]. On 14 February 2024[MOU7], she was appointed as co-chair of the International Gender Champions climate impact group, together with the Ambassador Katharina Stasch Germany, Ambassador Guillermet, Costa Rica and the Secretary General of IFRC, Jagan Chapagain. In March 2024, she was also recognized as one of the 25 women aWomen for Change selection of the Change Now Summit in Paris[MOU8].

=== Political career ===
From 2018 to 2022, Buckle served as Member of the City Council for the Green Party and as Member of the Executive team for the City of Nyon, in charge of the energy transition and Human Resources. She also organized several participatory Citizens Forums on climate and sustainability at the local level.

== Selected publications ==
- Le Sommet de Copenhague: un séisme politique nécessaire, Editions Ecoles des Mines, Paris, Responsabilité et Environnement: Après Copenhague, Juin 2009
- Fossil Fuel Subsidies Reform in 24 OECD countries, European Parliament, Brussels, May 2012
- Le Voyage de Lucien et Léa, Editions Jets d'Encre, Paris, July 2015 Voyage de Lucien et Léa
- Climate Change and Labour: impacts of heat in the workforce, UNDP report, April 2016 UNDP report on Heat
- Lola, l'Arbre de la Féminité, Editions Jets d'Encre Juin 2017 Lola, l'Arbre de la Féminitié
- Emerging From Emergency Publication
