= Justin Vaïsse =

French international relations scholar

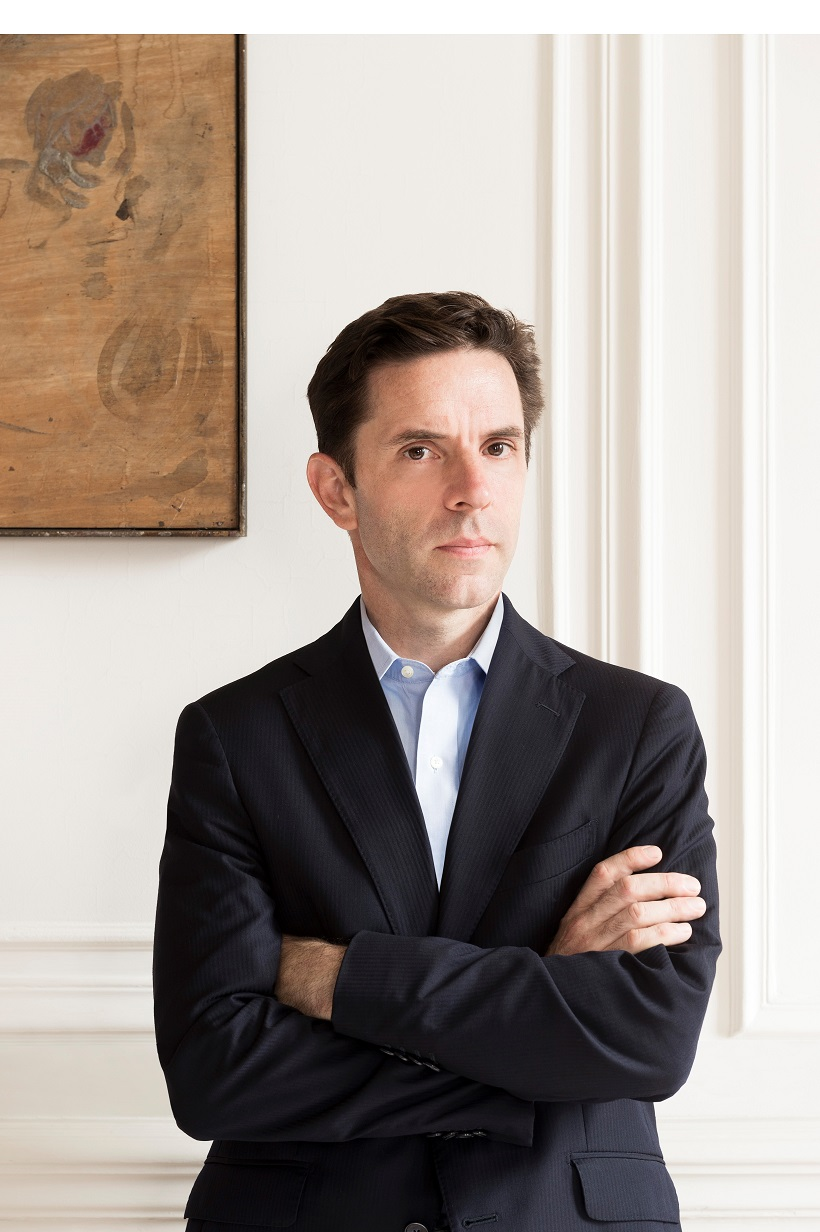
- Vaïsse in 2016

Personal details
- Born: Justin Pierre Albert Vaïsse; 26 June 1973 (age 53) Reims, Marne, France
- Parent(s): Maurice Vaïsse, France de Boissonneaux de Chevigny

Justin Pierre Albert Vaïsse (born 26 June 1973) is a French historian and intellectual. Since July 2026, he is James Anderson Professor of American Foreign Policy at Johns Hopkins University, teaching at the School of Advanced International Studies on the Bologna campus of SAIS Europe, as well as a Senior Fellow at the Henry A. Kissinger Center for Global Affairs affiliated with SAIS. Since January 2026, he is also President of the Paris Peace Forum Endowment Fund, established to support the Paris Peace Forum, an NGO he created in 2018 (first as President, then as Director general from March 2019 to June 2026) with support from President Emmanuel Macron. The Paris Peace Forum is a major annual gathering and a policy organization that promotes international cooperation and better global governance, especially through coalitions of actors. Prior to this role, Justin Vaïsse was director of policy planning at the French Ministry of Foreign Affairs from 2013 to 2019.

== Education ==
A graduate student from École normale supérieure de Saint-Cloud and Sciences Po, Vaïsse earned his PhD in history in 2005 and his habilitation à diriger des recherches in 2011.

== Career ==
Vaïsse was a teaching assistant at Harvard University in 1996–1997, and an adjunct professor at Sciences Po from 1999 to 2007 and at the School of Advances International Studies (SAIS, Paul H. Nitze School of Advances International Studies, Washington) at Johns Hopkins University from 2007 to 2013.

His areas of expertise include American foreign policy, transatlantic and French-American relations, and Islam in France. Vaïsse is the author or co-author of numerous books on the United States, including Neoconservatism – The Biograph of a Movement, (Harvard University Press, 2010), a book deemed “essential reading for anyone wishing to understand the contours of our recent political past” by the New York Times.

In 2006, he co-authored Integrating Islam: Political and Religious Challenges in Contemporary France (Brookings Press) with Professor Jonathan Laurence, a book named “2007 Outstanding Academic Title” by the American Library Association and subsequently translated into French.

From 2007 to 2013, Vaïsse was director of research for the Center on the United States and Europe and a senior fellow in foreign policy at the Brookings Institution, where he initiated several projects, including the Brookings Eurozone Survey and the European Foreign Policy Scorecard with the European Council on Foreign Relations (ECFR) – an annual evaluation of Europe's performance on the world stage.

In March 2013, Vaïsse was chosen by Laurent Fabius, the French minister of foreign affairs, to helm the ministry's Policy Planning center (Centre d'analyse, de prévision et de stratégie, CAPS). The CAPS in an internal think tank, similar to the American Policy Planning Staff in that it provides independent policy analysis and strategic advice, with a specific focus on anticipation. As director of policy planning, Vaïsse became an expert on all major foreign policy topics, advised the minister on his strategic decisions, provided background analysis and forecasts on international affairs, managed a network of policy planners, and supervised a team of high-level strategic analysts.

His biography of former national security adviser Zbigniew Brzezinksi was published in France in 2016 and in the US in 2018 under the title Zbigniew Brzezinski – America's Grand Strategist (Harvard University Press) to critical acclaim, with translations in Chinese and Polish.

In 2017, President Emmanuel Macron tasked Vaïsse with outlining the contours of an annual event that would respond to the growing woes of multilateralism by convening all actors of global governance once a year around major initiatives and concrete projects. The Paris Peace Forum was born the following year and its first edition coincided with the centenary of the armistice of World War I on 11 November 2018. It convened 65 Heads of State and government, 10 heads of international organization, and about 6,000 participants from civil society NGOs, the corporate world, trade unions, foundations, and think tanks.

The organization was founded as an independent NGO (association under French loi 1901) by six organizations (Sciences Po, Institut français des relations internationales (Ifri), Institut Montaigne, French Ministry of Foreign Affairs, Körber Foundation, Mo Ibrahim Foundation) and Justin Vaïsse was its first president. In early 2019, Pascal Lamy took over as president and Justin Vaïsse became director general.

== Other activities ==
- European Council on Foreign Relations (ECFR), Member

== Personal life ==
His father is prominent historian Maurice Vaïsse.

== Career overview ==
- 2007 – 2013: Senior Fellow, Foreign Policy Studies, and Director of Research, Center on the US and Europe, Brookings Institution
- 2013 – 2019: Director of the Policy Planning staff of the French Ministry of Foreign Affairs
- 2018 – 2026: President then Director General of the Paris Peace Forum
- 2026 – present: James Anderson Professor of American Foreign Policy at SAIS Europe, Johns Hopkins University

== Main published works ==
As author or co-author – in English

- Zbigniew Brzezinksi – America's Grand Strategist (translated by Catherine Porter), Harvard University Press, 2018
- Neoconservatism: The Biography of a Movement (translated by Arthur Goldhammer), Cambridge (MA), The Belknap Press of Harvard University Press, 2010, 376 p.
- La présidence impériale : de Franklin D. Roosevelt à George W. Bush, avec Denis Lacorne (dir.), Paris, Odile Jacob, 2007, 220 p.
- Integrating Islam: Political and Religious Challenges in Contemporary France, with Jonathan Laurence, Washington DC, The Brookings Institution Press, 2006, 342 p.
