= Yvette Lebas-Guyot =

French journalist and commander

- Born: Marthe Yvette Lebas; 22 February 1898; Le Mans (Sarthe), France
- Died: 14 May 1966 (aged 68); Paris, France
- Other names: Marthe Y. Lebas, Marthe Yvette Guyot, Marthe Yvette Lebas-Guyot
- Education: Sciences Po
- Occupations: Journalist; Commander
- Spouse: Raymond Guyot (1877-1934)
- Parents: Albert Isidore Lebas (father); Berthe Eugénie Marie Darnaud (mother)

Yvette Lebas-Guyot (1898-1966) was a lifelong French journalist and, during World War II, was a translator/interpreter and a commander in the Free French Forces.

== Biography ==
She was born Marthe Yvette Lebas, in Le Mans (Sarthe), France, on 22 February 1898. Her father was Albert Isidore Lebas (1853-1930), Brigadier General and military governor of Lille (North), and her mother was Berthe Eugénie Marie Darnaud.

Yvette studied at the Lycée du Mans in Lille and then attended the Lycée Molière in Paris. She went on to graduate from the prestigious Free School of Political Sciences (now called the Paris Institute of Political Studies and abbreviated as Sciences Po).

She married twice: the first time to Marius Fouque in 1917, but they divorced about ten years later. Her second marriage took place in February 1933 in Paris to Raymond Guyot (1877-1934), a professor of modern history at Sciences Po, a lecturer at the Carnegie Institute and editor-in-chief of Politica. He died the following year.

Lebas-Guyot began her career as a journalist during the years between world wars, working in France and overseas, with numerous study trips abroad or in the French colonies. She wrote under a variety of pen names including Marthe Y. Lebas, Marthe Yvette Guyot and Marthe Yvette Lebas-Guyot.

=== World War II efforts ===
Her activities during the war were significant in Austria and the United States. Fluent in English, Lebas-Guyot arrived in the United States in April 1941 and from September 1941 through October 1943, she provided press services and radio broadcasts for the France Forever organization.

In addition, Lebas-Guyot worked for the French section of Voice of America as an editor, where she created the daily radio program titled La France en Guerre (France at War). In 1943, Yvette Lebas joined the Free French Forces, led by General Charles de Gaulle, as an officer of the women's naval services. Under her command, she founded the French Female Fleet Forces in Algiers, Algeria.

=== Post war activities ===
After the war, beginning in June 1946, Lebas-Guyot worked as an interpreter-translator in France for the Secretariat of the General Staff Committee. Then in June 1948 she became an interpreter for the French Delegation to the United Nations in New York.

In 1964, she published a largely autobiographical work, Le Mariage de Moscou (The Moscow Marriage), under her maiden name Marthe Y. Lebas, in which she recalled meeting Jean Arens (1889-1937), a diplomat to the Soviet Union and her companion in Paris and Moscow.

Lebas-Guyot died at her home in Paris on 14 May 1966.

Her papers are kept at the French National Archive and labeled: Lebas-Guyot (Yvette) 435AP.
