= Luis López Álvarez =

Spanish poet

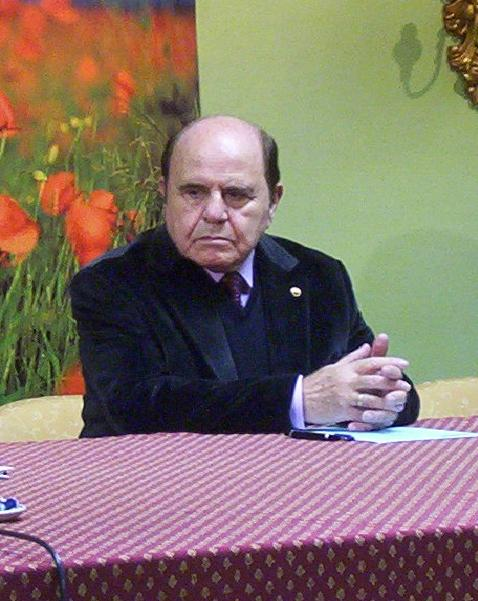
- López Álvarez, 2006
- Born: Luis López Álvarez; May 7, 1930 (age 96); León, Spain
- Citizenship: español
- Education: Sciences Po (BS) University of Paris (MA, PhD)
- Spouse: Judith Roig Navarro
- Children: Olga, Reinaldo y Ernesto López
- Writing career
- Genres: Poetry, novel, essay
- Notable work: Los comuneros
- Website: www.luislopezalvarez.com

Luis López Álvarez (born May 7, 1930) is a Spanish poet and former professor.

== Biography ==
As a teenager, Luis López Alvarez had Narciso Alonso Cortés (1875–1972) as a teacher.

He particularly belongs to the poets of the generation of the 50s. With his third book of poems, Las Querencias (1969) he presented a total of thirty-seven impeccable classical sonnets which he completed years later in the collection of 113 sonnets that make Querencias y quereres (2001). Meanwhile, with his romance Los Comuneros, he achieved great fame and recognition. He further innovated in his trilogy of poems Cárcava (1974), Tránsito (1979), and Pálpito (1990).

Luis López Álvarez received a bachelor's degree in Political Science (1957) from Sciences Po, in addition to a master's degree in Sociology of art (1970) and a PhD in Latin American Studies summa cum laude (1985) from the University of Paris III- Sorbonne. For thirteen years he worked in the service of the French radio and television broadcasting, first in Paris and later in Brazzaville (Republic of the Congo). His cultural commitment to the Congo led him to found and direct the Institute of Congolese Studies, a commitment which turned into political activism alongside Patrice Lumumba, future Prime Minister, who renewed many years later as an adviser of the first President of the Democratic Republic of Congo, Laurent Kabila.

Starting in 1968 he worked for UNESCO as an international functionary of the United Nations and held various positions in Paris, Havana, and Caracas: Service Chief of Radio and Television in the Spanish Language, Regional Adviser of Culture in Latin America and the Caribbean, Regional Director for the same region, Ombudsman in the Parisian headquarters and Coordinator, from Caracas, of the activities of the same organization in the region of Latin America and the Caribbean.

After his return to Spain in 1985, he settled in Segovia where he coordinated the International Programs at the Complutense University of Madrid. In 1993, he returned to Latin America. First as a professor at the Simon Bolivar University in Caracas, and since 1998 as a professor of literature in the Hispanic Studies departments at the Mayagüez and San Juan campuses of the University of Puerto Rico where he remained until 2013.

== List of works ==
=== Poetry ===
- Arribar Sosegado, 1952.
- Víspera en Europa, 1957.
- Las Querencias, 1969.
- Rumor de Praga, 1971.
- Los Comuneros, 1972.
- Cárcava, 1974.
- Tránsito, 1979.
- Cómputo (Poesía 1951–1982), 1979.
- Elegíaca, 1985.
- Pálpito, 1990.
- Adarmes, 1991.
- Querencias y quereres, 2001.
- El amor en tiempo de Acuario, 2002.
- Memorial de Trinidad, 2012.

=== Novels ===
- Cóncavo Congo, 2008.

=== Essays ===
- Salvador de Madariaga, el hombre, el europeo, el español, 1962.
- Lumumba ou l'Afrique frustrée, 1965.
- Neruda, muerte y testamento, 1974.
- Conversaciones con Miguel Ángel Asturias, 1974.
- Antología de Aimé Cesaire, 1979.
- Caracas, 1989.
- Literatura e identidad en Venezuela, 1991.
- En Europa con Madariaga, 2002.
