= Marc Drillech =

French sociologist

- Born: Drillich
- Citizenship: French
- Education: Lille University of Science and Technology (B.A. Institut d'Études Politiques de Paris (M.A.}
- Years active: 1980-2023
- Employer: IONIS Education Group
- Known for: Vice-President of IONIS Education Group
- Successor: Charline Avenel
- Website: www.leboycott.fr

Marc Drillech is a French sociologist and former President of a French private education group. He was vice-president of IONIS Education Group, in France a private higher education group, from 2005 till 2023.

== Biography ==
Graduating from Lille University of Science and Technology (Bachelor's degree in sociology) and from Institut d'Études Politiques de Paris (Master's degree), Marc Drillech started his career in 1980 as publicity manager at agence Feldman Calleux et Associés. After that, he became general manager of Mandarine. In 1990, he joined Publicis where he became vice-president of Publicis Group. In 2005, he moved to higher education by joining IONIS Education Group as vice-president. He retired in 2023, replaced by Charline Avenel.

== Bibliography ==
- Marc Drillech, Gérald Basseporte, Le boycott, le cauchemar des entreprises et des politiques, 1999, ISBN 2878454219
- Gad Drillich, L'adieu au calme : Juifs de France ou juifs en France, 2004, ISBN 2849280321
- Marc Drillech, Le Boycott. Histoire. Actualités. Perspectives, 2011, ISBN 2916571558
