= Paris Peace Forum =

French non-profit organization and annual forum

- Forum de Paris sur la Paix
- Formation: 9 March 2018; 8 years ago
- Legal status: Non-profit organization (Association Loi 1901)
- Headquarters: Paris, France
- Official language: French, English
- President: Philippe Etienne
- Director General: Franck Paris
- Key people: Pascal Lamy
- Website: parispeaceforum.org

The Paris Peace Forum (French: Forum de Paris sur la Paix) is a French non-profit organisation created in March 2018. The organisation hosts an annual gathering of world leaders and heads of international organisations, as well as leaders from civil society and private sectors and thousands of individuals from around the globe, on creating forms of collective action. The Paris Peace Forum completes the existing world agenda of multilateral gatherings by creating a specific event for global governance issues, as economic and financial issues are dealt at the World Economic Forum in Davos, and security issues at the Munich Security Conference.

The forum's purpose is to be inclusive and solution-oriented. With this in mind, the forum showcases projects each year, coming from all around the world, which display concrete and efficient solutions to governance challenges. Focused on concrete initiatives, the annual event has been used as a platform for the launch of important, multi-actor initiatives, such as the B4IG coalition or the Paris Call for Trust and Security in the Cyberspace.

In a world requiring more collective action, the Paris Peace Forum is a platform open to all seeking to develop coordination, rules, and capacities that answer global problems. Its three primary pillars of activity include year-round policy initiatives and project support activities coupled by an annual event in November:

1. Convening the world: Every year, the Paris Peace Forum convenes heads of state, leaders of international organizations and companies, and civil society organizations from around the world at its annual event to improve global governance.
2. Boosting projects: At its annual event and throughout the year, the Paris Peace Forum showcases and accelerates emerging solutions through customized support by connecting project leaders with decision-makers, practitioners, and funders. Since 2018, over 400 projects have been featured, of which 10 annually receive one year of customized support via the forum's Scale-up program.
3. Incubating initiatives: The Paris Peace Forum leverages its community of members and partners, as well as its privileged access to expertise and diplomatic networks, to launch and accelerate multi-actor initiatives providing responses to global challenges.

The Paris Peace Forum was founded in 2018 by Justin Vaïsse, as he was director for Policy Planning at the French Ministry for Europe and Foreign Affairs, to tackle global problems and strengthen multilateral cooperation. Soon after the first edition, Pascal Lamy was appointed President of the Paris Peace Forum, and Justin Vaïsse became its director general. The first edition was hosted in November 2018 at the Grande halle de la Villette.

The eighth and most recent edition of the Paris Peace Forum was held on 29-30 October at the Palais de Chaillot.

== History ==
The Paris Peace Forum was born out of the principle that "a badly governed world would quickly become a world at war", as explained by Justin Vaïsse, then president of the forum. At the Meeting of Ambassadors on 29 August 2017, French President Emmanuel Macron spoke of the fact that peace is not something to be taken for granted, mentioning the Syrian Civil War and the Russo-Ukrainian War as examples. In light of such developments, he called for the need to take concrete steps to strengthen multilateralism and preserve peace. Macron then announced the creation of the Paris Peace Forum on 4 January 2018.

== Philosophy ==
The purpose of the forum is to commemorate Armistice Day, as well as to "reflect together, propose concrete initiatives, reinvent multilateralism and all forms of contemporary cooperation". President Macron and then-president Justin Vaïsse aimed at bringing together global governance actors, in an international and open space, in order to interact, discuss and generate concrete solutions. An important aspect of the forum is the showcasing of projects from around the world. Each of these projects proposes an innovative solution to a specific issue.

During the forum, ten projects are selected as Scale-up projects to receive mentorship and support from the Paris Peace Forum for a one-year period.

Although initiated by the French President, the forum remains independent in its scope and funding. The event is financed by non-governmental partners, each of which cannot cover more than 10% of the costs.

== Organisation ==
The Paris Peace Forum is made up of three distinct governance bodies:

- The Executive Committee oversees and decides on the overall activities of the forum. The Executive Committee is composed of representatives from members, as well as persons elected by the General Assembly among the members of the Association: the French Ministry of Europe and Foreign Affairs, the European Commission, México Evalúa, the Mo Ibrahim Foundation, Research and Information System for Developing Countries (RIS), Microsoft, the Foreign Policy Community of Indonesia (FPCI), Open Society Foundations (OSF), and the Aga Khan Development Network (AKDN). José Ángel Gurría, former Secretary-General of the OECD, leads the executive committee as president of the Paris Peace Forum.
- The General Assembly is composed of representatives from: the French Ministry of Europe and Foreign Affairs, the Spanish Ministry of Foreign Affairs, the German Ministry of Foreign Affairs, México Evalúa, the Mo Ibrahim Foundation, Research and Information System for Developing Countries (RIS), Sciences Po, Microsoft, the Embassy of Kenya in France, the Foreign Policy Community of Indonesia (FPCI), Open Society Foundations (OSF), Mohammed VI Polytechnic University and the Aga Khan Development Network (AKDN).
- The Steering Committee determines the strategy of the forum, and is made up of international experts with specialization in various aspects of global governance, with balanced gender and geographical representation.

The activities of the forum are also carried out by the Permanent Secretariat, based in Paris, carries out all operations related to the execution of the event. It is led by Justin Vaïsse as Director-General, Fabienne Hara as Deputy Director-General and Karine Roche as Secretary-General.

== Editions ==
=== First edition (2018) ===
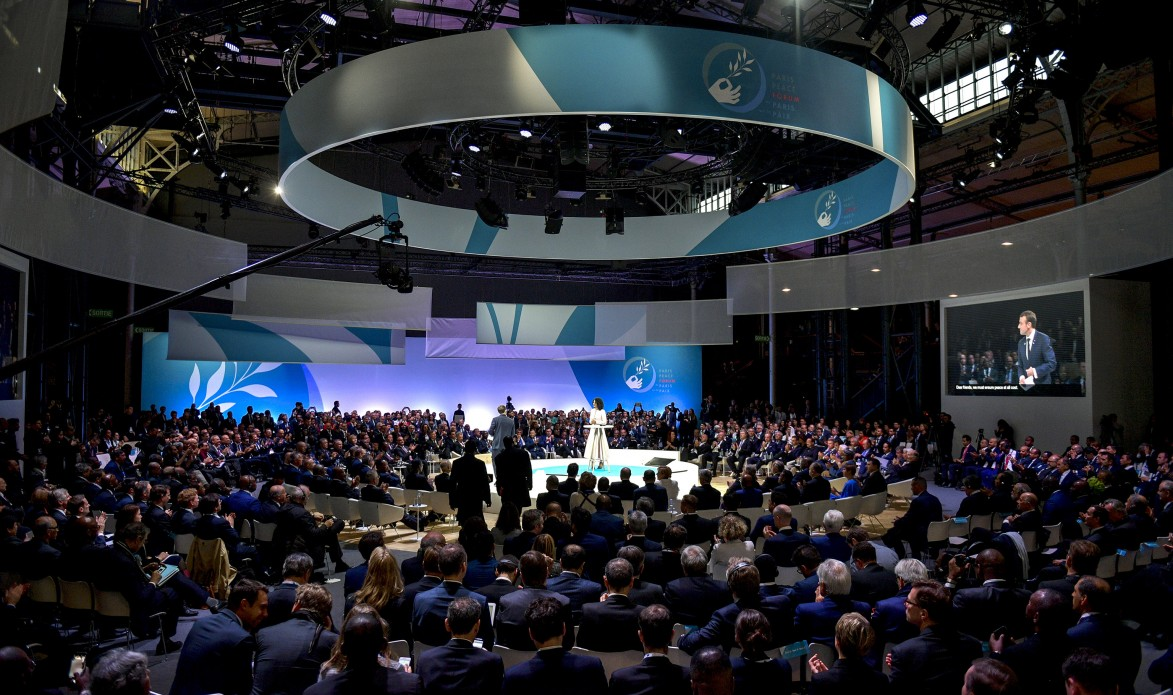
The first edition of the Paris Peace Forum in 2018

The first edition of the Paris Peace Forum took place from 11 to 13 November 2018 as part of the Armistice Day centenary commemorations. It showcased 120 global governance projects and welcomed around 6,000 individuals over the 3-day period. German Chancellor Angela Merkel, United Nations Secretary-General António Guterres and President Emmanuel Macron gave speeches at the opening of the forum. UN Secretary-General Guterres drew parallels between the political atmosphere then and the pre-World War I period and the ‘30s Interwar period. Merkel made similar remarks, noting that nationalism and populism were threatening European peace.

==== Agenda ====
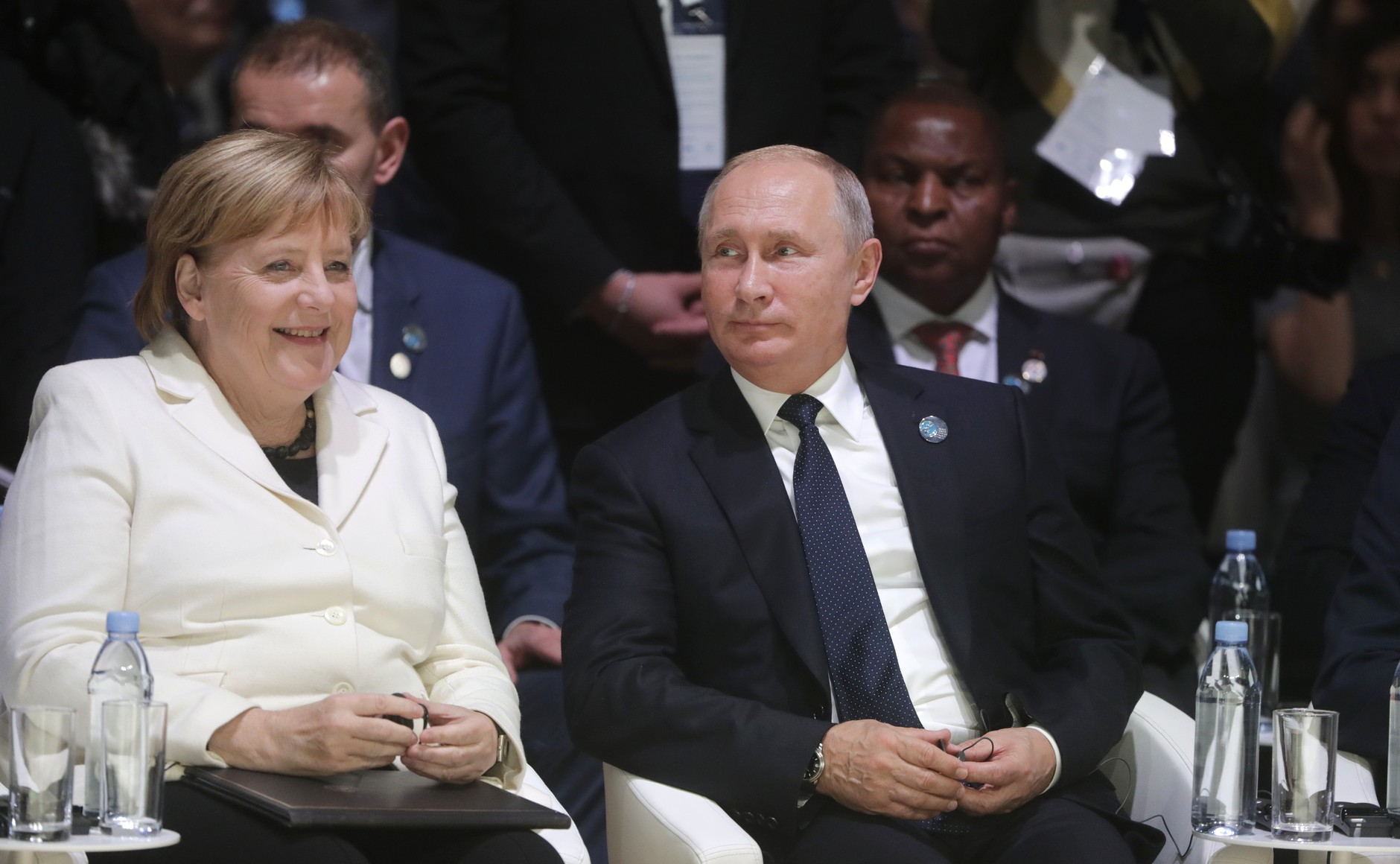
Angela Merkel and Vladimir Putin at the 2018 Paris Peace Forum

The commemoration of the 1918 Armistice was a recurring theme throughout the forum. President Macron aimed for the forum to bring about concrete proposals for multilateralism so that an outcome akin to WWI would not reoccur again. It was noted multiple times that the importance of remembering the Armistice stood in the comparisons that could be drawn between the 1930s and today. Similarly to statements made by UN Secretary General Guterres, Justin Vaïsse also highlighted the similarities, including: an economic crisis, closing of borders, commercial wars, migration and refugees, and a resurgence of populist and nationalist movements.

==== Themes and format ====
The three day event presented a variety of formats, including debates, panels, round tables, masterclasses, workshops, project pitches, as well as a hackathon during which developers worked on financial data transparency programs. Braindates by e180 was also present at the forum to provide peer-to-peer learning sessions and small discussion groups for the attendees and the project leaders. At the center of the Grande Halle de la Villette was the Peace Library, a tree-shaped shelf structure on which heads of state and government each placed a book from their country that for them symbolized peace and international cooperation.

The overarching theme of the event was multilateralism: its importance as well as its shortcomings. The President of Niger, Mahamadou Issoufou, denounced the double standards of multilateralism, pointing out that African leaders do not have as strong a voice in the international scene despite multilateral decisions concerning Africa occupying a significant space in the agendas of international institutions. Among the other themes that were tackled were social inequality, with speakers such as Guy Rider, Lise Kingo and Jeffrey Sachs; the role of cities in the fight against climate change, with experts like Laurence Tubiana and Ariel Toh Shu Xian, who mentioned the critical role of science education, and Hindou Oumarou Ibrahim who spoke of its effects in the Sahel and more. The forum also hosted the Declaration on Information and Democracy by Reporters Without Borders, with the presence of the representatives of Burkina Faso, Canada, Costa Rica, Denmark, France, Latvia, Lebanon, Lithuania, Norway, Senegal, Switzerland and Tunisia.

==== The Paris Call for Trust and Security in Cyberspace ====
51 countries, 130 companies and 90 universities and non-governmental groups signed the "Paris Call for Trust and Security in Cyberspace", a non-binding declaration initiated by President Macron, calling for protection from cyberattacks. It aims to protect civilians, to keep external actors from interfering with elections, and to preserve intellectual property, and has been likened to a digital version of the Geneva Convention. Brad Smith, president of Microsoft noted for the New York Times, "Most of the world's democracies are rallying around the need to protect all democracies from cyberattacks." The United States was one of the few Western nations that refused to sign the declaration.

==== Selected projects ====
120 projects advancing concrete solutions were presented during the three-day event in one of the following categories: environment, peace and security, development, new technologies and inclusive economy. Out of them, ten were selected by the jury to receive support for a one-year period.

==== Attendees ====
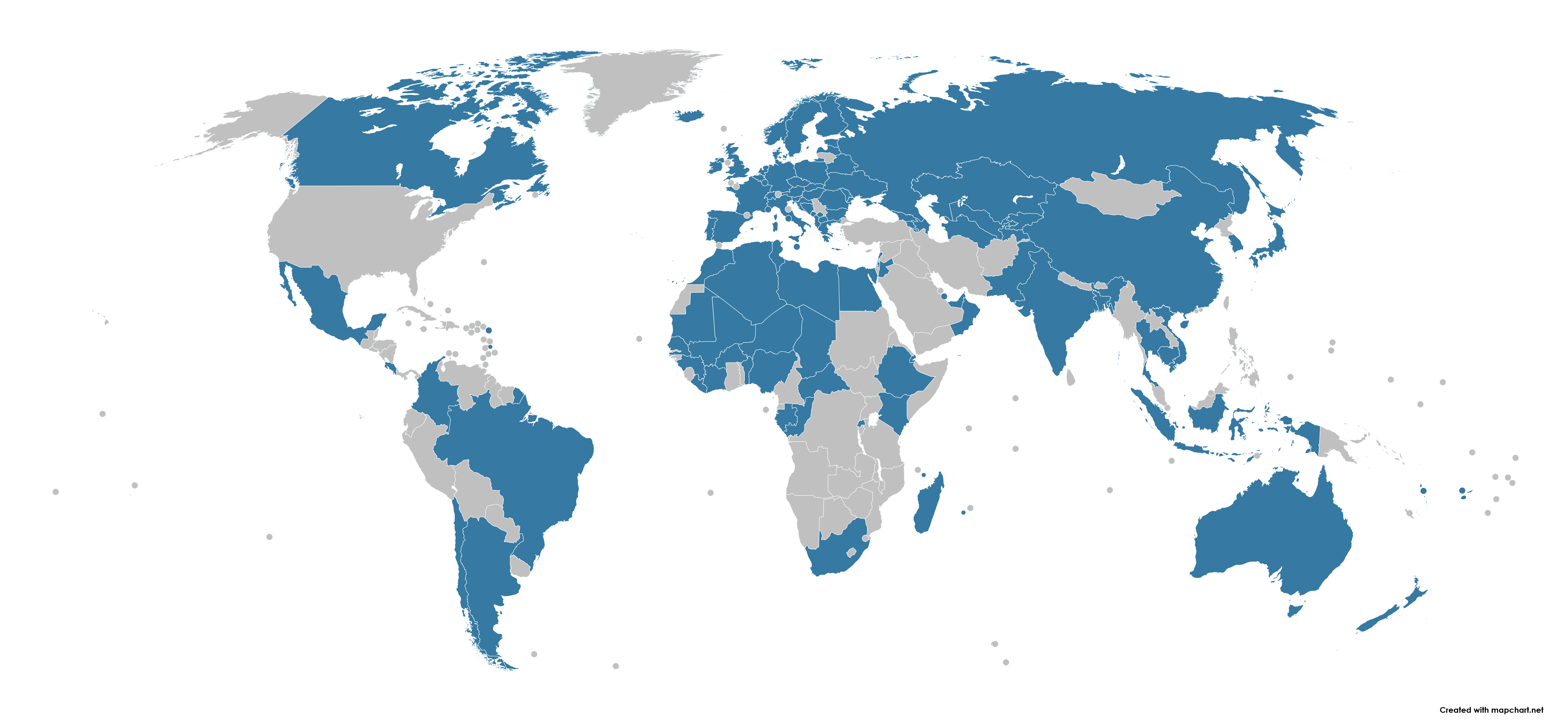
Countries from which at least one representative attended the 2018 edition

117 foreign guests attended the forum, including 54 heads of state and government, 16 diplomats accredited to France, and 15 representatives of international and supranational organisations. What was also noted was US President Donald Trump's absence at the forum, despite having attended a commemoration ceremony at the Arc de Triomphe on the morning of 11 November. Other attendants included French Minister of Foreign Affairs Jean-Yves Le Drian, Nobel Peace Prize laureates Nadia Murad and Shirin Ebadi, and Reporters Without Borders secretary-general Christophe Deloire.

Africa

- Ahmed Ouyahia, Prime Minister of Algeria
- Aurélien Agbénonci, Minister of Foreign Affairs of Benin
- Alpha Barry, Minister of Foreign Affairs of Burkina Faso
- Faustin-Archange Touadéra, President of the Central African Republic
- Idriss Déby, President of Chad
  - Amine Abba Sidick, Ambassador of Chad to France
- Denis Sassou-Nguesso, President of the Republic of the Congo
- (Ivory Coast) Alassane Ouattara, President of Côte d'Ivoire
- Ismaïl Omar Guelleh, President of Djibouti
- Sherif Ismail, advisor to the President of Egypt
- Mohamed Ali Suleiman, Ambassador of Ethiopia to France
- Régis Immongault Tatangani, Minister of Foreign Affairs of Gabon
- Alpha Condé, President of Guinea
  - Mamadi Touré, Minister of Foreign Affairs of Guinea
- Uhuru Kenyatta, President of Kenya
- George Weah, President of Liberia
- Fayez al-Sarraj, Chairman of the Presidential Council of Libya
- Eloi Alphonse Maxime Dovo, Minister of Foreign Affairs of Madagascar
- Ibrahim Boubacar Keita, President of Mali
- Mohamed Ould Abdel Aziz, President of Mauritania
- Nasser Bourita, Minister of Foreign Affairs of Morocco
- Mahamadou Issoufou, President of Niger
- Muhammadu Buhari, President of Nigeria
- Paul Kagame, President of Rwanda
- Macky Sall, President of Senegal
- Danny Faure, President of Seychelles
- Nosiviwe Mapisa-Nqakula, Minister of Defence of South Africa
- Beji Caid Essebsi, President of Tunisia

Americas

- Mario Raúl Verón Guerra, Ambassador of Argentina to France
- Paulo César de Oliveira Campos, Ambassador of Brazil to France
- Justin Trudeau, Prime Minister of Canada
- Camila Marquez, chargée d'affaires a.i. of Chile
- Iván Duque Márquez, President of Colombia
- Carlos Alvarado Quesada, President of Costa Rica
- Martha Delgado Peralta, Vice Minister of Foreign Affairs of Mexico

Asia

- Nikol Pashinyan, Prime Minister of Armenia
- Elmar Mammadyarov, Minister of Foreign Affairs of Azerbaijan
- Tarique Ahmed Siddique, security advisor to the Prime Minister of Bangladesh
- Chea Sophara, Deputy Prime Minister of Cambodia
- Ji Bingxuan, Vice Chairman of the Standing Committee of the National People's Congress of China
- (Georgia (country)) Giorgi Margvelashvili, President of Georgia
- Venkaiah Naidu, Vice President of India
- Hotmangaradja Pandjaitan, Ambassador of Indonesia to France
- Kazuhiko Nakamura, Minister-Councilor at the Embassy of Japan
- Bisher Al-Khasawneh, Ambassador of Jordan to France
- Jean Galiev, Ambassador of Kazakhstan to France
- Choi Jong-moon, Ambassador of South Korea to France
- Dastan Jumabekov, Speaker of the Parliament of Kyrgyzstan
- Saad Hariri, Prime Minister of Lebanon
- Mona al Baiti, Ambassador of Oman to France
- Moin ul Haq, Ambassador of Pakistan to France
- Rami Hamdallah, Prime Minister of Palestine
- Sheikh Tamim bin Hamad Al Thani, Emir of Qatar
- Shukurjon Zuhurov, Chairman of the Assembly of Representatives of Tajikistan
- Prayut Chan-o-cha, Prime Minister of Thailand
- Çary Nyýazow, Ambassador of Turkmenistan to France
- Sheikh Nahyan bin Mubarak Al Nahyan, Minister for Tolerance of the United Arab Emirates
- Nigmatilla Yuldashev, Chairman of the Senate of Uzbekistan
- Nguyen Thiêp, Ambassador of Vietnam to France

Europe

- Ilir Meta, President of Albania
- Alexander Van der Bellen, President of Austria
- Mikhail Myasnikovich, Speaker of the Council of the Republic of the National Assembly of Belarus
- Vincent Mertens de Wilmars, Ambassador of Belgium to France
- Bakir Izetbegović, Chairman of the Presidency of Bosnia and Herzegovina
- Rumen Radev, President of Bulgaria
- Kolinda Grabar-Kitarović, President of Croatia
- Andrej Babiš, Prime Minister of the Czech Republic
- Lars Løkke Rasmussen, Prime Minister of Denmark
- Kersti Kaljulaid, President of Estonia
- Sauli Niinistö, President of Finland
- Angela Merkel, Chancellor of Germany
- Alexis Tsipras, Prime Minister of Greece
- Pietro Parolin, Cardinal Secretary of State of the Holy See
- Márta Mátrai, First Officer of the National Assembly of Hungary
- Gudni Johannesson, President of Iceland
- (Republic of Ireland) Patricia O'Brien, Ambassador of Ireland to France
- Sergio Mattarella, President of Italy
- Hashim Thaçi, President of the Kosovo
- Raimonds Vējonis, President of Latvia
- Martine Schommer, Ambassador of Luxembourg to France
- (North Macedonia) Gjorge Ivanov, President of the Former Yugoslav Republic of Macedonia
- Carmelo Abela, Minister of Foreign Affairs of Malta
- Igor Dodon, President of Moldova
- Prince Albert II of Monaco
- Milo Đukanović, President of Montenegro
- Stef Blok, Minister of Foreign Affairs of the Netherlands
- Erna Solberg, Prime Minister of Norway
- Jacek Czaputowicz, Minister of Foreign Affairs of Poland
- Marcelo Rebelo de Sousa, President of Portugal
- Klaus Iohannis, President of Romania
- Vladimir Putin, President of Russia
- Andrej Kiska, President of Slovakia
- Borut Pahor, President of Slovenia
- Pedro Sánchez, Prime Minister of Spain
- Stefan Löfven, Prime Minister of Sweden
- (Switzerland) Alain Berset, President of the Swiss Confederation
- Petro Poroshenko, President of Ukraine
- David Lidington, Chancellor of the Duchy of Lancaster and Minister for the Cabinet Office of the United Kingdom
  - The Lord Bates, Minister of State for International Development

Oceania

- Sir Peter Cosgrove, Governor-General of Australia
- Epeli Nailatikau, former President of Fiji
- Winston Peters, Deputy Prime Minister and Minister of Foreign Affairs of New Zealand
- Tallis Obed Moses, President of Vanuatu

International organisations

- Moussa Faki, Chairperson of the African Union Commission
- Paul Kagame, Chairperson of the African Union
- Thorbjørn Jagland, Secretary General of the Council of Europe
- (European Union) Pierre Moscovici, European Commissioner for Economic and Financial Affairs, Taxation and Customs
- (European Union) Antonio Tajani, President of the European Parliament
- Guy Ryder, Director-General of the International Labour Organization
- Christine Lagarde, chair and managing director of the International Monetary Fund
- Jens Stoltenberg, Secretary-General of NATO
- José Ángel Gurría, Secretary-General of the Organisation of Economic Cooperation and Development
- Audrey Azoulay, Director-General of UNESCO
- (United Nations) Paolo Artini, Representative of the UNHRC in France
- António Guterres, Secretary-General of the United Nations
- María Fernanda Espinosa Garces, President of the United Nations General Assembly
- Roberto Azevêdo, Director-General of the World Trade Organization
- Jim Yong Kim, President of the World Bank

=== Second edition (2019) ===
The second edition of the Paris Peace Forum took place on 11–13 November at la Grande Halle de La Villette, under the presidency of Pascal Lamy, who was previously President of the Steering Committee, and with Justin Vaïsse as the forum's Director General. The Paris Peace Forum 2019 was attended by 7,000 participants, representing 164 nationalities. 33 heads of state and government were present, with official delegations from 140 countries. 318 project leaders representing 114 governance solutions from around the world gathered in the forum's Space for Solutions.

The United Nations Secretary-General, António Guterres, the Mayor of Paris, Anne Hidalgo, and the President of the Paris Peace Forum, Pascal Lamy, spoke during the event's soft opening on 11 November. Guterres referred to the main global challenges of our times, by distinguishing five global risks: an economic and geostrategic polarization, a crack of the social contract caused by rising inequalities and protests, the loss of solidarity between communities and the rise of hate as a political tool, environmental degradation and the climate crisis, and finally, the risk of unchecked technology. The official opening ceremony took place on 12 November. Opening remarks were made by the French President Emmanuel Macron, the President-elect of the European Commission, Ursula von der Leyen, President of the Democratic Republic of the Congo, Félix Tshisekedi, and the vice-president of the People's Republic of China, Wang Qishan.

==== Format and themes ====
The second edition of the Paris Peace Forum saw a number of new activities and formats, such as the Peace Game, organized by Foreign Policy and Körber Stiftung. A Peace Game brings together participants with the purpose of working out a crisis scenario through concrete solutions. Among the other formats participants were invited to attend, the '20 Questions to the World', and Braindates by e180, were particularly successful. For this second edition, last year's Peace Library, which gathered books gifted by high-level participants, took the form of a Peace Globe, where world leaders were given the opportunity to leave objects symbolizing peace.

==== Key initiatives ====
Nine initiatives were launched and developed at the second edition of the Paris Peace Forum. These included B4IG, which started out at the G7 Leaders' Summit in Biarritz, and which is driven by Emmanuel Macron, the OECD and Danone in order to unite companies for inclusive growth. The "Alliance for Multilateralism", launched in April 2019 by the French and German foreign ministers, held a session on the governance of the digital sphere, which was moderated by the French Minister of Europe & Foreign Affairs, Jean-Yves Le Drian. Other initiatives included the inauguration of the Reporters Without Borders Forum on Information and Democracy, and the launch of the Indian Coalition for Disaster Resilient Infrastructure, driven by Indian Prime Minister Narendra Modi.

=== Third edition (2020) ===
The third edition, hosted virtually from 11 to 13 November 2020, was chiefly devoted to the multi-actor response to the COVID-19 pandemic, with the conviction that all relevant actors can collectively overcome the enormous challenges faced by the international community and use the crisis as an opportunity to rebuild a more sustainable world. Macron hosted Senegalese President Macky Sall, IMF Managing Director Kristalina Georgieva, and European Council President Charles Michel at the Élysée Palace, while over 50 world leaders and heads of international organizations contributed video messages during the event, including New Zealand Prime Minister Jacinda Ardern, Italian Prime Minister Giuseppe Conte and Chinese President Xi Jinping.

In 2020 on a specially developed digital event platform, the virtual edition of the Paris Peace Forum counted 12,000 online participants representing 151 countries, over 50 heads of state and government, 117 hours of live broadcasting, 178 debate sessions and project pitches, and 100 concrete projects from around the globe.

==== Key achievements ====
The third edition included three major achievements:

1. The Finance in Common Summit, gathering 450 public development banks, whose funds represent over 10% of global investment. This first-of-its-kind summit led to a signed declaration to align their investments with the SDGs and climate objectives.
2. A coalition of states, international organizations and foundations (Bill & Melinda Gates Foundation, France, Spain, the EU commission, and other actors) announced a contribution of $500M for ACT-A, the accelerator for Covid-19 vaccines, tests and therapies.
3. Leaders of the UN, IMF, Germany, France, Senegal and the European Union started a global conversation on the principles which shall guide the world recovery after the Covid-19 crisis. This political discussion has set up the stage for a new international consensus towards a fairer and more resilient paradigm to define the principles of the post-Covid19 world: the "Paris Consensus".

=== Fourth edition (2021) ===
The fourth edition of the Paris Peace Forum was dedicated to bridging global governance gaps. The second consecutive edition devoted to the COVID-19 pandemic, it was hosted in a hybrid format from 11 to 13 November 2021, promoting global coordination in times of COVID-19. The official ceremony on 11 November convened heads of state and government as well as NGO leaders and CEOs of global companies, headed by French President Emmanuel Macron, and including Nigerian President Muhammadu Buhari, and Bangladeshi Prime Minister Sheikh Hasina. The United States was also represented at the forum for the first time, via Vice President Kamala Harris.

In 2021, the fourth edition counted 15,000 online participants and a thousand present in Paris, whereas 45 heads of state and government and leaders of international organizations were among experts taking part in 74 debate sessions, and the Space for Solutions counted 80 projects from around the world.

==== Key achievements ====
On the occasion of the 2021 forum, actors from all over the world concerned by the long-term sustainability of outer space launched the "Net Zero Space" initiative. This new initiative calls for achieving sustainable use of outer space for the benefit of all humankind by 2030 by taking concrete actions to tackle the pressing challenge of reducing debris orbiting Earth.

The Paris Call for Trust and Security in Cyberspace, launched on 12 November 2018 at the Paris Peace Forum, is a call to come together to face the new threats endangering citizens and infrastructure. It is based on nine common principles to secure cyberspace, which provide areas for discussion and action. The Paris Call invites all cyberspace actors to work together and encourage states to cooperate with private sector partners, academia, and civil society. The 1,200 supporters of the Paris Call (80 states, more than 700 companies, 350 civil society organizations) commit to working together to adopt responsible behavior and implement within cyberspace the fundamental principles which apply in the physical world. As part of their participation in the 2021 edition, Vice President Kamala Harris and President Ursula von der Leyen announced the United States and the European Union's decision to support the Paris Call.

The forum hosted the launch of an international call to stand up for children's rights in the digital environment. French President Emmanuel Macron and UNICEF, along with seven other states, a dozen non-governmental organizations, and most of the major digital platforms (including Amazon, Google, YouTube, Meta, Microsoft, Dailymotion, Qwant, Snap, and Twitter) signed this call and committed to enabling children to use digital tools safely and benefit from their full potential without being exposed to abuse through a series of actions.

The International Fund for Public Interest Media was launched as an initiative to create the step change needed to enable the development, sustainability, and independence of public interest media, especially in resource-poor and fragile settings. The fund is co-chaired by Maria Ressa, 2021 Nobel Peace Prize laureate, and former New York Times President and CEO Mark Thompson.

The forum brought together 22 defense ministers to discuss the "Climate Change and the Armed Forces" initiative. This roadmap, the foundation for a growing coalition, aims to reduce emissions from armed forces, mitigate damage, and strengthen cooperation between states in the process of adapting armed forces to the impact of climate change.

=== Fifth edition (2022) ===
The fifth edition of the Paris Peace Forum was held through 11–12 November 2022, with its agenda mainly overshadowed by the Russian invasion of Ukraine. Attendants included President of Argentina Alberto Fernández, President of Colombia Gustavo Petro, OECD Secretary-General Mathias Cormann and President of the International Committee of the Red Cross Mirjana Spoljaric Egger.

=== Sixth edition (2023) ===
The sixth edition of the Paris Peace Forum was held 10–11 November 2023 at the Palais Brongniart. The aim of the 2023 Forum was to "Seek Common Ground in a World of Rivalry". Solving the Gaza humanitarian crisis was a late addition to the agenda.

=== Seventh edition (2024) ===
The seventh edition of the Paris Peace Forum was held 11-12 November 2024 at the Palais de Chaillot with the theme "Wanted: a Functioning World Order". It included sessions with Jean-Noël Barrot, Oleksandra Matviichuk, Ehud Olmert, Nasser al-Qudwa and Nataša Pirc Musar.

=== Eighth edition (2025) ===
The eighth edition of the Paris Peace Forum was held 29-30 October 2025 at the Palais de Chaillot with the theme “New Coalitions for Peace, People, and the Planet”. It included sessions with Emmanuel Macron, Ghanaian President John Mahama, Moldovan President Maia Sandu, Montenegrin President Jakov Milatović, North Macedonian President Gordana Siljanovska-Davkova, Barbadian Prime Minister Mia Mottley, Albanian Prime Minister Edi Rama, Armenian Prime Minister Nikol Pashinyan, Kosovan Prime Minister Albin Kurti, former Chilean President Michelle Bachelet, former New Zealand Prime Minister Jacinda Ardern, former Israeli Prime Minister Ehud Olmert, former African Union Commission President and former Prime Minister of Chad Moussa Faki, former Serbian Prime Minister and President of the Serbian National Assembly Ana Brnabić, former Greek Prime Minister Giórgos Papandréou, former French Prime Minister and COP21 President Laurent Fabius, Nobel Peace Prize laureate Maria Ressa, Belarusian opposition leader Sviatlana Tsikhanouskaya and Paris Mayor Anne Hidalgo.

== Criticism ==
The Paris Peace Forum faced criticism in 2018 for having extended an invitation to Saudi Arabia, in light of the murder of journalist Jamal Khashoggi and the continuing war in Yemen. Due to similar contradictions, such as France's involvement in weapons sales, and nuclear armament, questions were raised as to the extent to which the peace summit was truly substantial or just an instrument of communication.

Criticism was also drawn to the event's funding, with contributions made, among others, by tech giants such as Google and Microsoft.

Some also argued that the forum was homogeneous in its discussion, reserved for the elites who agreed with each other rather than including those who disagreed with multilateralism.
